= San Francisco State University =

Public university in San Francisco, California

Coordinates: 37°43′24″N 122°28′47″W

- Former names: San Francisco State Normal School (1899–1921); San Francisco State Teachers College (1921–1935); San Francisco State College (1935–1972); California State University, San Francisco (1972–1974)
- Motto: Experientia Docet (Latin)
- Motto in English: "Experience Teaches"
- Type: Public research university
- Established: 1899; 127 years ago
- Parent institution: California State University
- Accreditation: WSCUC
- Academic affiliations: USU
- Endowment: $181,451,758 (FY 2024-25)
- Budget: $553 million (FY2025-26, budgeted expenses)
- President: Lynn Mahoney
- Provost: Amy Sueyoshi
- Faculty: 1,582 (2024)
- Administrative staff: 1,417 (2024)
- Students: 19,344 (Spring 2026)
- Undergraduates: 16,392 (Spring 2026)
- Postgraduates: 2,656 (Spring 2026)
- Other students: 296 (Spring 2026)
- Location: San Francisco, California, United States
- Campus: 141.1 acres (57.1 ha); Large city
- Other campuses: Romberg Tiburon Campus; Downtown Campus; Sierra Nevada Field Campus
- Newspaper: Golden Gate Xpress
- Colors: Purple and gold
- Nickname: Gators
- Sporting affiliations: NCAA Division II – CCAA
- Mascot: Gator
- Website: sfsu.edu

California Historical Landmark
- Official name: San Francisco State Teacher's College
- Designated: 1/7/2008
- Reference no.: N2378

San Francisco State University (San Francisco State, SF State and SFSU) is a public research university in San Francisco, California, United States. It was established in 1899 as the San Francisco State Normal School and is part of the California State University system.

The university offers 124 bachelor's degree programs, 95 master's degree programs, 56 blended bachelor's and master's degree programs, and 3 doctoral degree programs, along with 23 teaching credential programs among seven colleges. The 144.1-acre main campus is located in the southwest part of the city, less than two miles from the Pacific coast. The university has 12 varsity athletic teams which compete at the NCAA Division II level.

SF State is classified among "R2: Doctoral Universities – High research activity." It is also a designated Hispanic-Serving Institution (HSI) and Asian American Native American Pacific Islander Serving Institution (AANAPISI).

== History ==
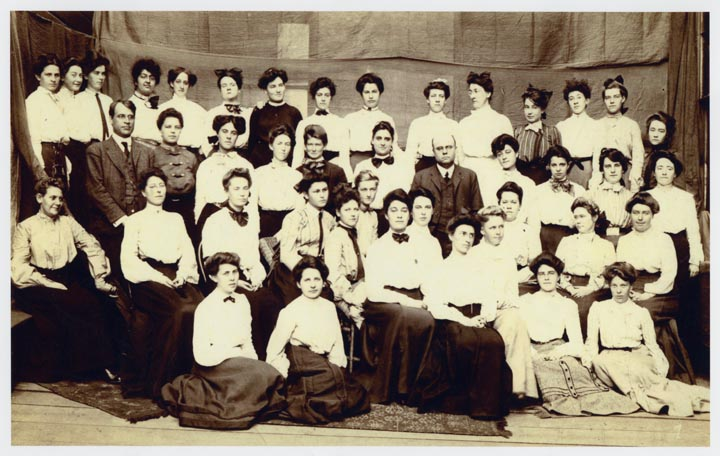
Graduating class, State Normal School at San Francisco, June 1906

=== 19th Century ===
In 1857, the San Francisco Board of Education created the San Francisco Weekly Normal School, also known as the Minns' Evening Normal School. In 1862, it became the California State Normal School, the first postsecondary institution established by the state. Only six students were enrolled on its first day. By 1866, enrollment increased to 384.

In 1867, the principal of Girls' High School and Normal School, Ellis Holmes, realized that the California State Normal School was not meeting the demand for teachers. The city approved the addition of a new year-long teacher-training program to his high school's curriculum, for girls who wanted to pursue a career in education. This program is what would eventually become San Francisco State University. When the California State Normal School was moved to San José in 1871, Girls' High became the only publicly supported teacher-training institution.

In 1895, the teaching program was split from the school and became San Francisco City Normal School. Due to a lack of funding, the school closed in 1898. A group of teachers, students, and supporters pressured the California State Legislature to convert it into a state-funded institution.

On March 22, 1899, the California State Legislature approved the creation of the San Francisco State Normal School, with an appropriation of $10,000. Frederic Lister Burk was appointed as the first president and chose the school's motto, Experientia Docet. The school rented space in a building on Powell Street between Clay and Sacramento Streets and 31 women were enrolled in the first year.

=== 20th Century ===
The 1906 earthquake and fire forced the school to relocate from Nob Hill to a temporary campus at the Grant School in Oakland. Ten days after the earthquake, President Burk found a new site for the school at a property bound by Laguna, Haight, Buchanan, and Hermann Streets.

In 1921, the school began offering bachelor's degree options and was renamed San Francisco State Teachers College. Teachers Colleges in California received authorization to grant Bachelor of Arts degrees in 1923.

In 1924, construction for new buildings started on vacant land at the school's site. The campus consisted of four Spanish Colonial Revival style buildings designed by George McDougall, a California state architect.

In the 1930s, the campus was overcrowded, needing to accommodate twice as many students as its capacity. It had been designed for 1500 students, but had to accommodate about 3000. In 1938, students rallied for a new campus with non-wooden buildings, due to fears from the city's earthquake and fire in 1906. By 1939, land near Lake Merced had been acquired to build a new campus, but plans were paused due to World War II. Many students took part in the war, causing enrollment to decline.

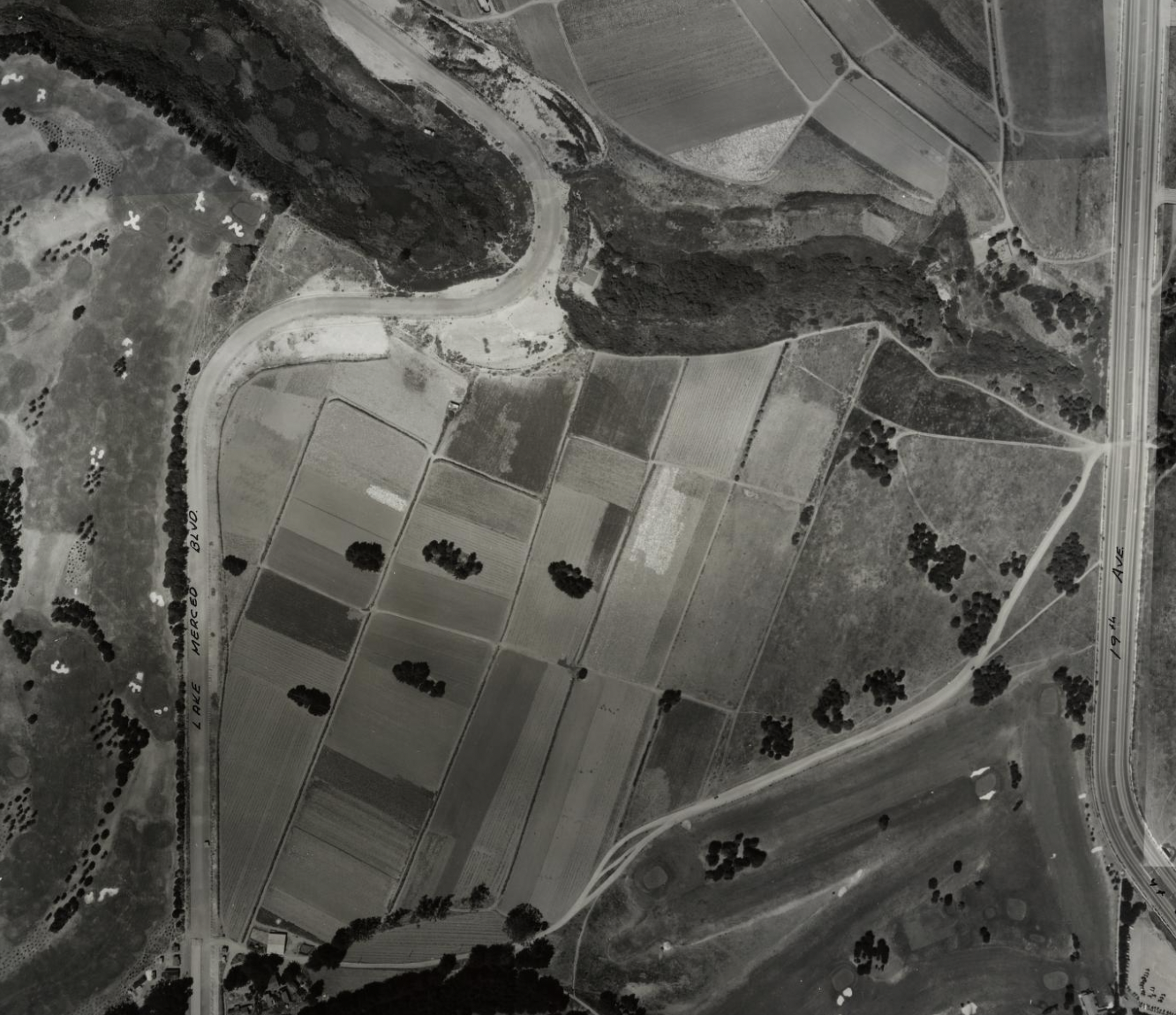
Site of San Francisco State University's current main campus, seen in 1938 part of Composite: 1-164 San Francisco Aerial Views by Harrison Ryker.

During the 1920s and '30s, State Teachers Colleges expanded beyond being only vocational schools to train teachers. They were formally authorized to offer four-year liberal arts curriculums and renamed State Colleges in 1935. So, the school became known as San Francisco State College.

In 1949, master's degrees were authorized to be offered.

San Francisco State College became part of the California State College system established under the Donahoe Higher Education Act in 1960. In Fall 1965, the Experimental College was started by students, in an effort to teach untraditionally. In 1927, over 2000 students enrolled in courses offered by the Experimental College. The original Experimental College stopped operating after 1969.

In 1967, 1968, and 1969, there were many demonstrations, including the Third World Liberation Front strike at SF State, longest student strike in American history, which lasted from November 6, 1968, to March 20, 1969.

Also in 1969, Richard Oakes led a group of SF State students in the occupation of Alcatraz Island And a 763-bed, 15-story dorm building, Verducci Hall, was built near Lake Merced Boulevard.

In 1971, campus-based childcare at SF State was approved by the California State Colleges board of trustees. On October 10, 1972, the Associated Students Lilliput Childcare Center opened, providing childcare to students who are parents and the general public. It's now called the AS Early Childhood Education Center.

In 1972, the state government enacted a bill which renamed the California State Colleges to "The California State University and Colleges". As a result, SF State was renamed California State University, San Francisco. The awkward new name was very unpopular with students. When said out loud, CSUSF often drew the humorous response "Gesundheit," and was frequently confused with CCSF, USF, and UCSF. The university was soon renamed San Francisco State University in 1974.

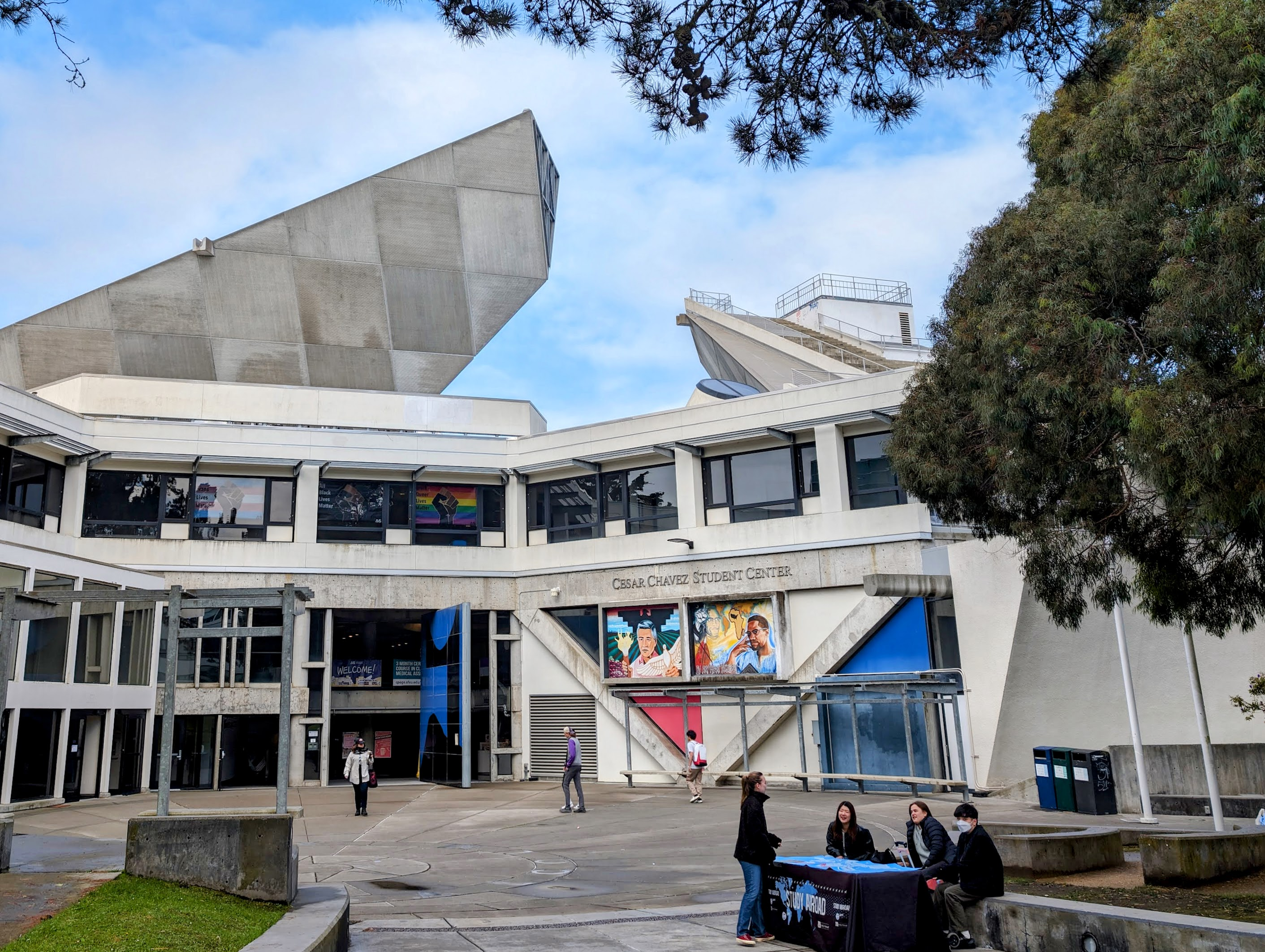
Student Center

President Romberg secured a permanent federal lease for 25 acres of shoreline in Tiburon for just $1 in 1978. The Romberg Tiburon Campus would eventually expand to 53 acres.

In 1983, Chia-Wei Woo became the 11th president of the university. Woo was the first Chinese-American to head a major American university.

After suffering damage from the 1989 Loma Prieta earthquake, Verducci Hall was permanently closed.

In 1993, the College of Extended Learning (now College of Global and Professional Education) opened the Downtown Center in San Francisco's Multimedia Gulch, at 425 Market St.

On March 28, 1999, construction began on the Village at Centennial Square, a low-rise, mixed-use complex. The same day, Verducci Hall was imploded after it sustained damage from the 1989 Loma Prieta earthquake and sat vacant for a decade.

=== 21st century ===
In 2007, the Downtown Campus was opened at 835 Market Street, with nearly 47,000 square feet of classroom space in Westfield San Francisco Centre.

In 2009, the Children's Campus opened to provide childcare, primarily to faculty and staff.

The first Rhythms Music Festival happened in March 2011. The annual music festival is held in a building known as the Annex.

In 2013, the Science Building was found to have "unsafe levels" of airborne mercury, lead and asbestos in the basement. Over $3.6 million was spent for remediation of the pervasive contamination. University administration terminated several employees who reported the contamination, resulting in several wrongful termination and whistle-blower lawsuits, including one by the recently hired director. In July 2014, Cal/OSHA cited the university for various health and safety violations in the Science Building, which included SFSU failing to locate asbestos in the building and warn employees about the hazards of mercury.

In March 2016, a video of a student being attacked for having dreadlocks went viral and sparked discussions about cultural appropriation.

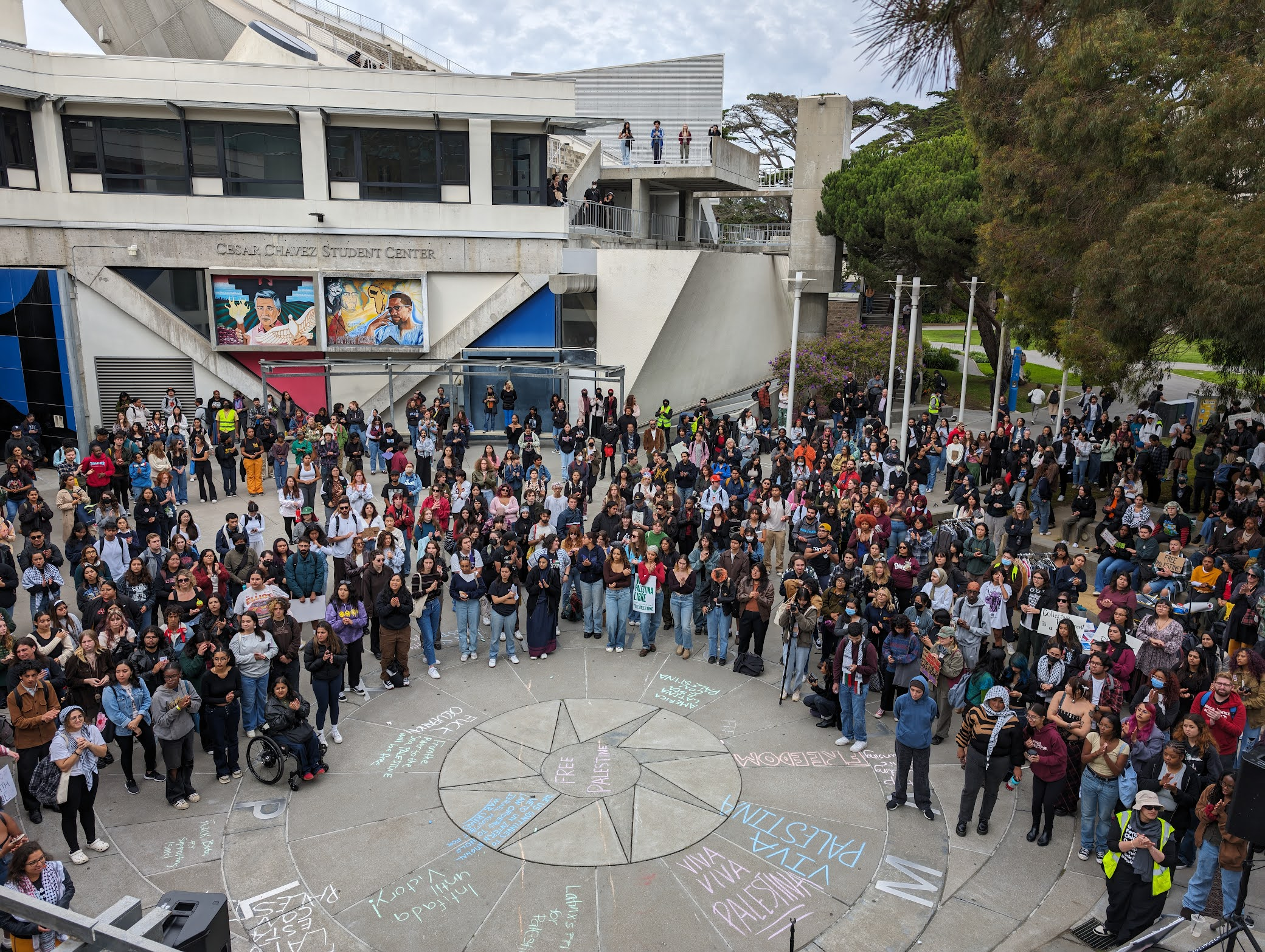
Hundreds of students walked out and rallied at SF State's Malcolm X Plaza on October 25, 2023.

In response to the college of Ethnic Studies being underfunded since 2008, four students held a ten-day hunger strike in May 2016, resulting in one hospitalization. The strike ended when President Leslie Wong agreed to commit nearly $500,000 to the college and meet a portion of their demands.

The Experimental College was revived in Fall 2017. One-unit courses are created and taught by students.

Also in 2017, a group of Jewish students and local residents accused SFSU of encouraging antisemitism and excluding Jewish student pro-Israel activist groups from campus activities. The students filed two lawsuits focusing on the disruption of a speech by Jerusalem mayor Nir Barkat in 2016. One suit was dismissed and the other was settled.

In May 2019, Lynn Mahoney became the first woman to become president of SF State in a permanent capacity. Mary Ward had served as an acting president in the summer of 1927, after the death of Archibald Anderson.

In September 2020, SFSU faculty Rabab Abdulhadi and Tomomi Kinukawa hosted a discussion on Zoom titled "Whose Narratives? Gender, Justice, and Resistance." The event's speakers included Leila Khaled, a Palestinian political activist and plane hijacker. Zoom and YouTube canceled the broadcast due to Khaled's history of violent actions towards civilians. Facebook also removed a page for the event. President Mahoney wrote a letter about the incident. A second event titled "Whose Narratives? What Free Speech for Palestine?" was scheduled for 2021, and was also blocked.

In 2022, the new Downtown Campus opened on the fifth floor of 160 Spear St., replacing the Downtown Campus at 835 Market Street.

In April 2023, former NCAA swimmer Riley Gaines visited SFSU for a Turning Point USA student chapter event and spoke publicly about her campaign against transgender athletes in women's sports. This sparked a protest. After the event, Gaines said she had been struck during the protest.

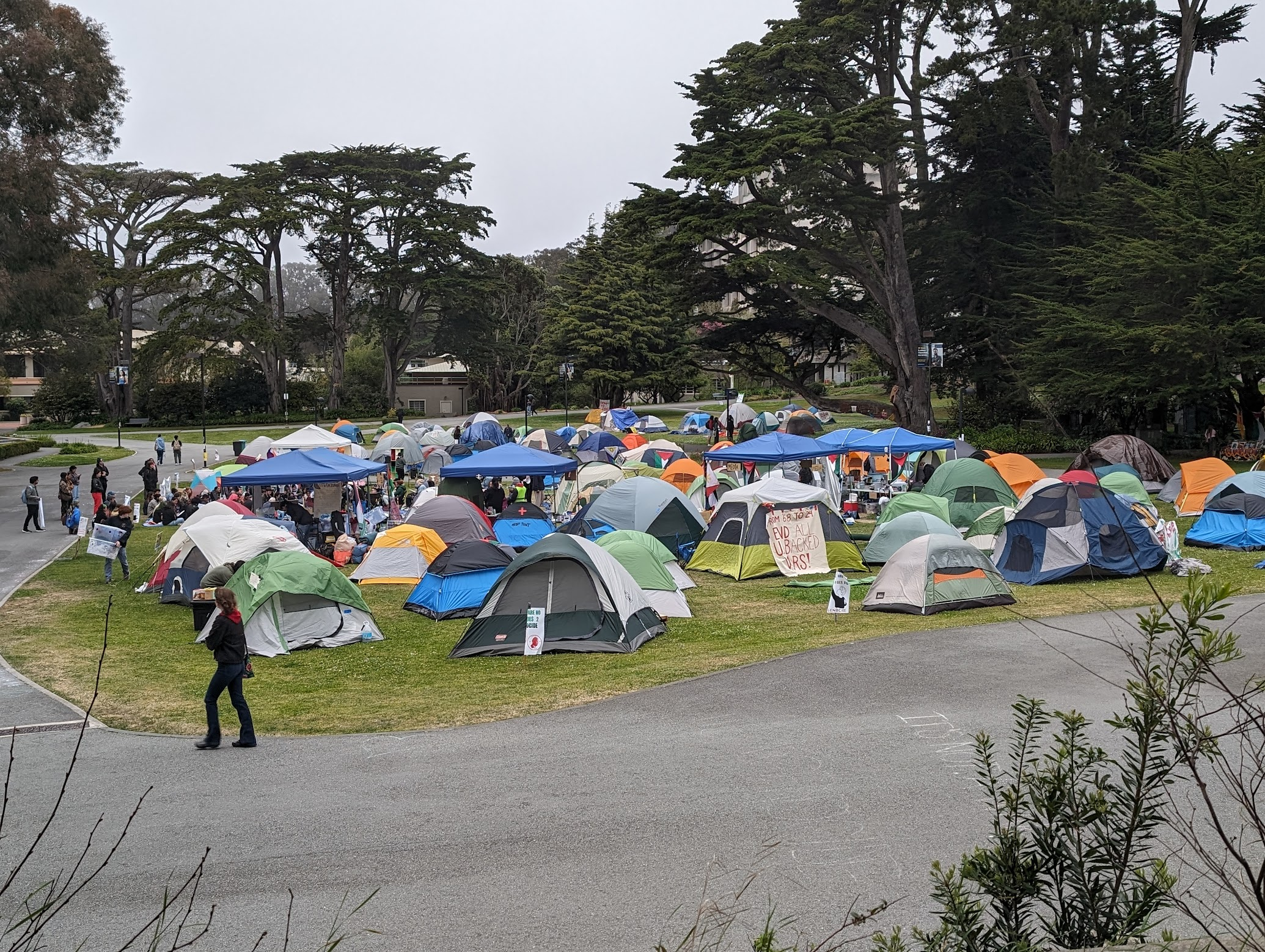
The encampment at SF State on May 3, 2024. It started on April 29 and lasted to May 15.

In September, October, and November, students and staff held numerous demonstrations in response to the Gaza war, tuition increases, layoffs, and budget cuts.

SFSU faculty members participated in a strike led by the California Faculty Association across the CSU system in January 2024. Faculty had held earlier demonstrations in an effort to prevent layoffs and receive a 12% raise.

About 500 people attended a rally in April 2024, calling for a ceasefire in the Gaza war. After the rally, some protestors began an encampment, following protests and encampments at universities in other parts of the United States and in other countries. The encampment ended in May after protestors reached a divestment agreement with university leaders.

In 2025, a closure of the Romberg Tiburon Campus was announced, but it was later paused after a fundraising campaign raised millions. It was announced in August 2026 that the campus would close by the end of September.

=== Milestones ===
- 1901 – First graduating class consisting of 36 women.
- 1923 – First Bachelor of Arts degree awarded
- 1929 – Grace Hackett became the first known African-American to graduate from the school
- 1930 – Became four-year school
- 1949 – Master's degree first offered
- 1972 – Received university status
- 1974 – Renamed San Francisco State University
- 1975 – Student Center opened its doors to students
- 1983 – Chia-Wei Woo became the first Chinese-American to head a major American university
- 1999 – Celebrated 100th anniversary
- 2019 – Lynn Mahoney became the university's first female president in a permanent capacity

== Main campus ==
San Francisco State University's main campus is located in the southwestern part of San Francisco. To its north are Lowell High School and Stonestown Galleria. Parkmerced is south of the campus. 19th Avenue and the Ingleside neighborhood are to its east and Lake Merced and TPC Harding Park are to its west.

Unlike other university campuses, there is no unifying architectural element. All buildings are modern, with some specifically brutalist.

San Francisco State University's original campus was on Nob Hill, where it was established as the San Francisco State Normal School on Powell Street between Clay and Sacramento Streets. The 1906 earthquake and fire forced a relocation to Buchanan and Haight Streets, where the institution would remain for several decades.

The shift to the current Lake Merced campus began during the Great Depression, when the site was still owned by Spring Valley Water Company. In 1939, SFSU President Alexander Roberts and student body president Clifford Worth explored the undeveloped property, which at the time consisted mainly of sand dunes dotted with trees and underbrush. Worth proved instrumental in securing the campus's future, successfully lobbying the state Legislature to fund the land purchase. His efforts culminated on July 12, 1939, when the state committed to purchasing 57 acres from the City of San Francisco. The campus opened for classes for Fall 1953, before it was formally dedicated in October 1954. Since then, it has expanded to 144.1 acres.

The campus is under the jurisdiction of San Francisco State's University Police Department.

=== Gallery ===
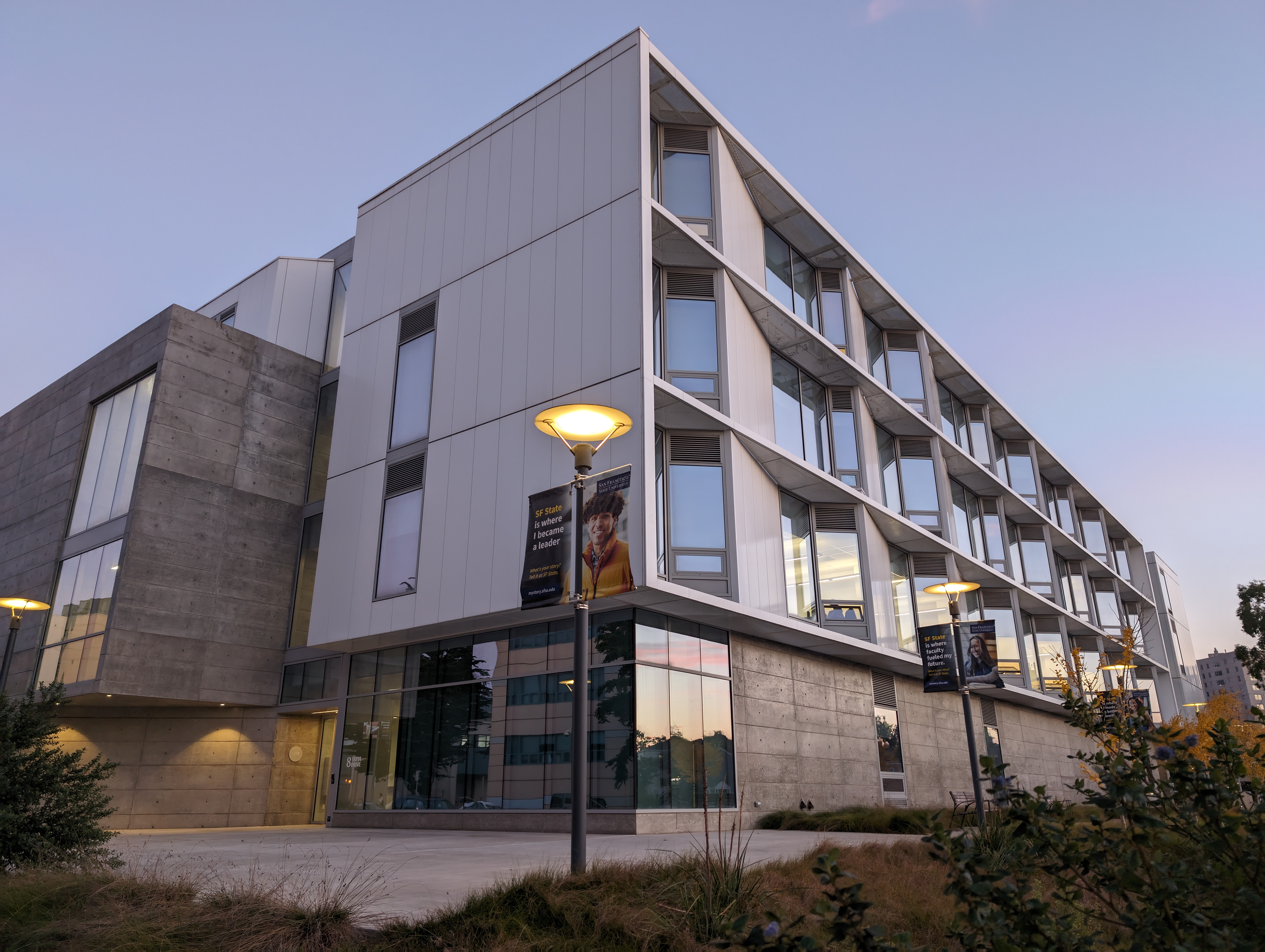
Marcus Hall

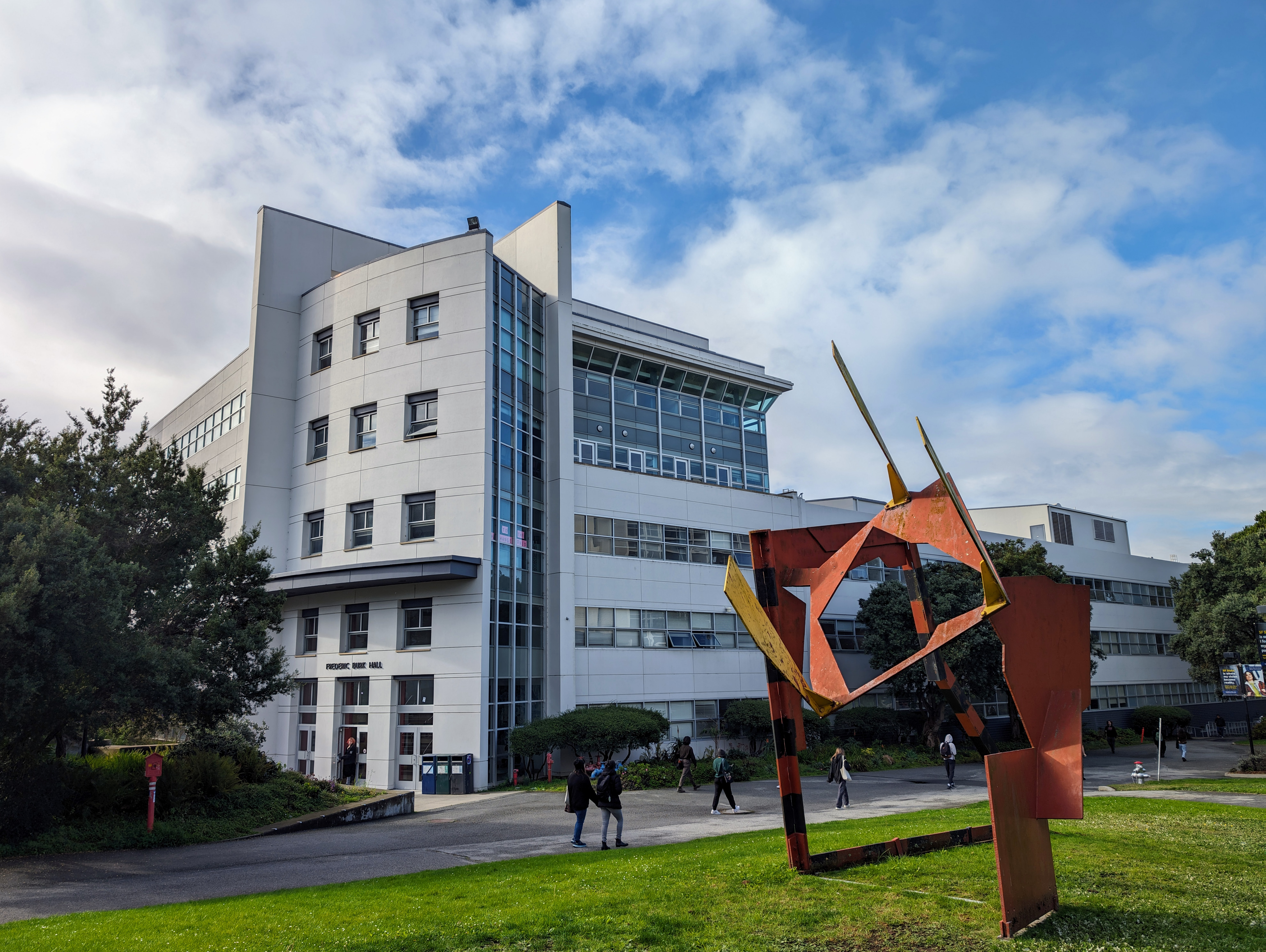
Burk Hall

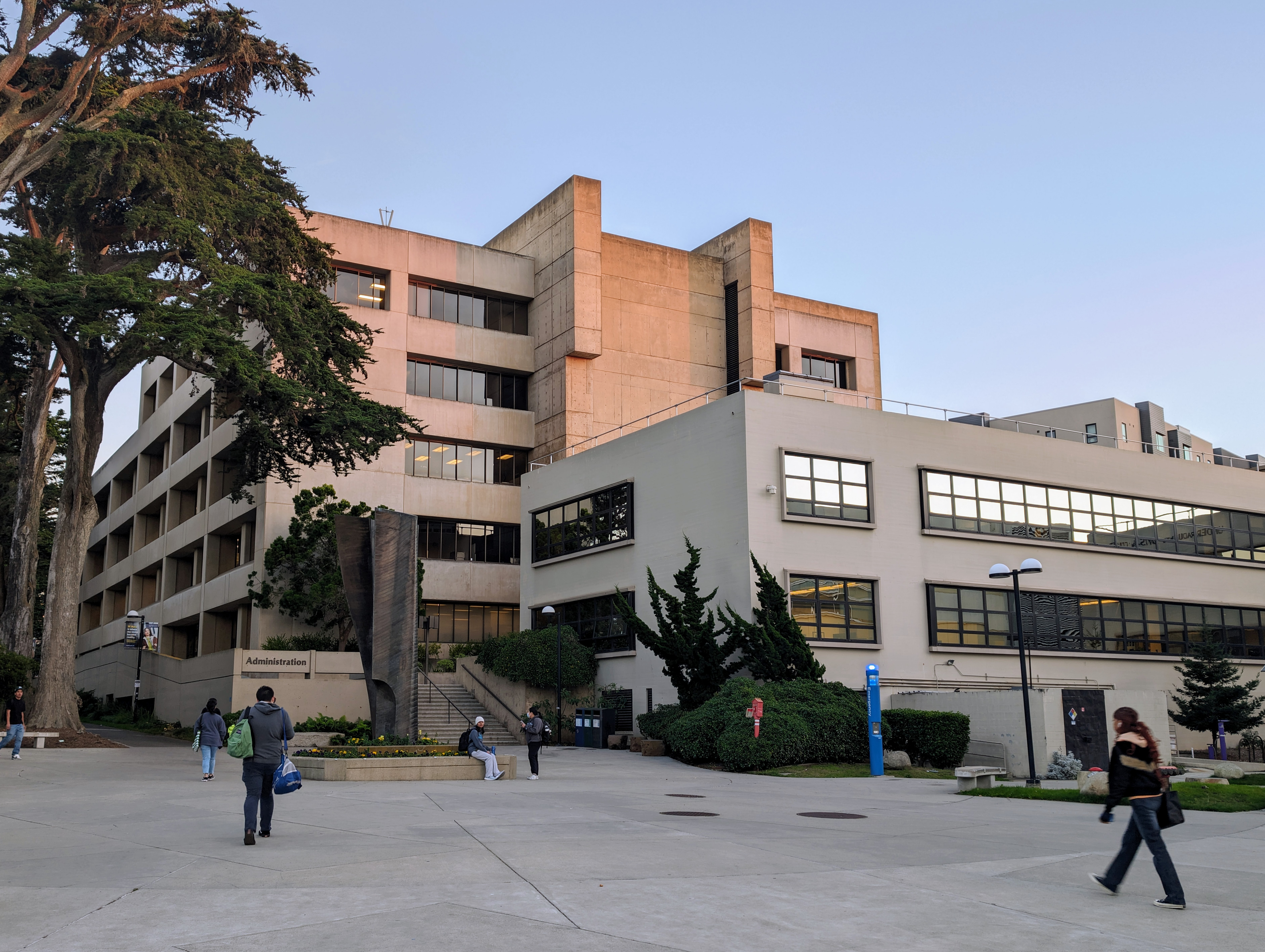
Administration Building

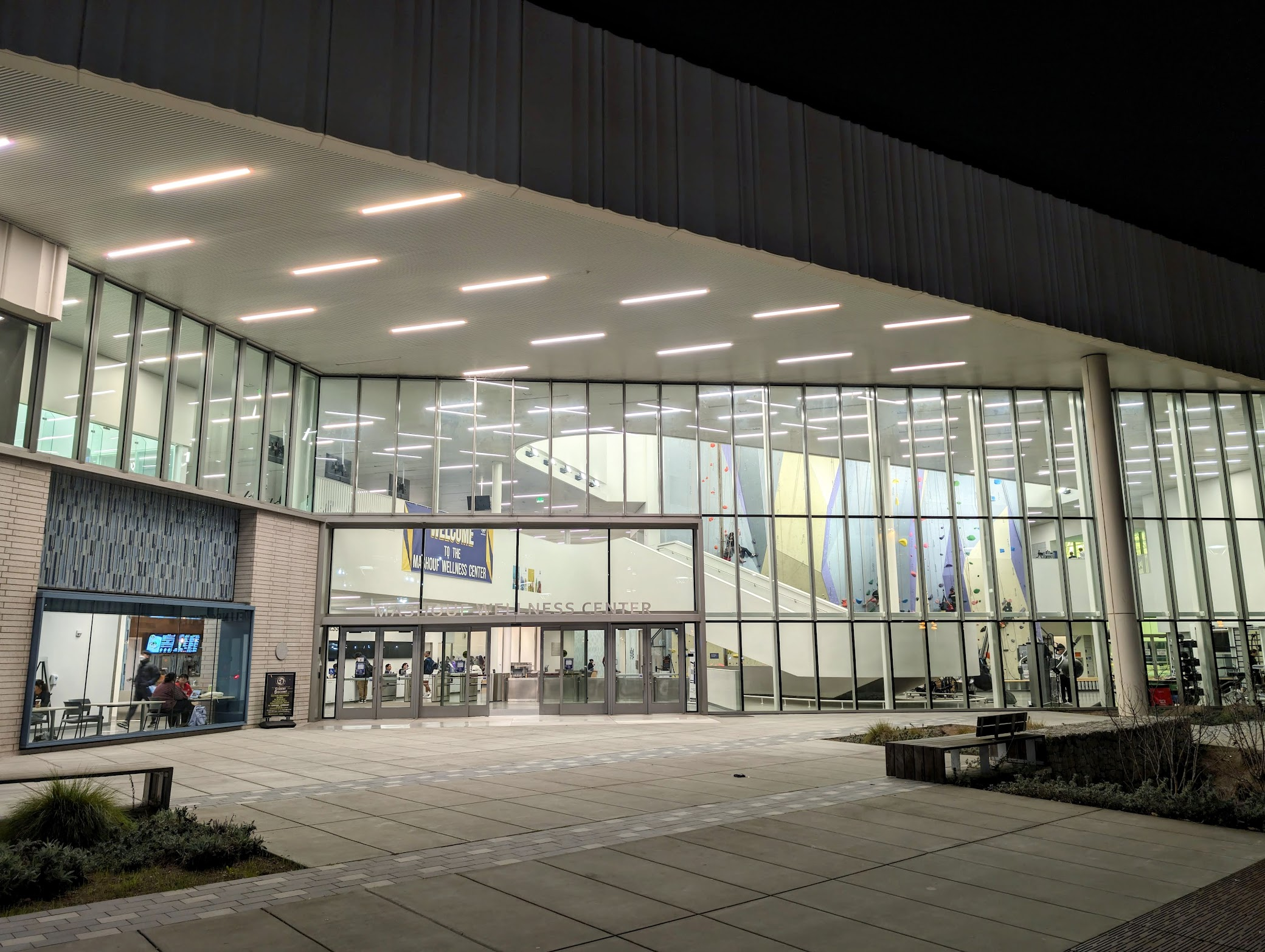
Mashouf Wellness Center

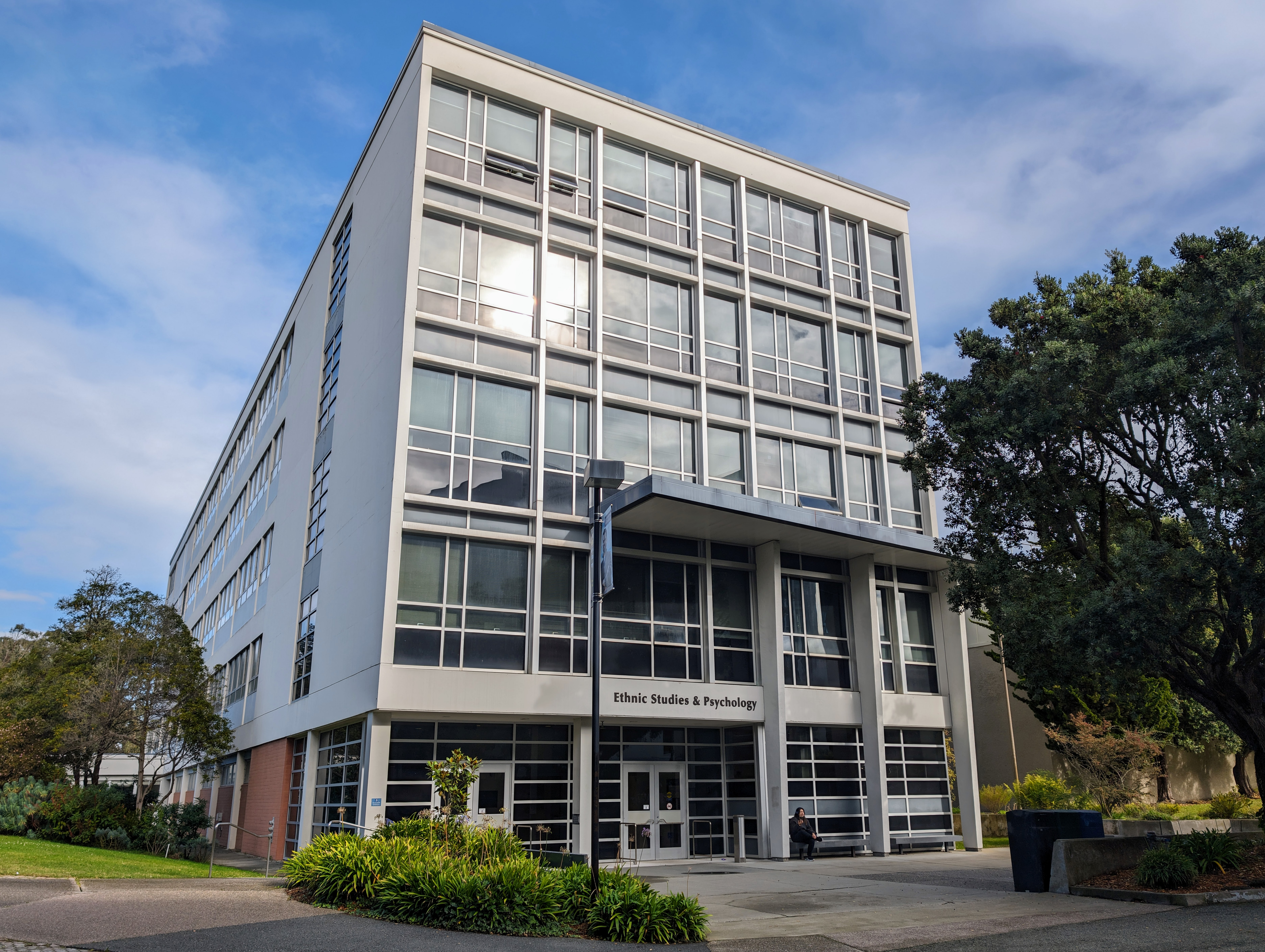
Ethnic Studies and Psychology Building

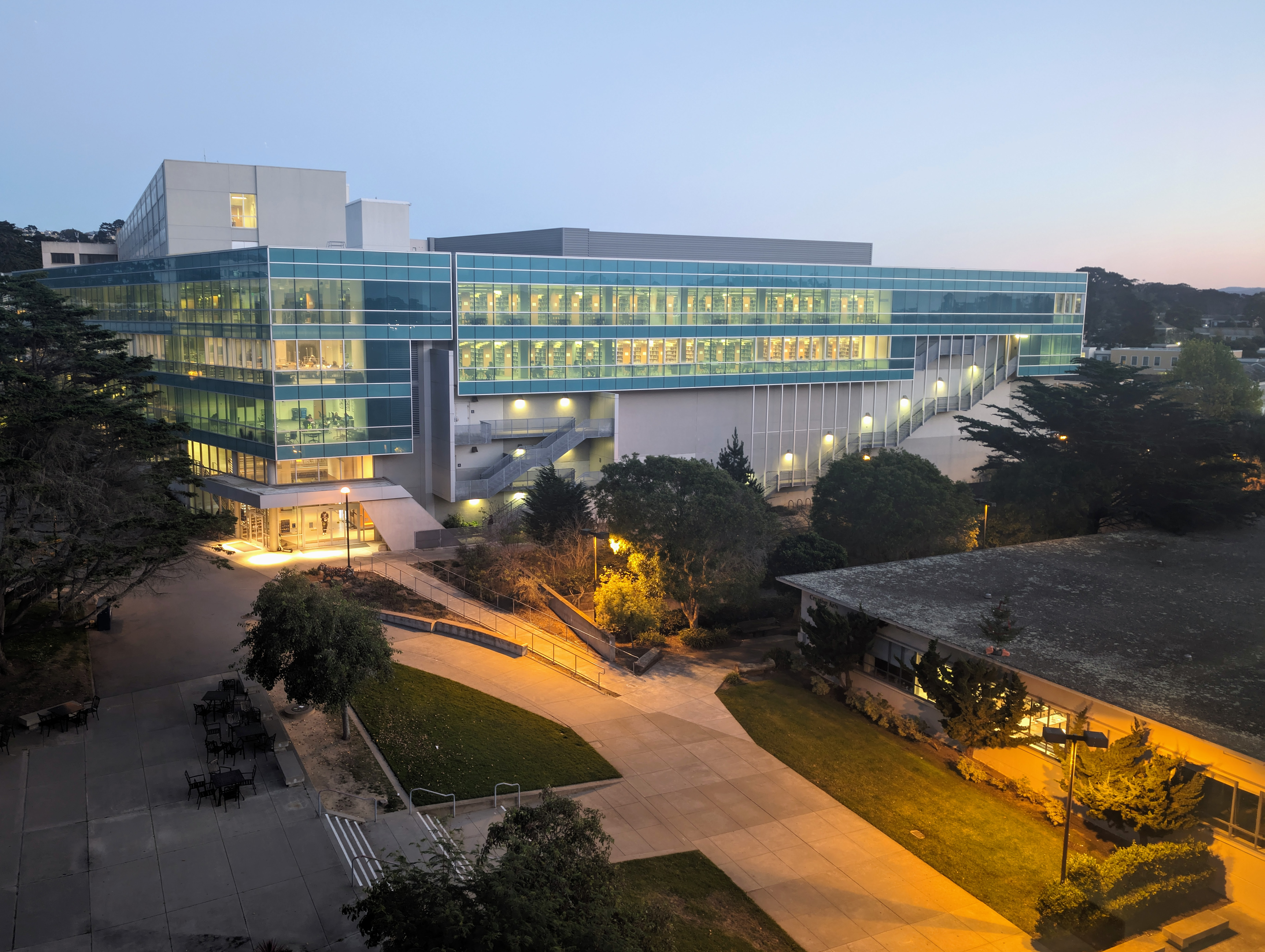
Library Building

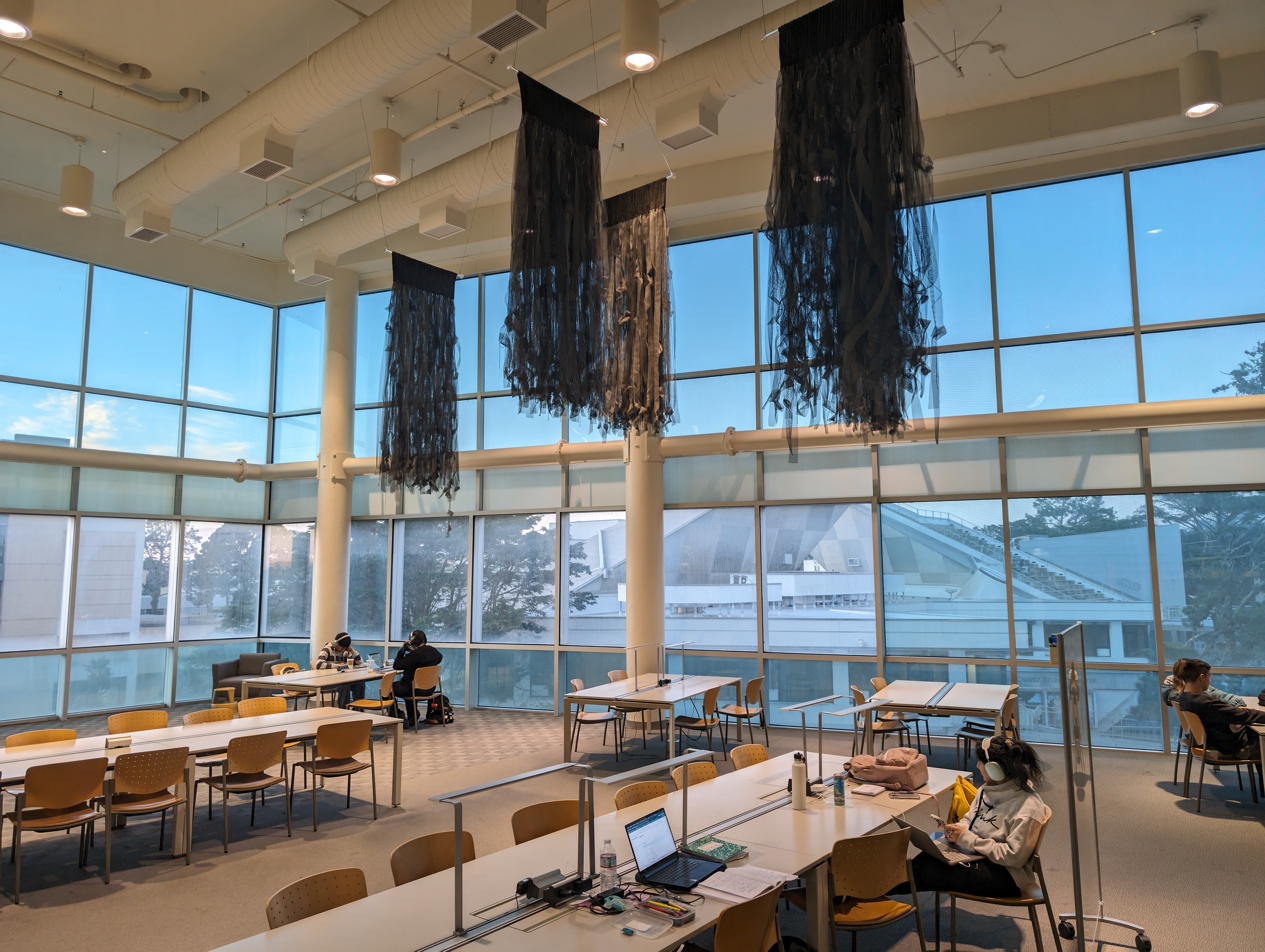
A seating area in the J. Paul Leonard Library

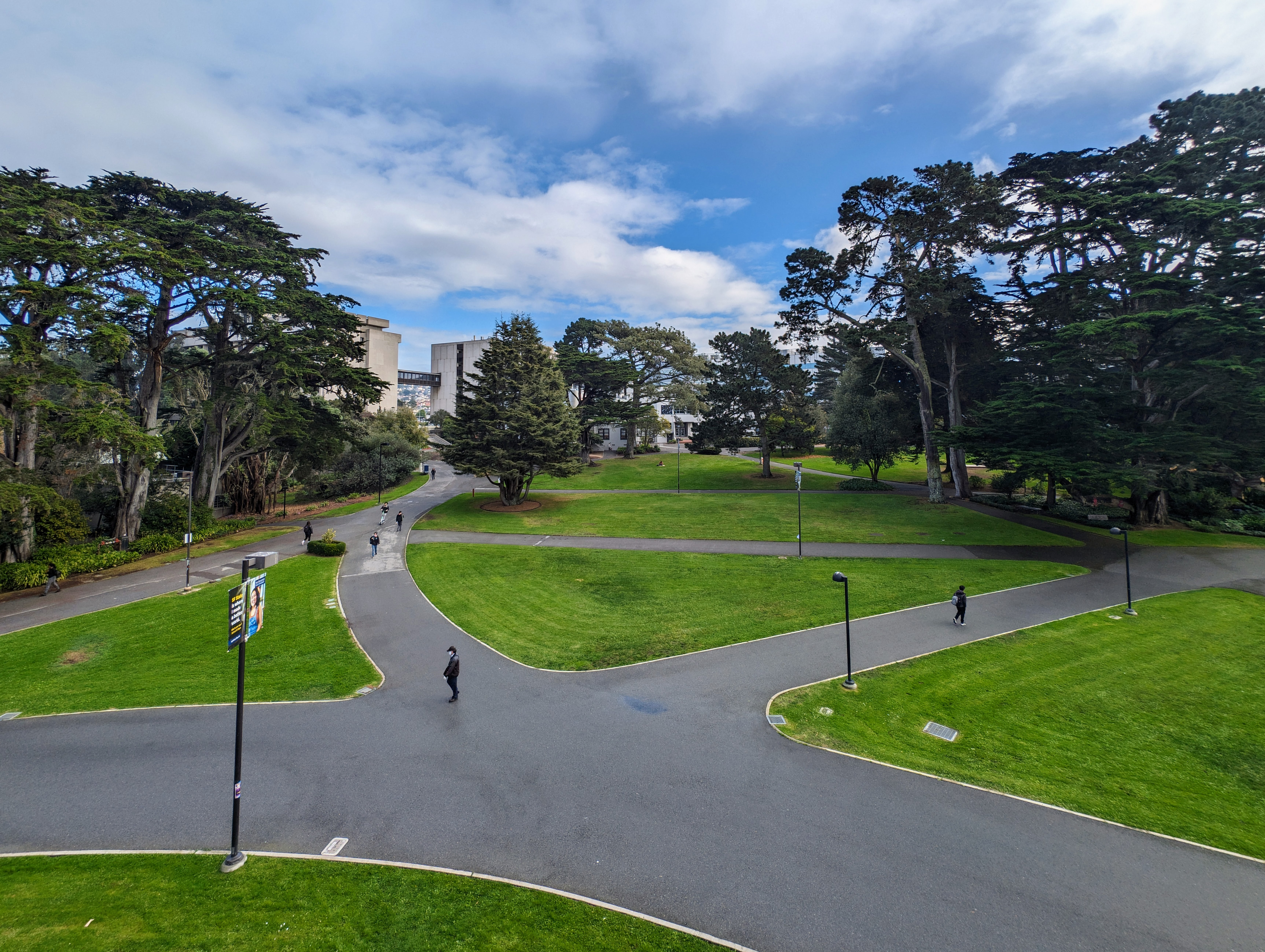
The Quad

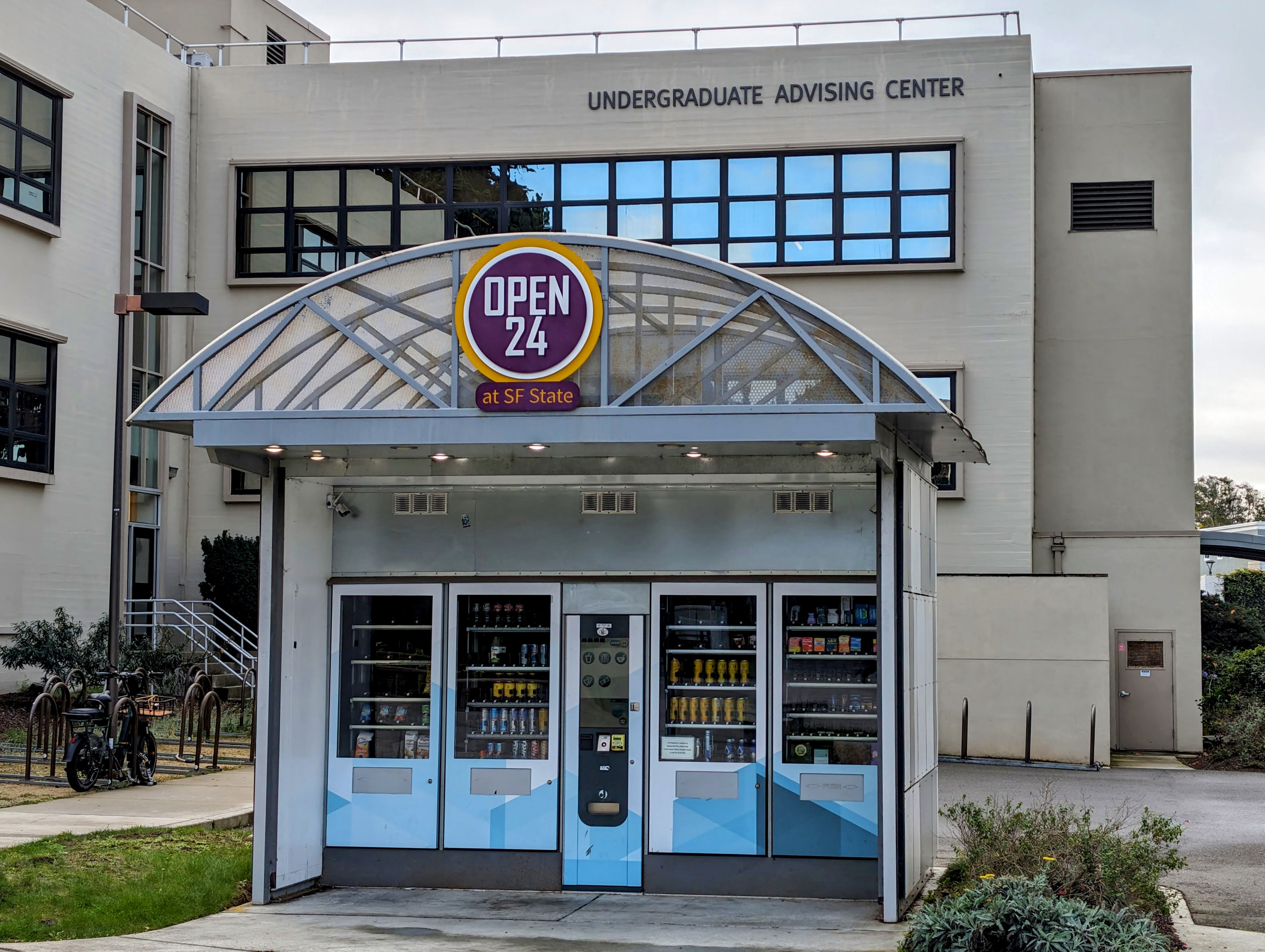
Open24

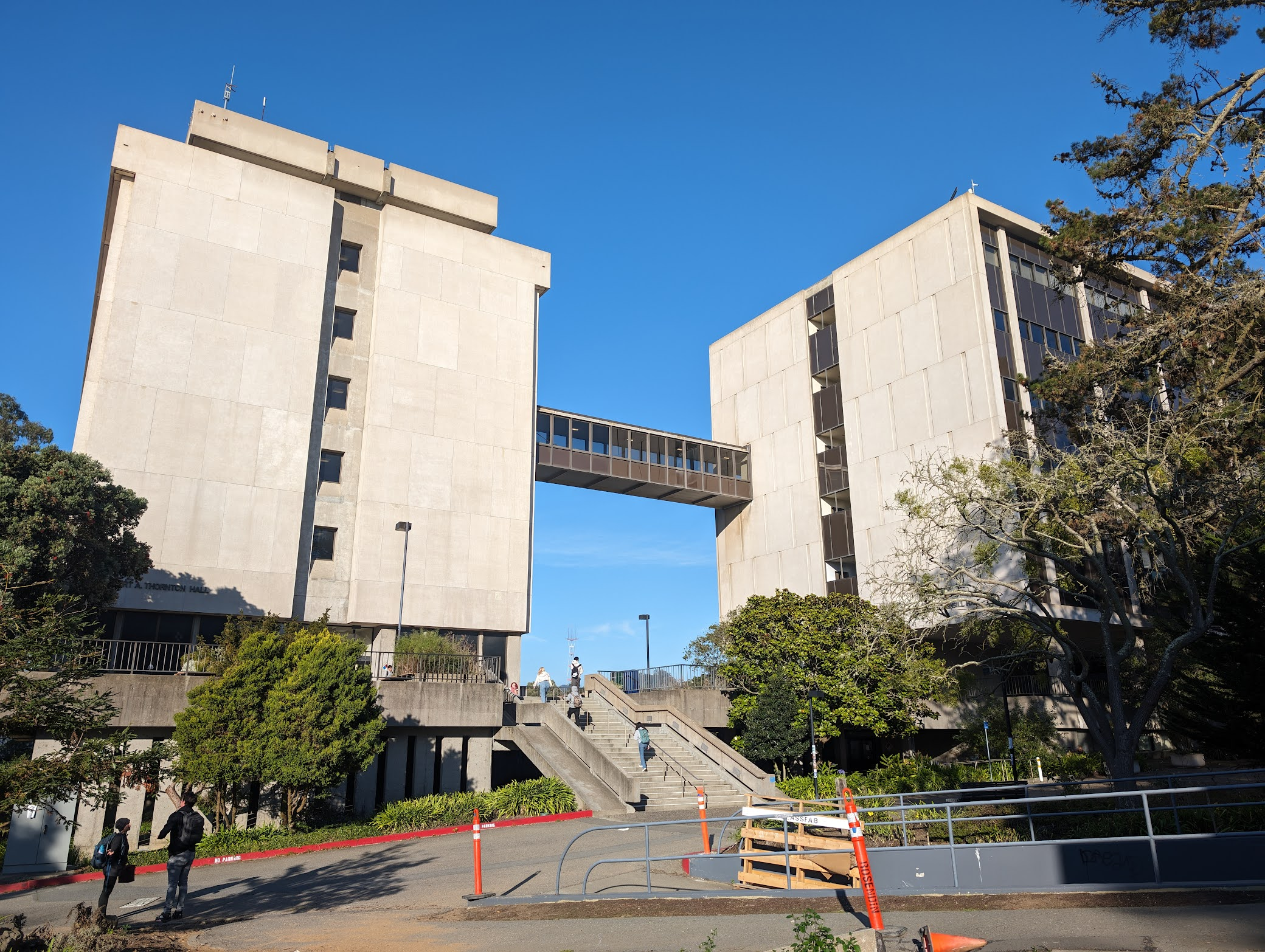
Thornton Hall and Hensill Hall

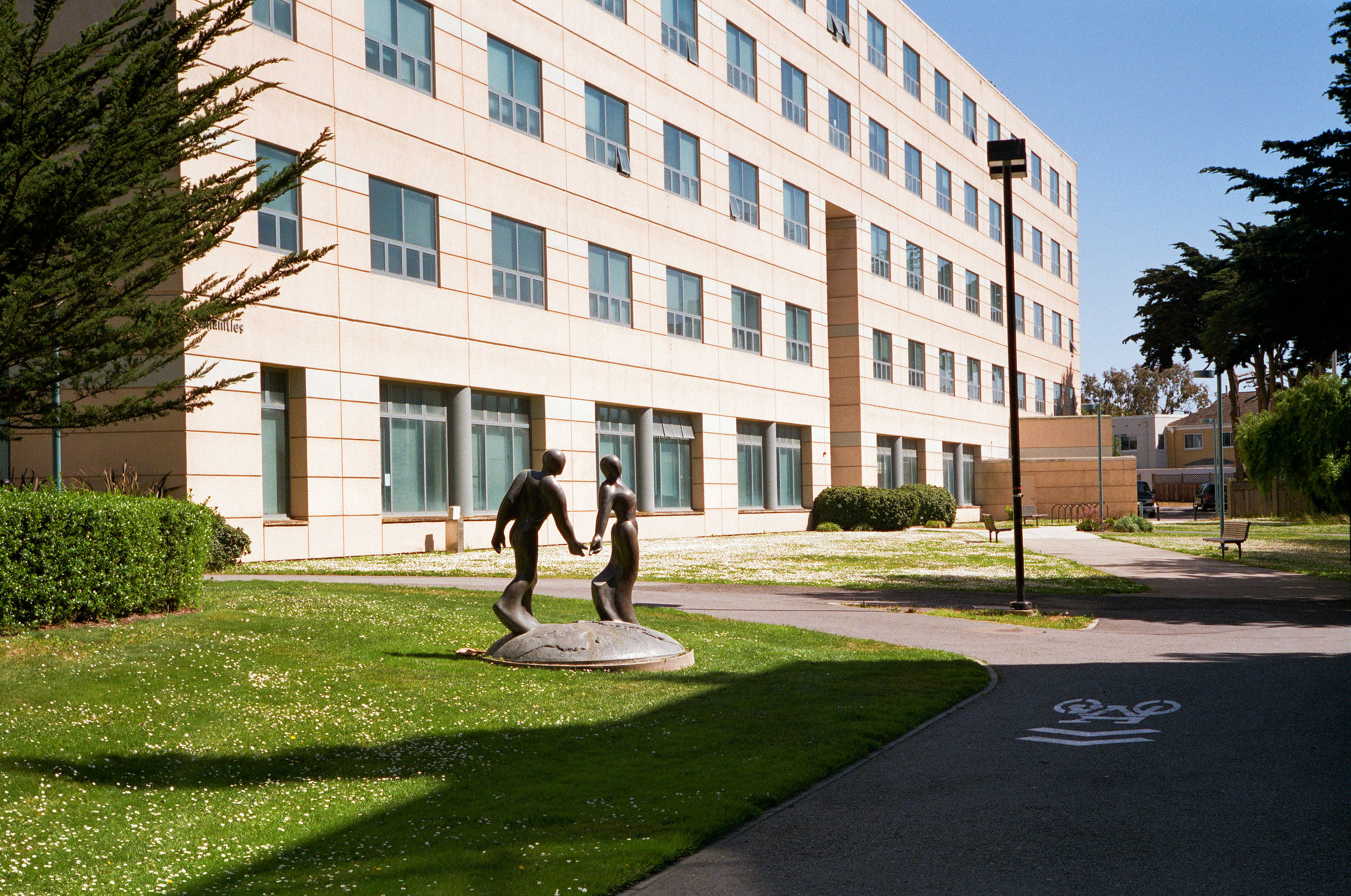
Humanities Building

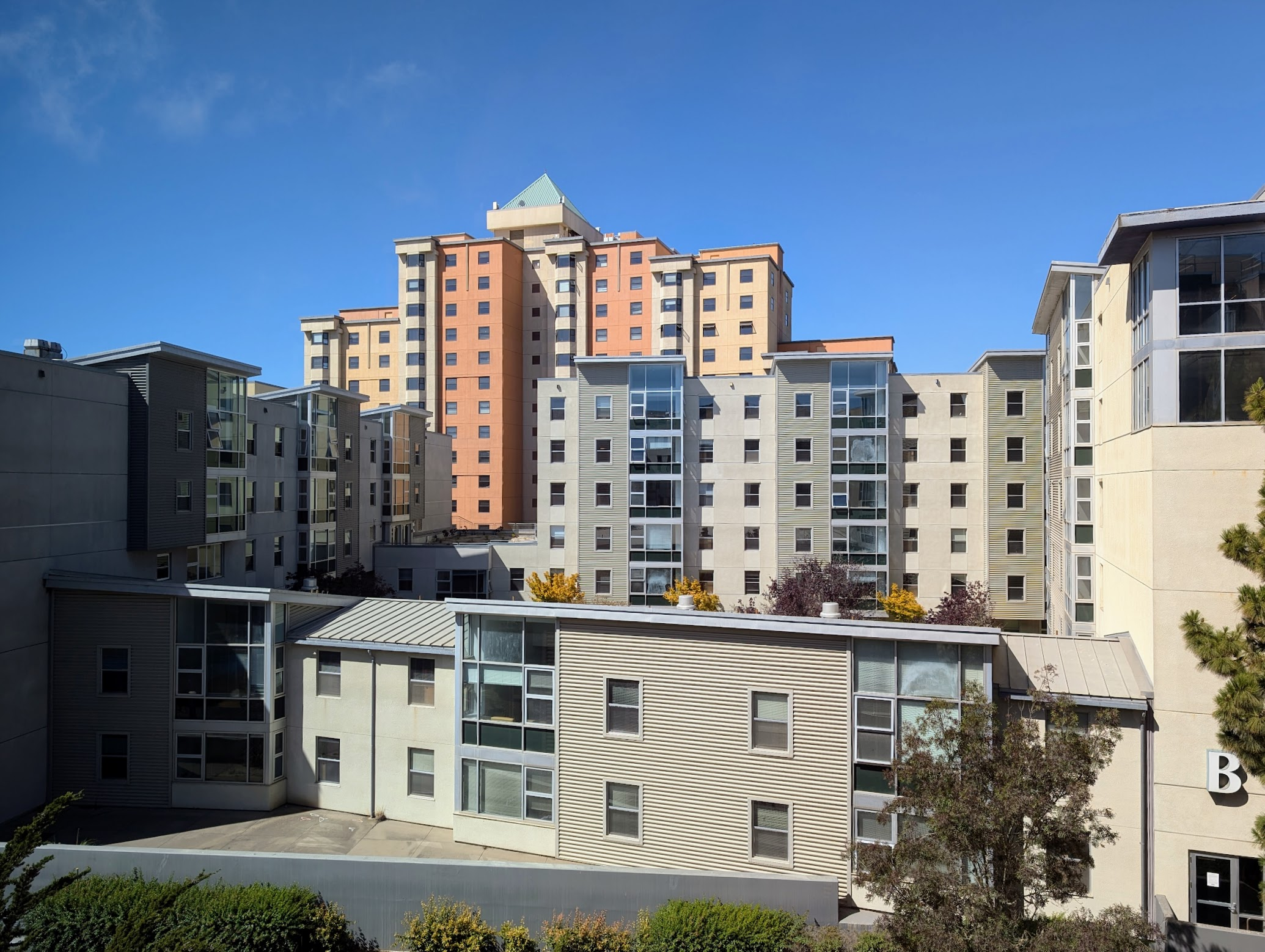
Student housing

== Satellite campuses ==
In addition to the main campus, the university also has satellite campuses, of which two are active and one is closed.

=== Downtown Campus (DTC) ===
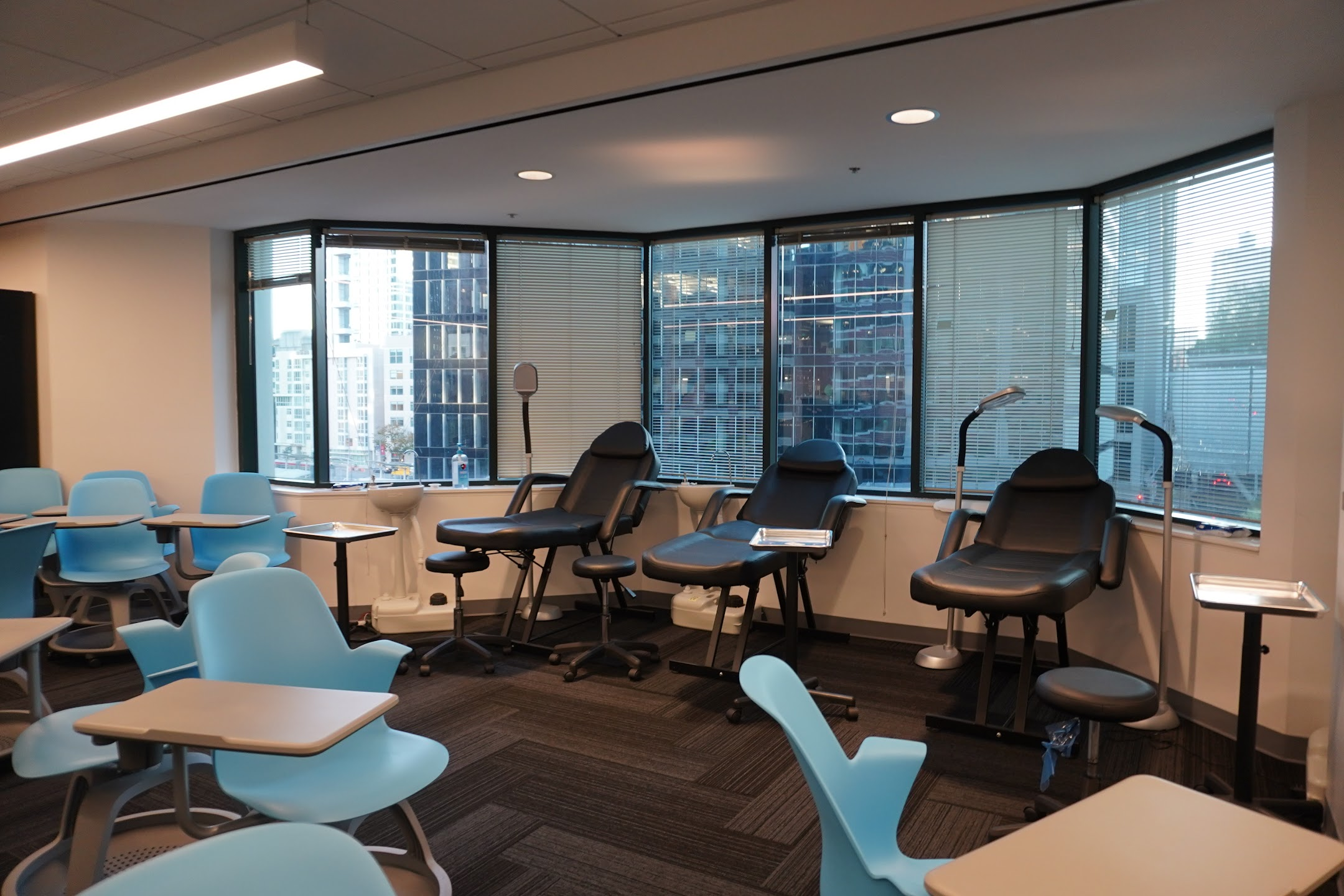
A classroom at the Downtown Campus

The Downtown Campus located on the fifth floor of 160 Spear St., in San Francisco, California. It is used and managed by the Lam Family College of Business and the College of Professional & Global Education (formerly College of Extended Learning). The campus spans approximately 15,850 square feet.

SF State has maintained facilities in Downtown San Francisco since the 1950s. The current Downtown Campus replaces the previous, underused campus that was located in the San Francisco Centre. The old Downtown Campus was a replacement for the Downtown Center located at 425 Market Street.

The campus has a student lounge, a computer lab, and study rooms. A portion of 160 Spear St.'s 12th floor was part of the campus until 2024.

=== Sierra Nevada Field Campus (SNFC) ===
The 7.1-acre Sierra Nevada Field Campus is located in Sierra County, near Yuba Pass and the Sierra Valley, at 35400 Hwy 49 in Calpine, California. It is over 200 miles north of the main campus.

Established in 1949, the campus was originally named Camp Leonard after SFSU's fifth president J. Paul Leonard. It started as a training facility for recreation leaders and added a children's camp in 1951. Basic plumbing was installed in 1953. The first three-unit college course was taught there in 1961. In 1970, under William Hammerman's leadership, it transitioned from a children's camp to a college-wide field campus.

The campus is currently funded primarily through its summer workshops and programs, with additional support from a nonprofit called Friends of the Sierra Nevada Field Campus. The existing buildings are the original structures from 1949.

The campus offers three to seven-day courses and workshops to students as well as the general public. Accredited, one-unit courses are processed by the College of Professional & Global Education. Workshops are not for credit and processed by the University Corporation. The campus is also used for research by graduate students of the College of Science and Engineering.

The campus operates from Memorial Day weekend to Labor Day weekend each year. The campus offers 35–40 different courses each summer through two programs: accredited classes through the College of Professional & Global Education, and non-credit workshops through the University Corporation.

Due to its remote location, there is no cell service and extremely limited internet access at the campus. Accommodations at the campus consist of tents with mattresses. Students and visitors can to bring their own tents or vehicles to sleep in, or stay off campus. The campus has a moderately high elevation of about 5522 feet or 1683 meters.

==== Buildings ====
There are three buildings at the campus.

- Director's Cabin
- Staff Cabin
- Dining Hall

=== Romberg Tiburon Campus (RTC) ===
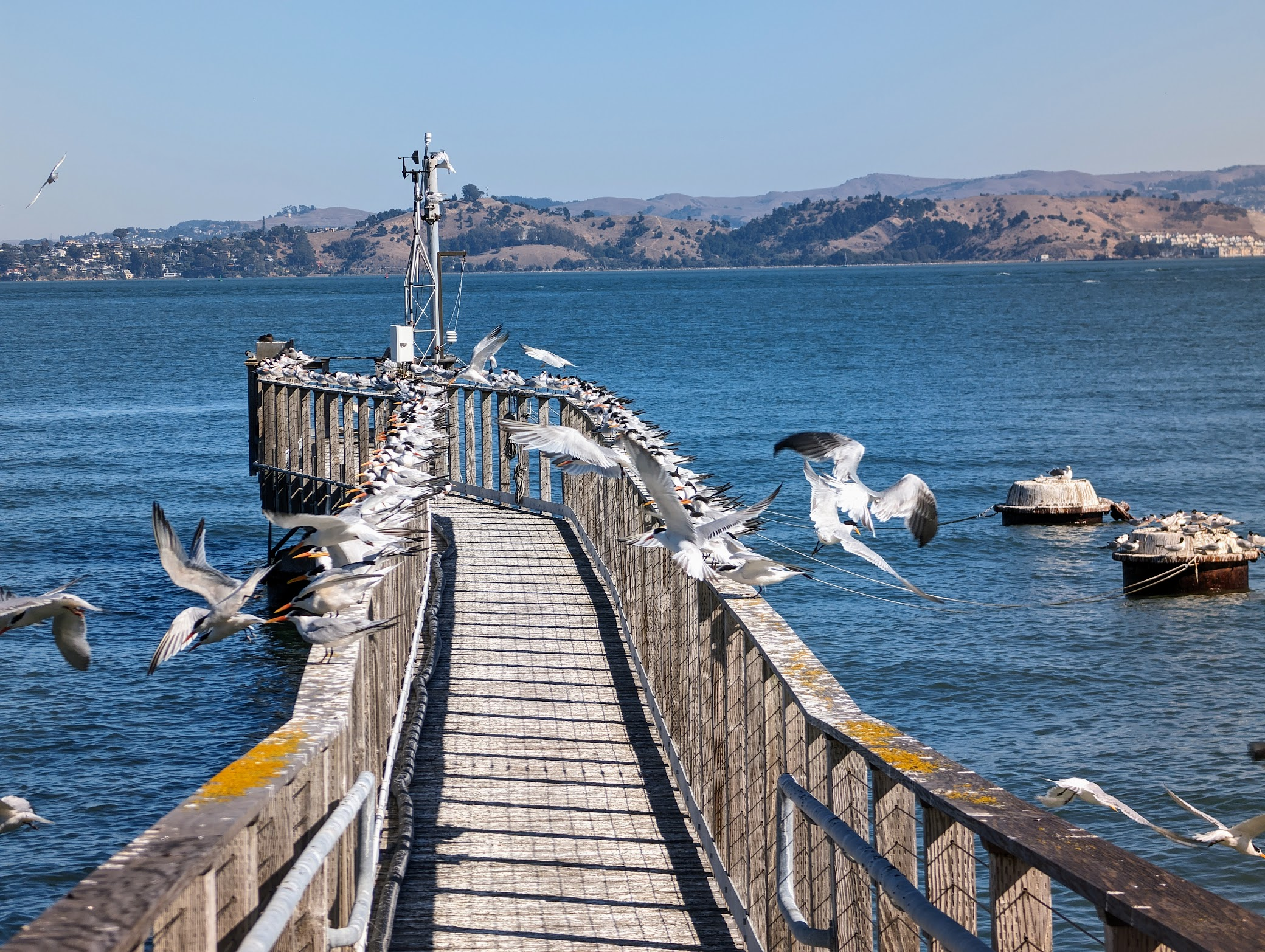
A pier at the Romberg Tiburon Campus

The Romberg Tiburon Campus was a 53.7-acre research campus located in Marin County, at 3150 and 3152 Paradise Drive in Tiburon, California. It was home to the only marine and environmental science lab on San Francisco Bay.

The Tiburon branch of the Smithsonian Environmental Research Center's Marine Invasions Lab and the offices for the San Francisco Bay National Estuarine Research Reserve were also located there.

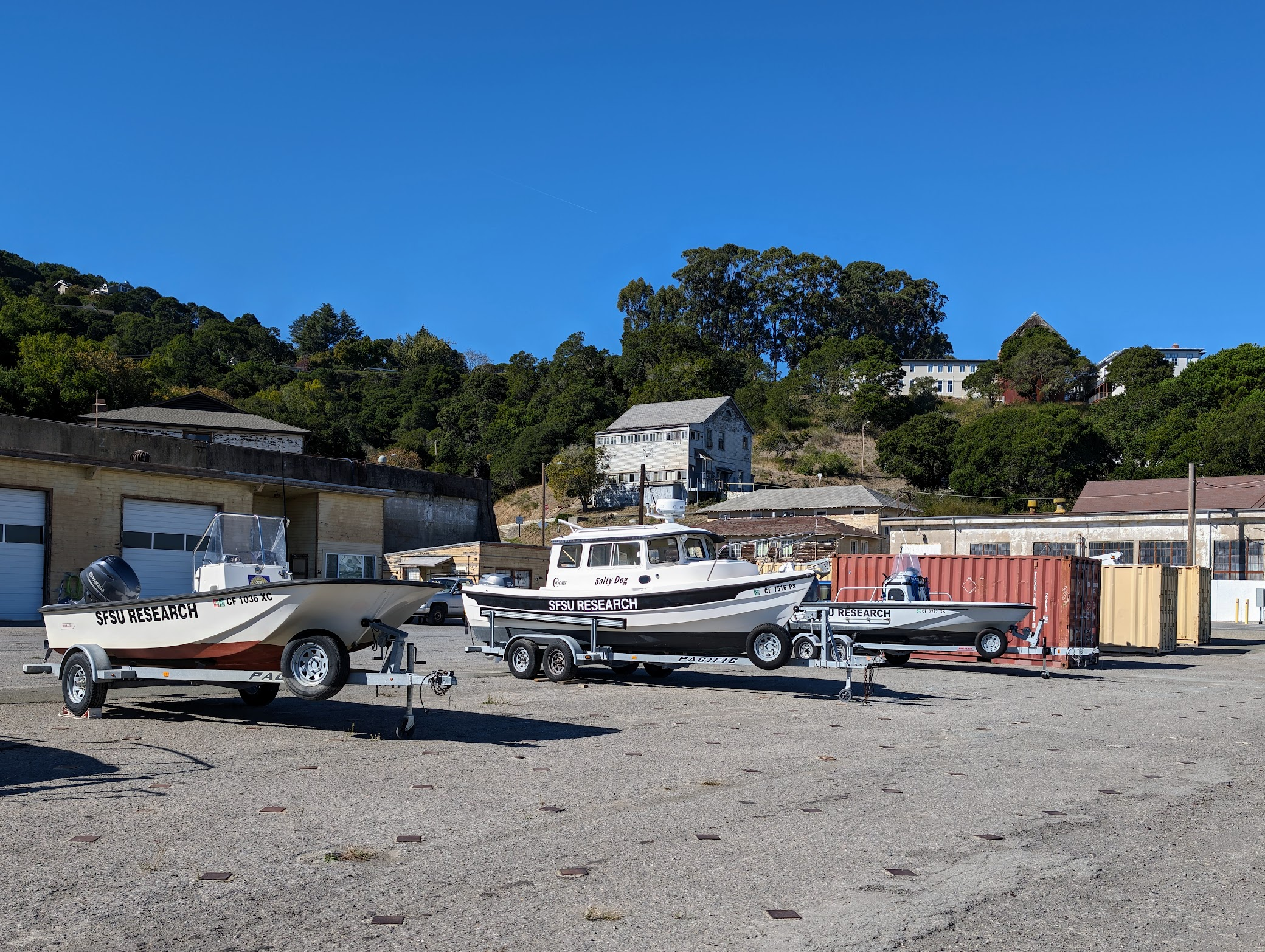
Research vessels at the Romberg Tiburon Campus

The campus was a former U.S. Navy base. SF State has operated a marine lab on the site since 1978, when it began acquiring the land from the federal government for $1, under the condition that the site be used for education.

A master plan was being drafted for the campus. It had never had a master plan formally prepared and adopted by the campus or the CSU Board of Trustees. An approved master plan and certified environmental impact statement were required before the university can begin significant construction projects at the campus.

In 2025, the university announced that this campus would close due to financial struggles, but the closure was delayed after a fundraising campaign yielded $3.2 million. It was announced in August 2026 that the campus would close by the end of September.

The university still retains ownership of the property.

==== Buildings ====
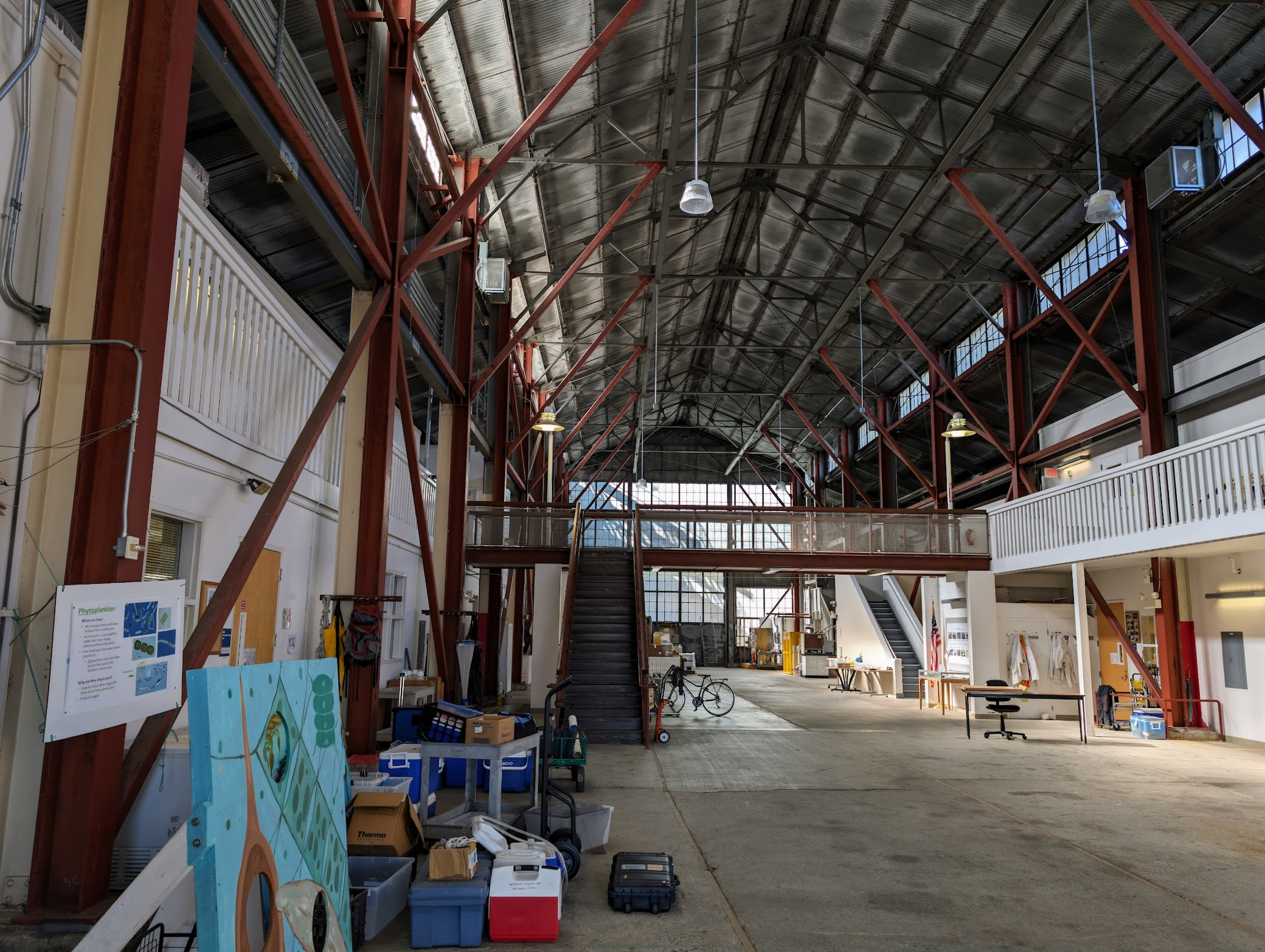
Inside Delta Hall

There were eight occupied buildings at the campus.

- Bay Conference Center (BCC)
- Delta Hall
- Estuary Hall
- Farallon Hall
- Greenhouse
- Ohrenschall Guest House
- N. Barracks
- S. Barracks

== Organization and administration ==
San Francisco State University is part of the California State University system. The CSU is governed by a 25-member Board of Trustees who oversee the system's chancellor. The president of SFSU reports to the chancellor and oversees six cabinet units. Cabinet units collaborate via 16 committees and work in conjunction with three semi-independent 501(c)(3) organizations that support the university. Each cabinet, except the Office of the President, is led by a vice president. The vice president of Academic Affairs is also university's provost and oversees 15 administrative units, including the university's seven colleges. Each college is led by a dean and consists of departments, led by department chairs, and schools, led by directors. Departments and schools are at the same administrative level.

=== Presidents ===
- Frederic Lister Burk (1899–1924)
- Archibald B. Anderson (1924–1927)
- Mary A. Ward (acting president, 1927)
- Alexander C. Roberts (1927–1945)
- J. Paul Leonard (1945–1957)
- Glenn Dumke (1957–1961)
- Frank L. Fenton (1961–1962)
- Paul A. Dodd (1962–1965)
- Stanley F. Paulson (1965–1966)
- John Summerskill (1966–1968)
- Robert R. Smith (1968)
- S. I. Hayakawa (1968–1973)
- Paul F. Romberg (1973–1983)
- Chia-Wei Woo (1983–1988)
- Robert A. Corrigan (1988–2012)
- Leslie Wong (2012–2019)
- Lynn Mahoney (2019–present)

== Academics ==
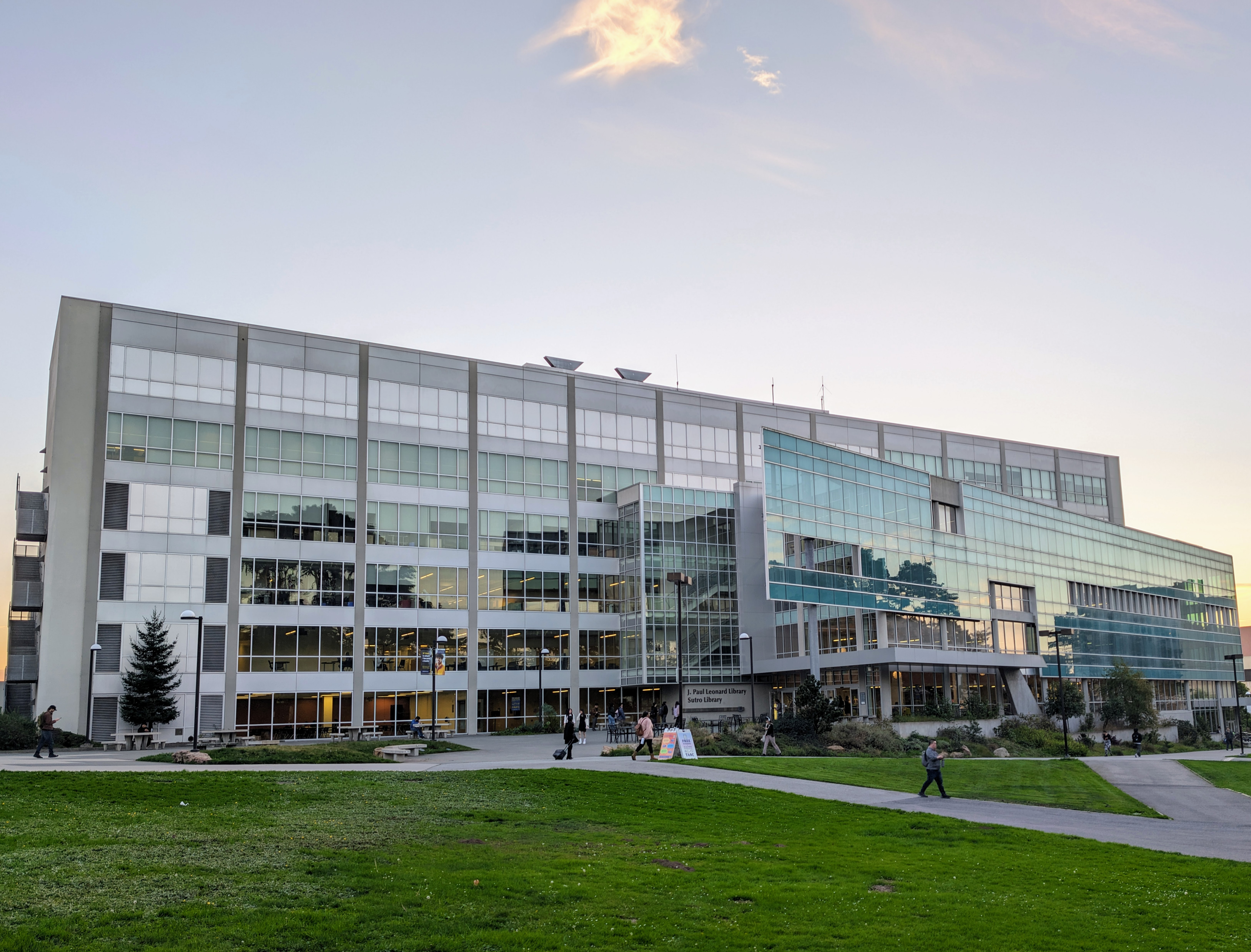
San Francisco State University's library

The university operates on a semester calendar. Students generally enroll in courses during the fall and spring semesters, but courses are also offered during the summer semester and winter session. Winter courses are not eligible for financial aid.

The university has a four-year graduation rate of 29% and a six-year graduation rate of 48.8%. The student-faculty ratio at SFSU was 25:1 in Spring 2025.

As of 2025, the university has 1,582 faculty comprising 690 tenured or tenure-track faculty, 882 lecturers, and 10 counselors.

=== Colleges ===
The university's seven colleges are:

- College of Liberal & Creative Arts
- Lam Family College of Business
- College of Ethnic Studies
- College Health and Social Sciences
- College of Science and Engineering
- Graduate College of Education
- College of Professional & Global Education

=== Undergraduate programs ===
SFSU offers 125 bachelor's degree programs across its seven colleges.

The most frequently enrolled undergraduate majors are Business Administration, Psychology, Biology, Computer Science, Criminal Justice Studies, Communication Studies, Early Childhood Education, Cinema, Physical Education, and Nursing.

The College of Health and Social Sciences also offers accelerated Bachelor of Science degrees in nursing in partnership with the City College of San Francisco and College of San Mateo.

=== Blended master's programs ===
SFSU offers 56 blended bachelor's and master's degree programs, called San Francisco State Scholars programs. The programs provide students an accelerated path to a graduate degree by allowing students to earn graduate credit while in their junior and/or senior years.

=== Graduate and professional programs ===
The university offers 36 master's degree programs across six colleges: College of Liberal & Creative Arts, Lam Family College of Business, College of Ethnic Studies, College Health and Social Sciences, College of Science and Engineering, and Graduate College of Education.

The Graduate College of Education offers two doctoral programs: Ph.D in special education, in partnership with University of California, Berkeley and Ed.D in Educational Leadership. The College of Health and Social Sciences offers a DPT program in partnership with University of California, San Francisco. The Graduate College of Education also offers 22 teaching credential programs.

=== Other academic programs ===
==== Experimental College ====
The original Experimental College, known as E.C., was created in 1965 and lasted until 1969. The revived Experimental College, known as EXCO, allows students to create curriculums and teach one-unit courses about any topic. EXCO is administered by the university's Department of Undergraduate Education and Academic Planning.

==== Open University ====
Those without formal admission to the university can enroll in undergraduate or graduate courses on a space-available basis, through the College of Professional & Global Education's Open University program. Up to 24 undergraduate units can be applied towards a bachelor's degree or six units towards a master's degree at SF State. The program is open to everybody except SFSU students. This is the university's concurrent enrollment program.

==== ElderCollege ====
ElderCollege is a noncredit program provided by the College of Professional & Global Education that allows people aged 50 and older to sit in on courses on a space-available basis, with the approval of an instructor. There are no official records of enrollment, attendance, or grades as ElderCollege students participate only for their personal benefit. ElderCollege students are expected to attend regularly and participate, but are not expected to take exams or write papers.

==== Osher Lifelong Learning Institute ====
SFSU's Osher Lifelong Learning Institute, or OLLI, was founded in 2003. OLLIs are education organizations for older adults that are operated independently. SFSU's OLLI provides six-week courses and "mini courses" intended for people 50 and older, but people under 50 may join. The courses are not for credit. OLLI does not use SFSU's semester calendar and has its own five-session academic calendar in which six-week courses are taught; the sessions are spring, summer, late summer, fall, and winter. Membership is required to attend six-week courses, while mini courses are open to non-members. Mini courses consist of one to three class meetings. Courses are either on Zoom or in person at SFSU's Downtown Campus. OLLI also offers interest groups and social events.

=== Accreditation ===
The university is accredited by the Western Association of Schools and Colleges Commission for Senior Colleges and Universities. Its colleges and programs are accredited by various commissions.

=== Rankings and distinctions ===
Academic rankings

National
- Forbes: 186
- U.S. News & World Report: 208
- Washington Monthly: 76

Global
- QS: 1401+
- U.S. News & World Report: 1526

2025–2026 USNWR National Program Rankings
Top Public Schools	115
Top Performers on Social Mobility	30
Best Undergraduate Engineering Programs	46 (At schools where doctorate not offered)
Nursing	98
Economics	205

2025 USNWR Graduate School Rankings
Program	Ranking
Social Work	83
Speech–language pathology	92
Public Affairs	96
Public Health	116
Fine Arts	124

Top 10 foreign countries in headcount (Fall 2025)
Country	Headcount
India	291
China	67
Vietnam	57
Japan	46
Nepal	38
Taiwan	35
Myanmar	30
South Korea	27
Mexico	18
Germany	16
Germany	16

In 2025, SFSU was ranked the 20th university in the United States by PayScale and CollegeNET's Social Mobility Index university rankings.

== Admissions and cost ==
Undergraduate admission statistics
	Fall 2025	Fall 2024	Fall 2023	Fall 2022	Fall 2021
First-time Freshmen
Applicants	28,200	30,246	31,924	30,966	27,777
Admits	25,451	27,215	28,727	28,195	25,809
Admit rate	90%	90%	90%	91%	93%
Enrolled	2,077	2,340	2,988	3,339	3,149
Yield rate	8%	9%	10%	12%	12%
Transfers
Applicants	11,505	11,596	12,189	12,483	14,699
Admits	10,256	10,258	10,717	10,995	13,375
Admit rate	89%	88%	88%	88%	91%
Enrolled	2,323	2,316	2,473	2,305	2,986
Yield rate	23%	23%	23%	21%	22%

In Fall 2024, SFSU's total enrollment was 22,357. This included 19,337 undergraduate students and 3,020 postgraduate students. 96% of undergraduate students enrolled at the university in 2022 were California residents.

SFSU uses Cal State Apply, the centralized application system for all 23 CSU campuses. There is a $70 fee per application, but fee waivers are available.

The university does not use school rank, personal statements and essays, letters of recommendation, legacy status, or standardized test scores in the admissions process.

Once admitted, students pay tuition set by the CSU and fees set by SFSU. The tuition paid by a student depends on whether they're a California resident, the number of units they're enrolled in, and the type of program they're enrolled in. Fees set by SFSU fund various campus programs.

CSU employees and their dependents may have their campus fees and part of their tuitions waived. Eligible veterans and their children may have their tuition and fees waived.

The university's financial aid office estimates that housing costs will be the bulk the cost of attendance. 64% of students receive some form of financial aid including grants, work-study awards, and loans.

== Student body ==
Undergraduate demographics as of Fall 2023
Race and ethnicity	Total
Hispanic	39%
Asian	23%
White	15%
Other (Note: Other consists of Multiracial Americans & those who prefer to not say.)	10%
Black	6%
Foreign national	4%
Pacific Islander	1%
Economic diversity
Low-income (Note: The percentage of students who received an income-based federal Pell grant intended for low-income students.)	48%
Affluent or middle-class (Note: The percentage of students who are a part of the American middle class at the bare minimum.)	52%

In 2021, SFSU was ranked fifth for diversity nationwide and third for diversity in the western U.S. by The Wall Street Journal.

SFSU has the second largest Asian and Filipino American enrollment percentage in the CSU system.

== Student life ==
=== Student organizations ===
As of August 2025, SFSU has 300 formally recognized student organizations. In order to receive funding, student organizations must be formally recognized by the Office of Student Activities & Events. 49 Greek life organizations are formally recognized.

=== Housing ===
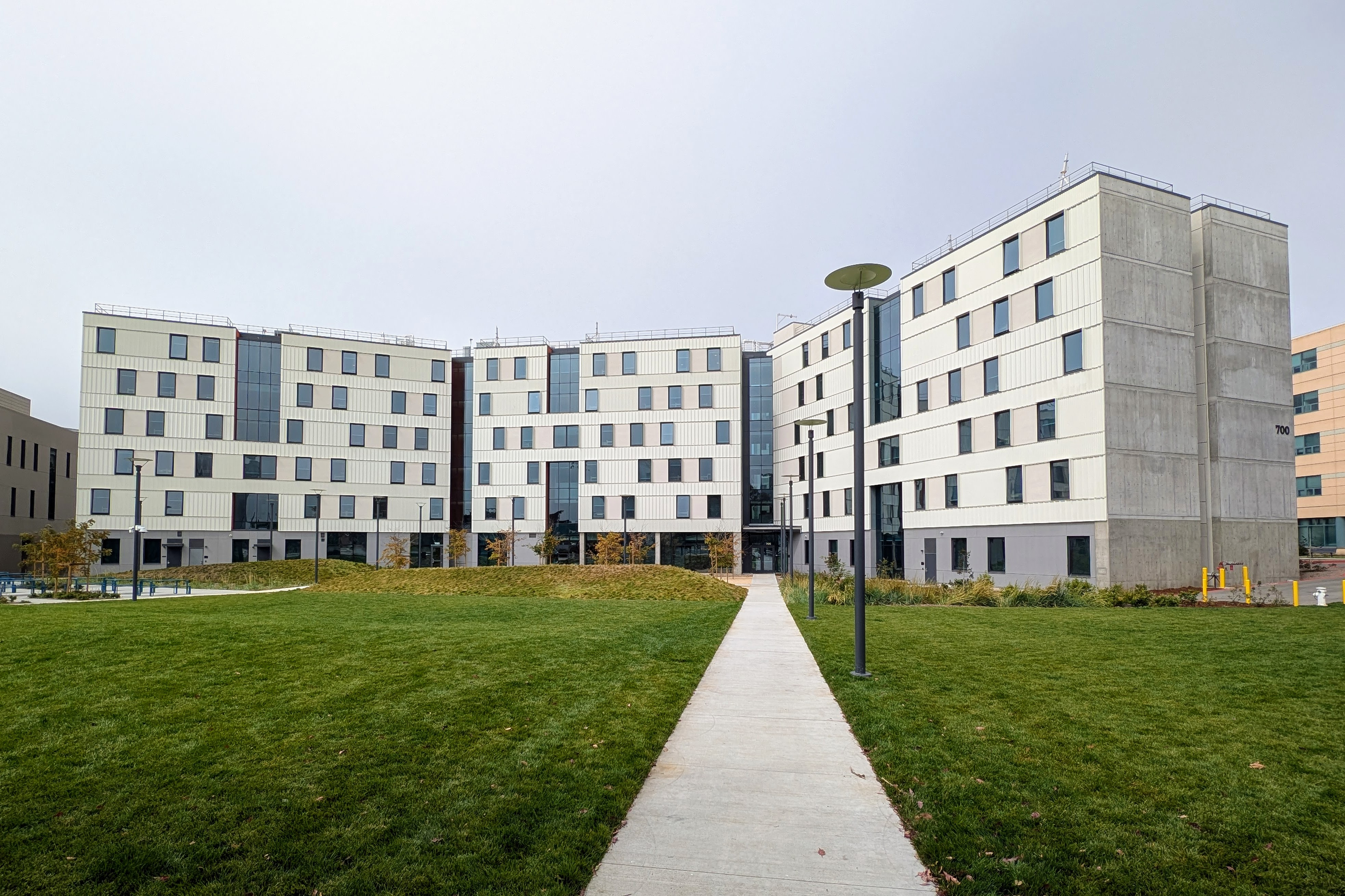
The university's newest student housing building, West Grove Commons, in July 2025.

SFSU has three on-campus housing neighborhoods: the Central Neighborhood, which only houses first-year students, and the North and South Neighborhoods. These neighborhoods are further divided into housing communities. Also Parkmerced, a planned neighborhood consisting of high-rise and low-rise apartments, is located immediately south of the university.

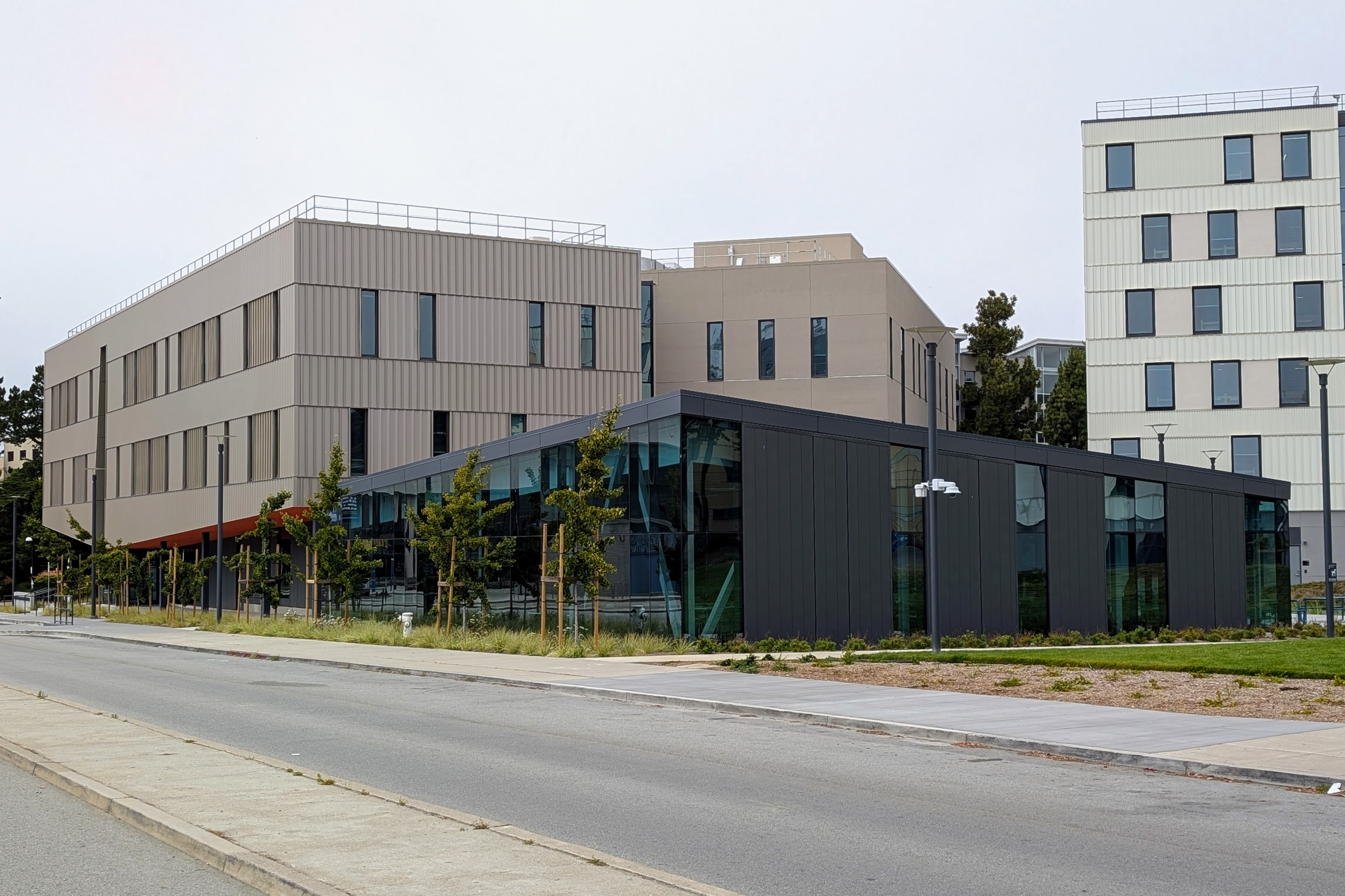
The Gator Student Health Center building, seen in July 2025, houses SFSU's health services and the Yerba Buena Dining Hall.

=== Facilities ===
==== Health ====
The Gator Student Health Center building opened in 2025 as part of the West Grove Commons project, which included the West Grove Commons dorm building. The project cost $178.9 million, with $116.3 million of the amount covered by an affordable housing grant from the state.

Student Health Services, or SHS, operates out of the Gator Student Health Center. Primary care, vaccinations, x-rays, pharmacy services, gynecology services, and STI testing are some of the services provided. Many of the services are low-cost or provided at no charge to students. In 2023, state law required abortion services to be provided at all SHS locations, which are located at all CSU campuses. SHS is accredited by the Accreditation Association for Ambulatory Health Care.

Counseling and Psychological Services, or CAPS, also operates in the Gator Student Health Center building and provides free mental health care to students.

==== Recreation ====
The main recreation facility at SF State, Mashouf Wellness Center, opened in 2017. It is named after Manny Mashouf, who donated $10 million towards the $86.5 million construction costs. The LEED Platinum certified, 118,700-square-foot facility features two heated pools, a hot tub, a sauna, a 41-foot climbing wall, fitness studios, exercise equipment, an indoor running track, a racquetball court, a two basketball courts, a multipurpose activities court. It was also the university's first LEED rated building.

In addition, the university's Gymnasium building has a pool and multi-use spaces. The building is mostly used for basketball, volleyball, badminton, and indoor soccer events.

==== J. Paul Leonard Library ====
Named after the university's fourth president, the J. Paul Leonard Library houses a collection that includes government documents, maps, sound and visual recordings, in addition to books. Approximately 75% of the library's circulating collection is stored in its 45-foot-tall library retrieval system, which was installed between 2008 and 2012, when the library building underwent a renovation and expansion, adding more than 140,000 square feet; also, the addition of the system, which can store approximately a million items, removed the need for book stacks, freeing up space for other uses.

The library building was constructed in three phases in 1953, 1959 and 1971 and used to only house the J. Paul Leonard Library. After the expansion and renovation, the Sutro Library was moved to the fifth and sixth floors of the building.

The Sutro Library, a branch of the California State Library, houses the largest collection of genealogical records west of Salt Lake City.

==== Sutro Library ====
The Sutro Library is a branch of the California State Library on the main campus of the university. The foundation of the library's collection was assembled by former San Francisco mayor Adolph Sutro. The library was deeded to the State of California by Sutro's heirs with the stipulation that it never leave the city limits of San Francisco, filling his desire to provide the city with a public research library. It was formally given to California State Library in 1913, and opened to the public in 1917. Notably, half of the Sutro collection survived the "Great Fire" after the San Francisco earthquake of 1906. Collection highlights include 125,000 rare books, antiquarian maps, and archival collections, as well as a genealogical library.

==== Poetry ====
The Poetry Center, founded in 1954 by a $100 gift from W. H. Auden, and the American Poetry Archives, established in 1973, are housed within the College of Liberal and Creative Arts and contain the nation's largest publicly-accessible collection of poetry on tape.

=== Associated Students ===
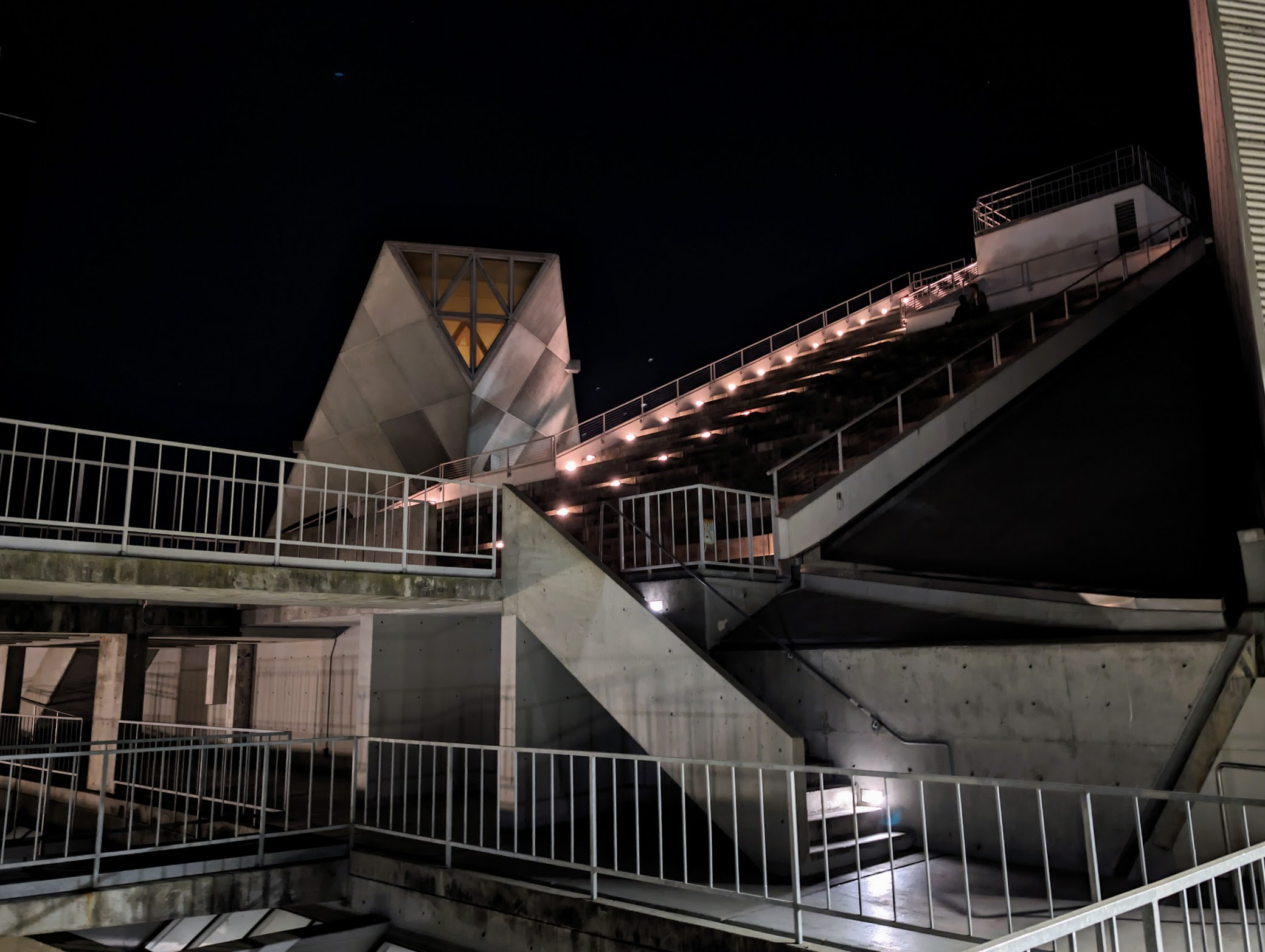
The top of the Student Center at night

The student government is known as Associated Students Inc. of SF State. Associated Students provides funding for student organizations and operates the Student Center, the Early Childhood Education Center, two food pantry programs, a book loan program, a weekly farmers' market, and many other programs and events.

==== Student Center ====
The Student Center was completed in 1975 with a capacity of 12,000 students. It was named the Cesar Chavez Student Center until 2026, when allegations surfaced. The building is currently awaiting a new name. Around 2002, it was renovated and expanded to 142,160 square feet across five floors with a capacity of over 30,000. The building includes staff and student offices, a 500-seat auditorium, conference rooms, an art gallery, a multi-cultural center, student lounges, restaurants, a bookstore, and additional restrooms. In 2003, the Filipino American Community Mural at the center was unveiled, becoming the first Filipino-American mural on a CSU campus.

==== Project Rebound ====
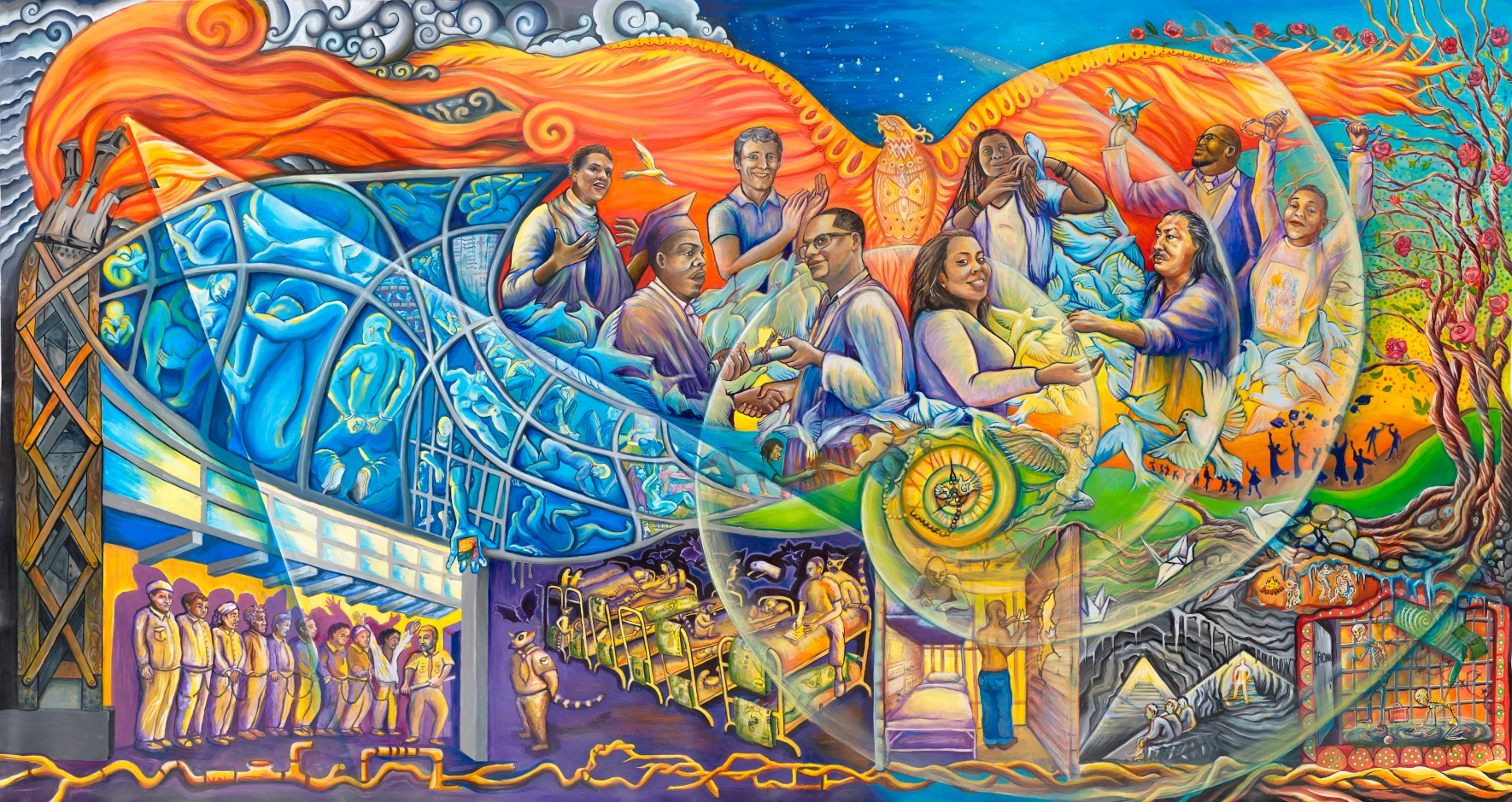
In 2015, the mural "From Incarceration to Liberation", a collaboration between Project Rebound and True Colors Mural Project of Berkeley City College, was installed inside the Student Center on the terrace level (3rd floor).

Project Rebound is a special admissions and support program for formerly incarcerated students. The program was started in San Francisco State's Sociology Department by John Keith Irwin in 1967, who had spent five years incarcerated in 1950. In 1999/2000, Project Rebound relocated from Sociology to Associated Students. Project Rebound has expanded to 20 of the 23 California State University campuses as of June 2025. It was recognized in November 2024 by the American Society of Criminology with the President's Award for Distinguished Contributions to Justice.

==== Rhythms Music Festival ====
The annual event started as a joke when a student, Franko Ali, made a Facebook group called "RAVE IN THE ANNEX – Approved if 15,000 SF State Students join this group." Over 5,000 people joined. In 2010, a year after Ali made the group, he was elected to the student government. A three-day music festival resulted. The first festival took place in March 2011.

Year	Headliners	Notes
2011	Grieves, Budo, The Hood Internet, Toro y Moi	
2012	Toro y Moi	Del the Funky Homosapien and K Theory were openers.
2013	Big Boi	
2014	Timeflies	Brenmar, a Chicago-based DJ, was the opener.
2015	G-Eazy	Oakland singer Devon Baldwin and Los Angeles rapper Casey Veggies were surprise guests.
2016	Kehlani	K. Flay and Moxie Raia also performed.
2017	Vince Staples	Trapo, a rapper, also performed.
2018	T-Pain	Caleborate, a rapper, was the opener.
2019	Hayley Kiyoko	Ruby Ibarra was the opener.
2020	Bishop Briggs	This year's main concert was planned to be held at the Fort Mason Festival Pavilion instead of the Annex, but was canceled due to the COVID-19 pandemic.
2021	Rico Nasty	The festival was held over Zoom.
2022	Baby Tate	Phony Ppl was the opener.
2023	Lupe Fiasco	Oompa was the opener.
2024	Destroy Lonely	Redveil was the opener.
2025	Daya	J Noa was the opener.
2026	Mike Sherm	P-Lo was the opener.

=== Annual Folk Festival ===
Associated Students hosted the annual San Francisco State College Folk Festival from 1962 to 1970. The 2nd Annual Folk Festival included performances by Jerry Garcia and Robert Hunter.

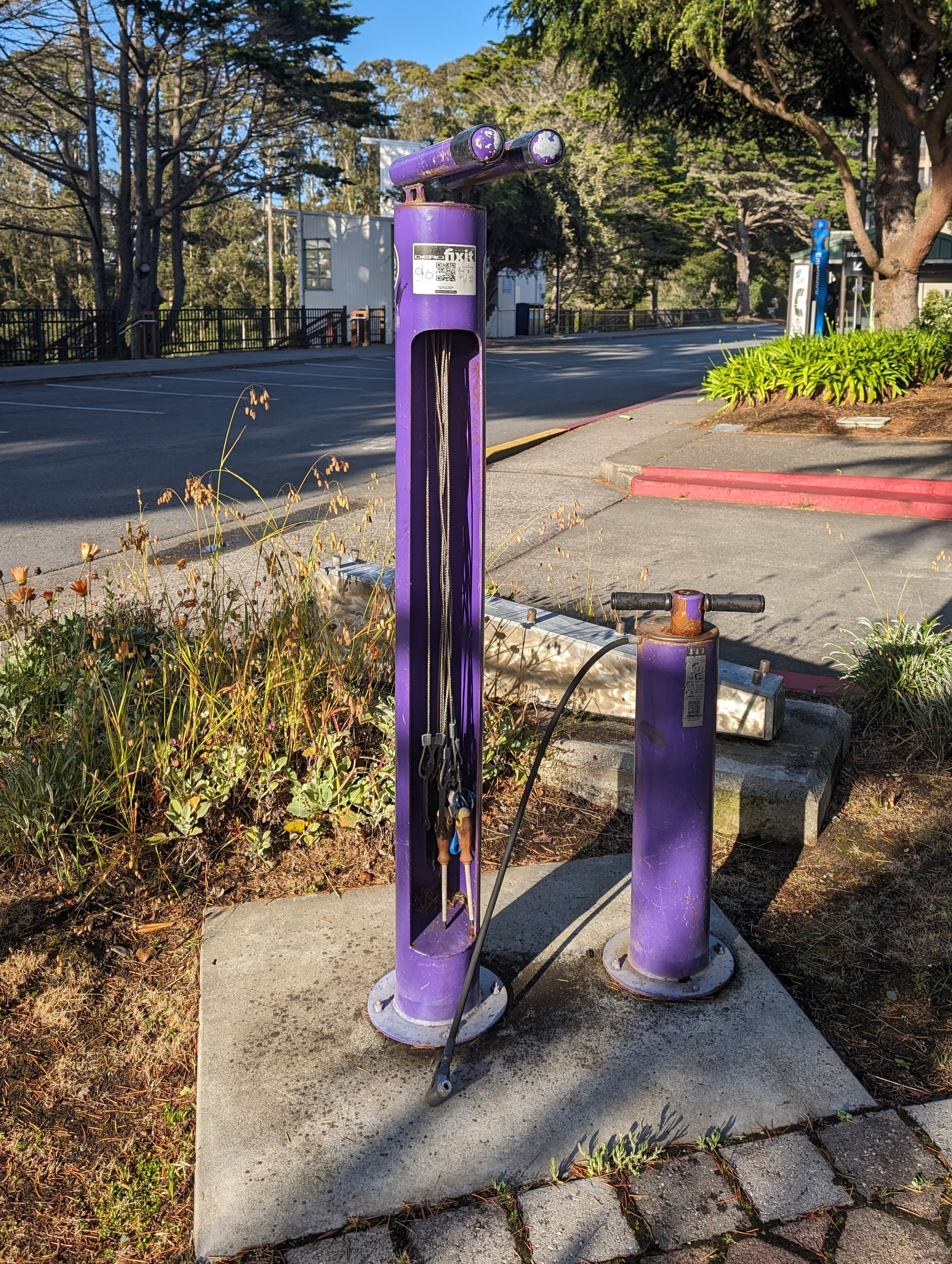
A bike maintenance station with tools attached to cables, near the university's Gymnasium.

=== Bicycling ===
SFSU was designated by the League of American Bicyclists as a bronze-level bicycle friendly university in 2016.

From 1996 to 2017, there was a staffed, enclosed bike storage area in a parking garage the rear of the Gymnasium building. The Bike Barn had the capacity for up to 200 bicycles, skateboards, and scooters. It was closed due to lack of usage and funding. It suffered from a lack of funding, maintenance, and publicity before it closed.

=== Media ===
==== Golden Gate Xpress ====
Golden Gate Xpress is the university's daily online student newspaper. The university's newspaper has changed names several times, but its history can be traced back to 1899. Golden Gate Xpress has been awarded by the Associated Collegiate Press, College Media Association, and the Hearst Journalism Awards Program.

==== Xpress Magazine ====
Xpress Magazine is a free student magazine published during the fall and spring semesters. Four issues are published per semester, two of which are also printed. The magazine was originally known as Prism and dates back December 1969. In October 1999, the magazine was published for the first time under its current name. Xpress Magazine has been awarded by the Associated Collegiate Press.

==== SF State Magazine ====
The university's Strategic Marketing and Communications department publishes SF State Magazine. The semiannual publication is mailed to over 80,000 alumni.

==== Transfer Magazine ====
Since 1950, undergraduate students in the Creative Writing department have published Transfer Magazine, featuring literature and art by SFSU students.

==== Fourteen Hills ====
Creative Writing graduate students have published Fourteen Hills, an international literary journal, since 1994.

==== Urban Action ====
Students enrolled in Urban Planning and Studies courses at the university have been publishing Urban Action, an annual journal consisting of research papers, photo essays, and other works. The journal started in 1979.

==== Sutro Review ====
Since 2016, the Department of English Language and Literature has published Sutro Review: SF State Journal for Undergraduate Composition, an academic journal for writing and art by undergraduates, edited by graduate students.

==== KSFS ====
KSFS is a college radio station run by Broadcast and Electronic Communication Arts (BECA) students, streaming online, at 100.7 on Comcast Cable radio in San Francisco, and at 88.1 FM near or at the main campus.

== Athletics ==
Logo of the San Francisco State Gators

The university's intercollegiate athletics teams, the Gators, compete in NCAA Division II and are a member of the California Collegiate Athletic Association (wrestling competes in the Rocky Mountain Athletic Conference). SFSU fields 12 sports: men's and women's cross country, men's and women's soccer, women's volleyball, men's and women's basketball, wrestling, indoor track and field, outdoor track and field and softball.

The Gators have also produced 13 National Football League players, including Billy Baird, Elmer Collett, Maury Duncan, Carl Kammerer, Douglas Parrish, and Floyd Peters. Mike Holmgren got his collegiate coaching start as the team's Offensive Coordinator in 1981. The football program ended in 1995.

SF State has produced three Major League Baseball players, two of whom became All-Stars (former Mets shortstop Bud Harrelson, and former Brewers and Red Sox outfielder Tommy Harper). The soccer program has had one player enter the professional ranks. Jared MacLane played in the soccer Professional First Division in Santa Cruz, Bolivia.

The softball team participated in the NCAA Division II National Championships in 2005.

As of 2025, the Gators have earned NCAA team championship at the Division II level, a 1997 wrestling championship.

SF State Wrestling sent a wrestler to a national championship meet every year from 1963–64 to 2016–17.

=== Mascot ===
In the early 20th century, collegiate sports at SFSU became more popular, creating a need for a team name, and the search for a mascot started in 1921. The university's newspaper at the time, the Bay Leaf, asked for suggestions for a mascot. Students suggested an alligator named "Golden Gater" in reference to the Golden Gate. Students voted in favor of the name and the alligator choice was finalized in 1931, but after numerous misspellings by the newspaper, use of "Golden Gator" stuck. In the beginning, two female students were chosen each year as alligator mascots. The mascot's name was shortened to the Gator, and became Alli Gator in 2023.

== Notable faculty and alumni ==
SF State's past and present faculty and alumni include 21 Pulitzer Prize winners, 16 Academy Award winners, 49 Emmy Award winners, 10 Grammy Award winners, 12 Tony Award laureates.

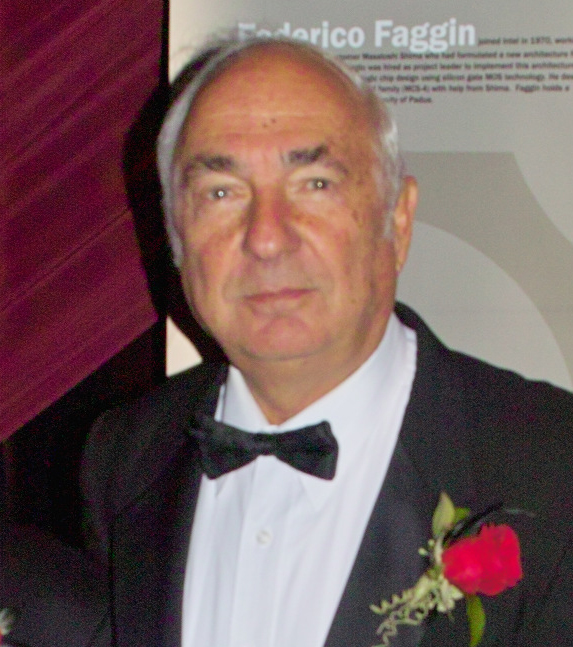
Stanley Mazor, co-inventor of the microprocessor

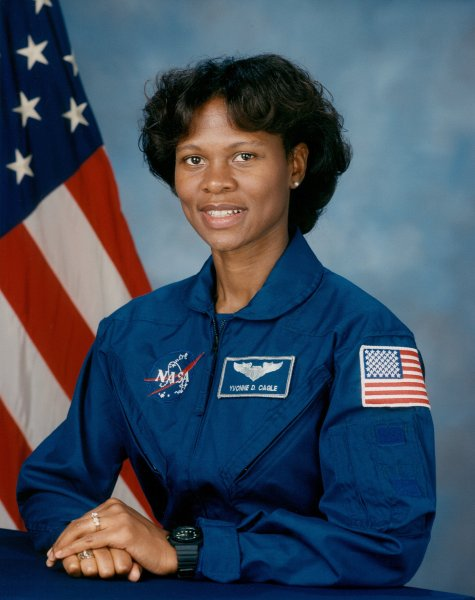
Yvonne Cagle, NASA astronaut

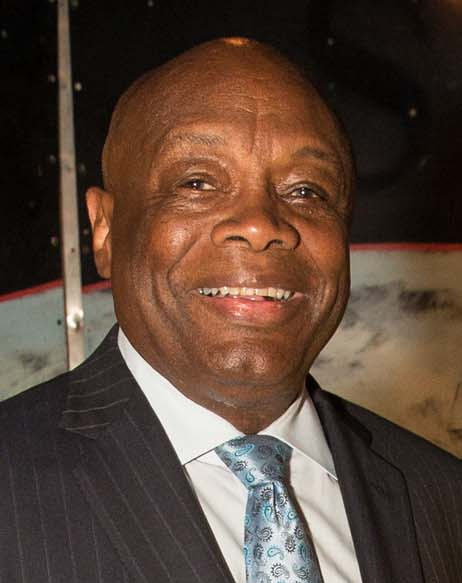
Willie Brown, 41st Mayor of San Francisco

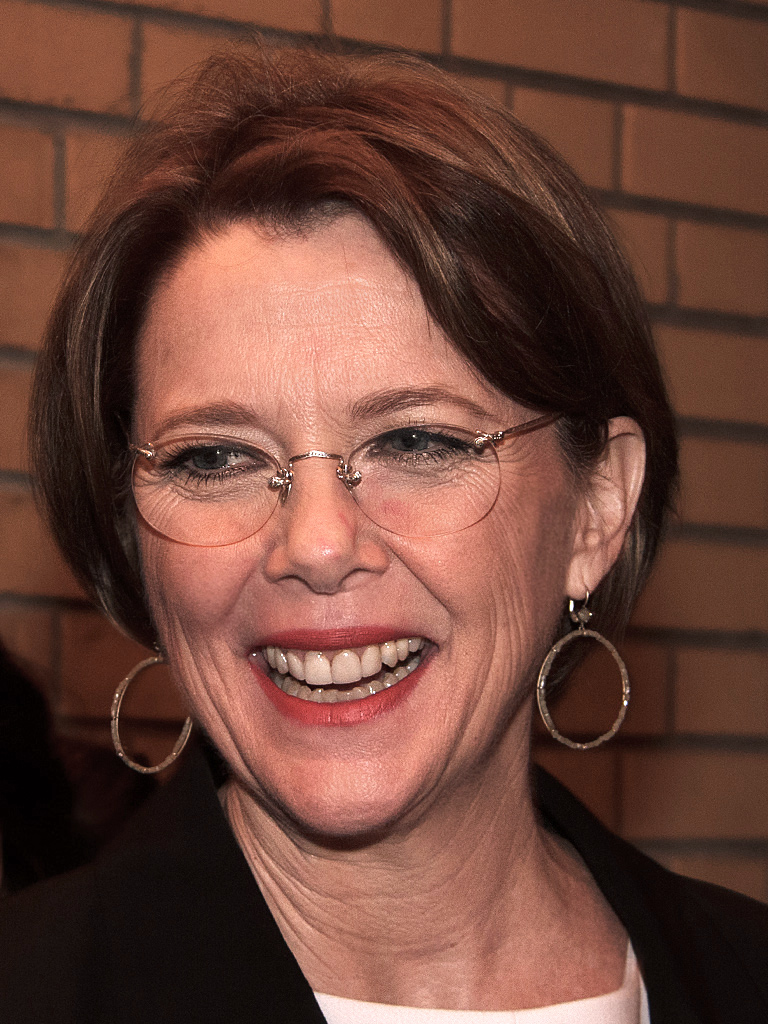
Annette Bening, actress

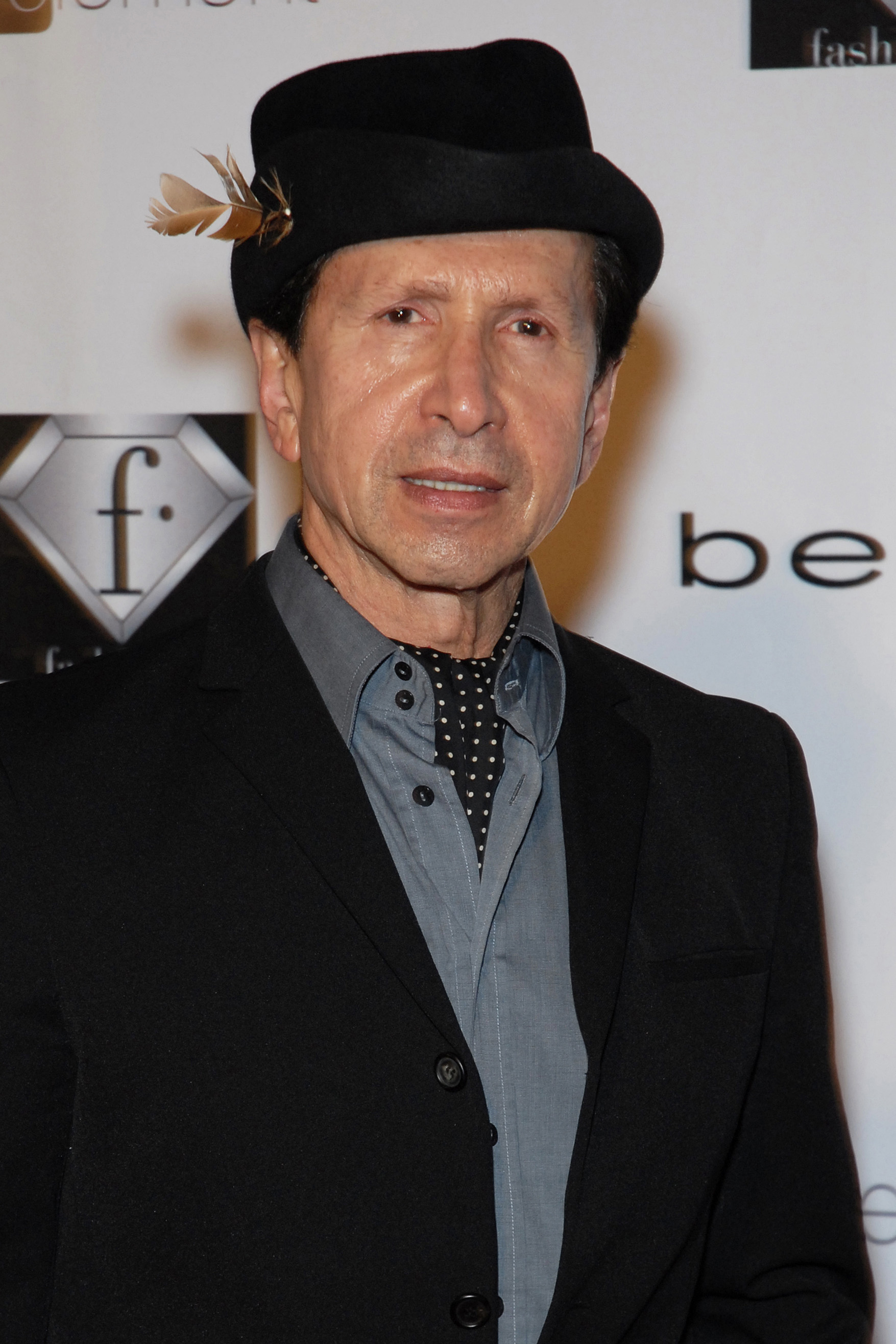
Manny Mashouf, founder, bebe Stores, Inc.

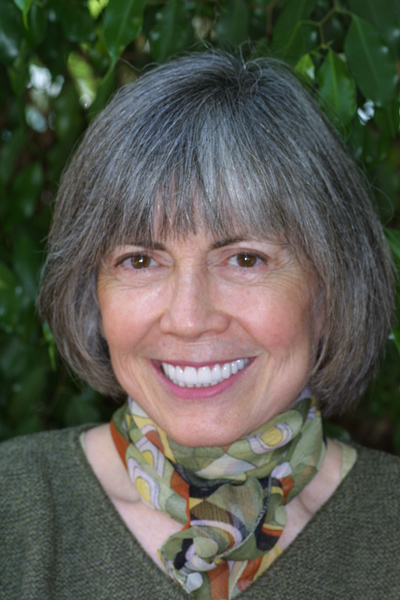
Anne Rice, author of the Vampire Chronicles

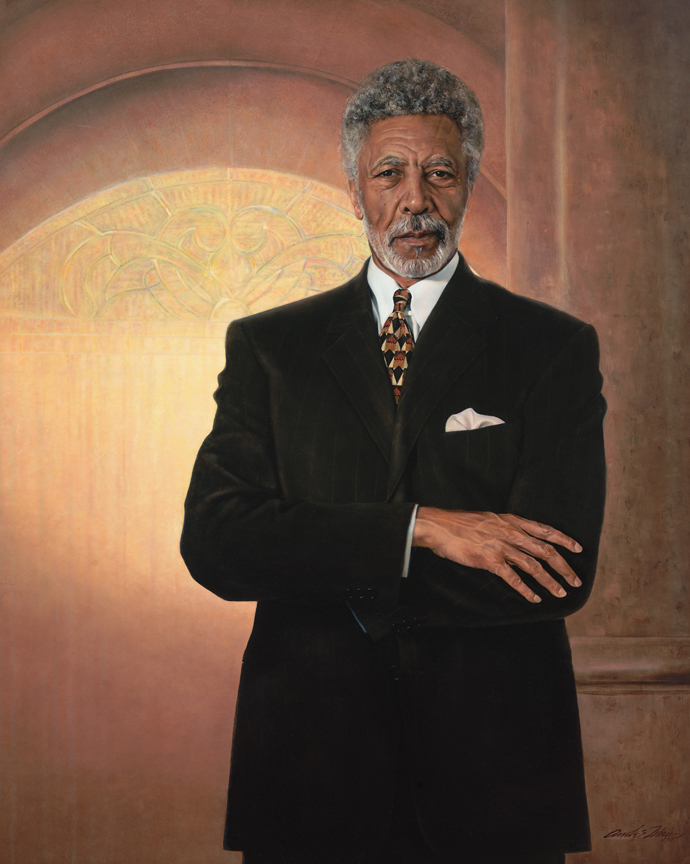
Ron Dellums, 48th Mayor of Oakland

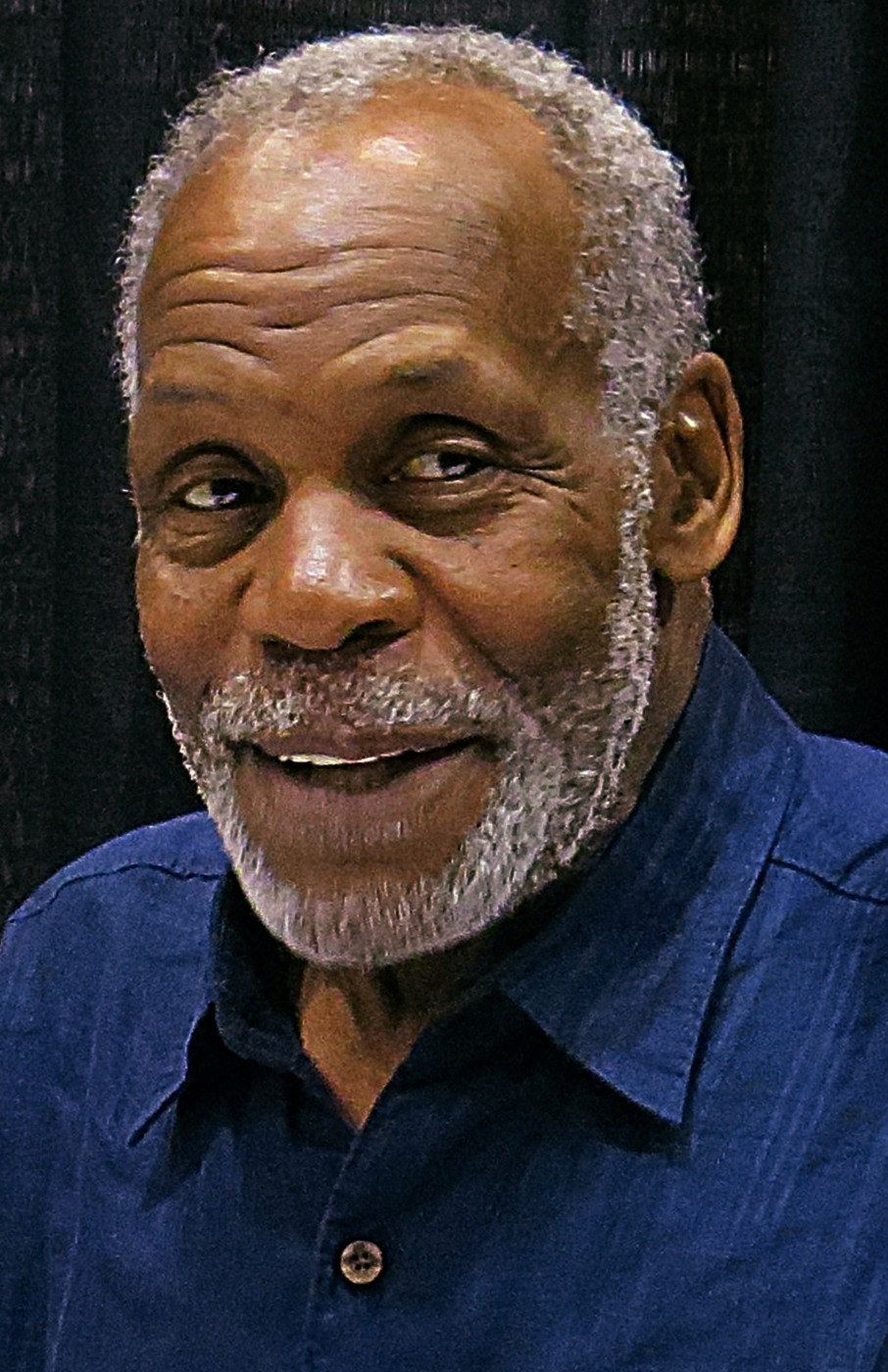
Danny Glover, actor

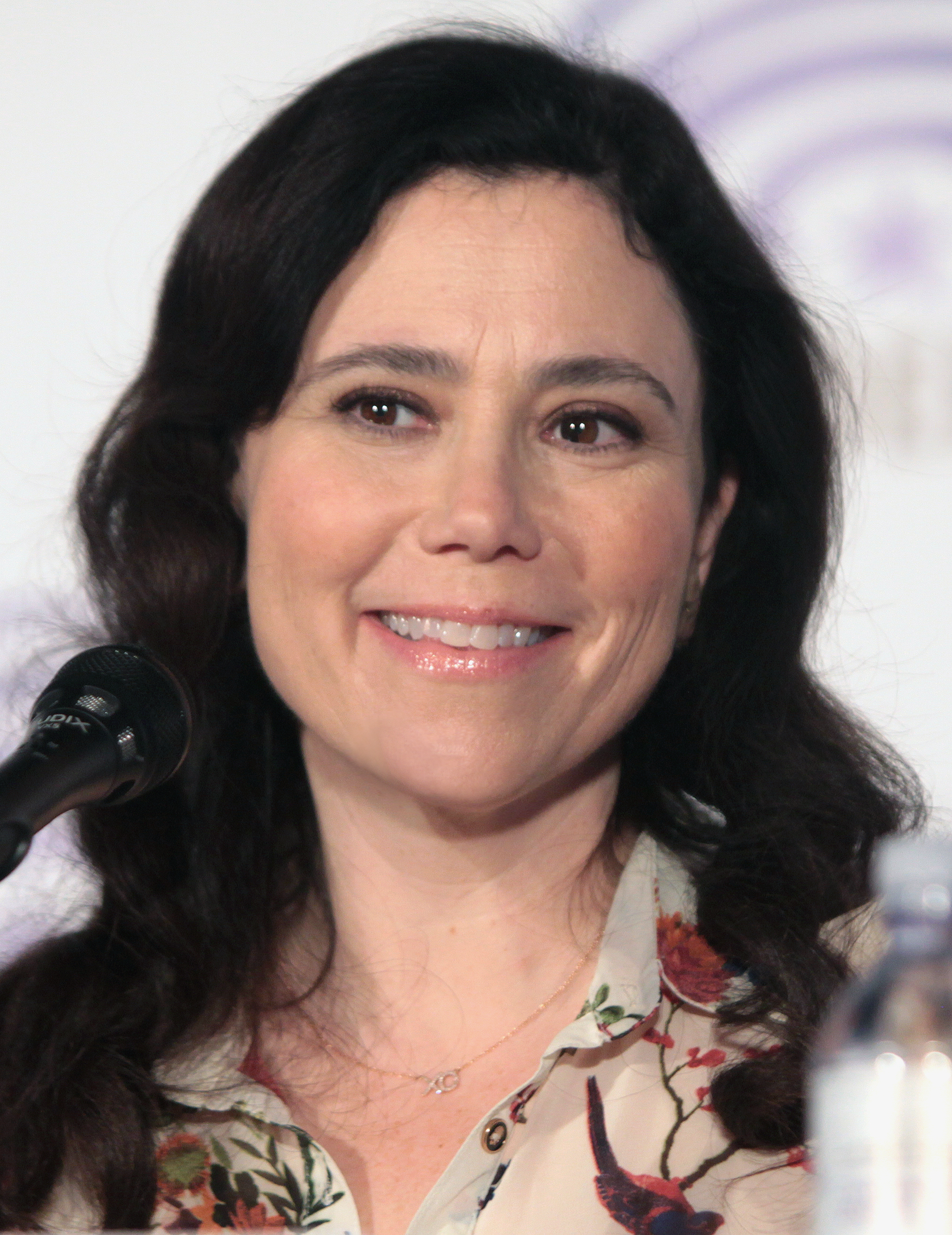
Alex Borstein, actress, voice of Lois on Family Guy

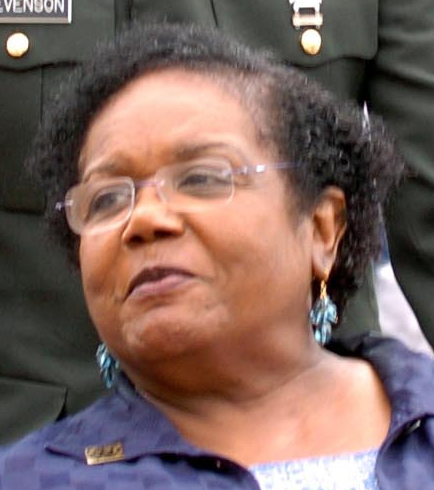
Melba Pattillo Beals, journalist and member of the Little Rock Nine

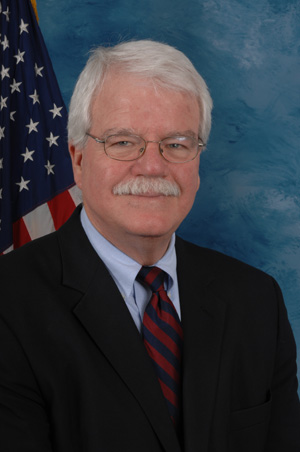
George Miller, U.S. Congressman, 1975–2015

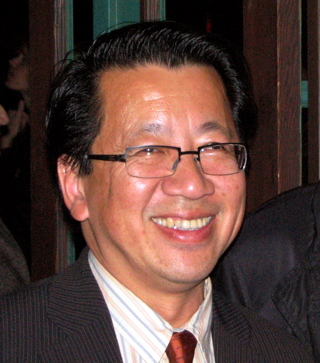
Ben Fong-Torres, journalist for Rolling Stone and the San Francisco Chronicle

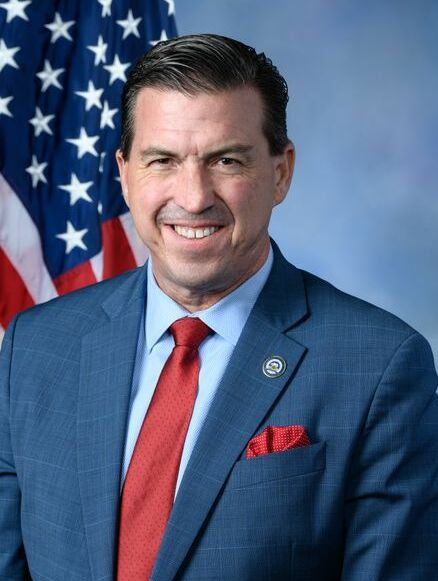
Kevin Mullin, U.S. Congressman, 2022–present

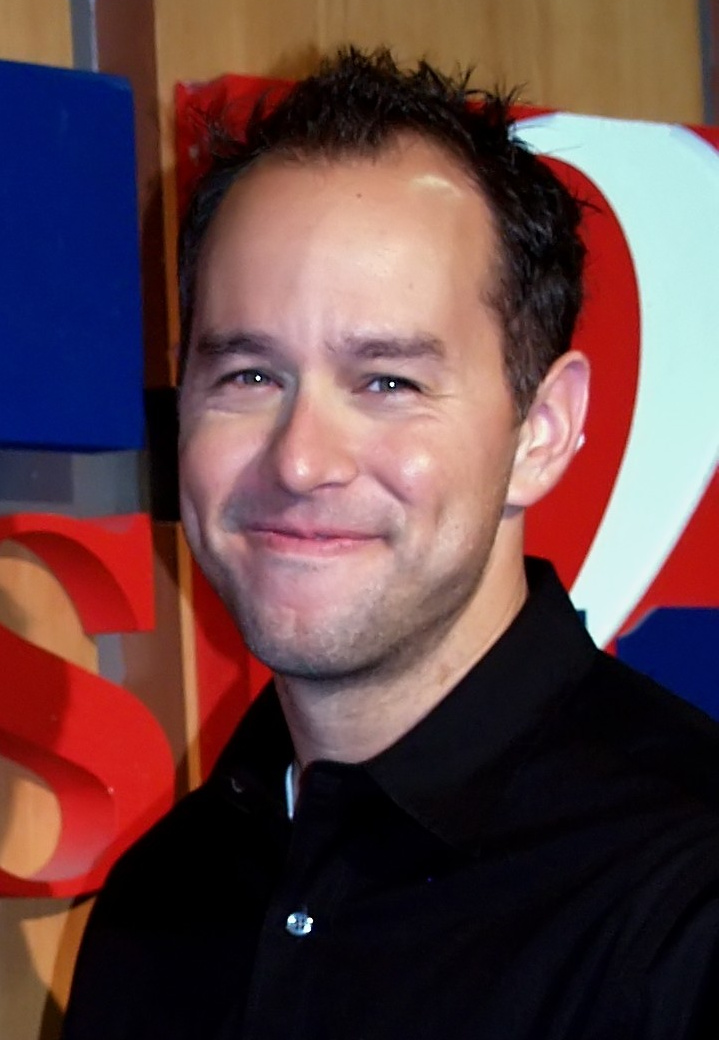
Jonas Rivera, producer, Pixar Animation Studios

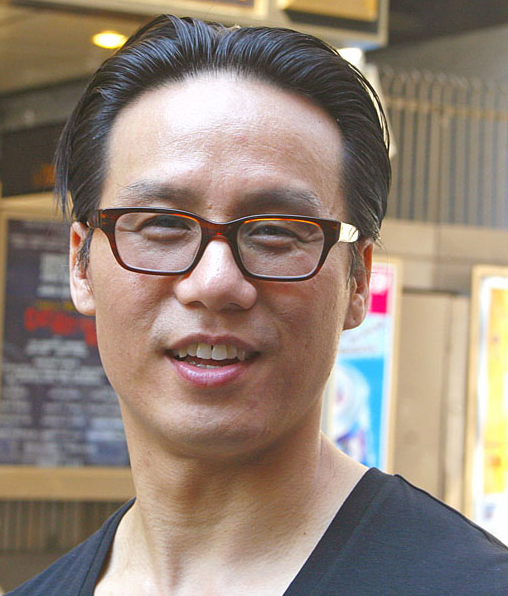
BD Wong, actor

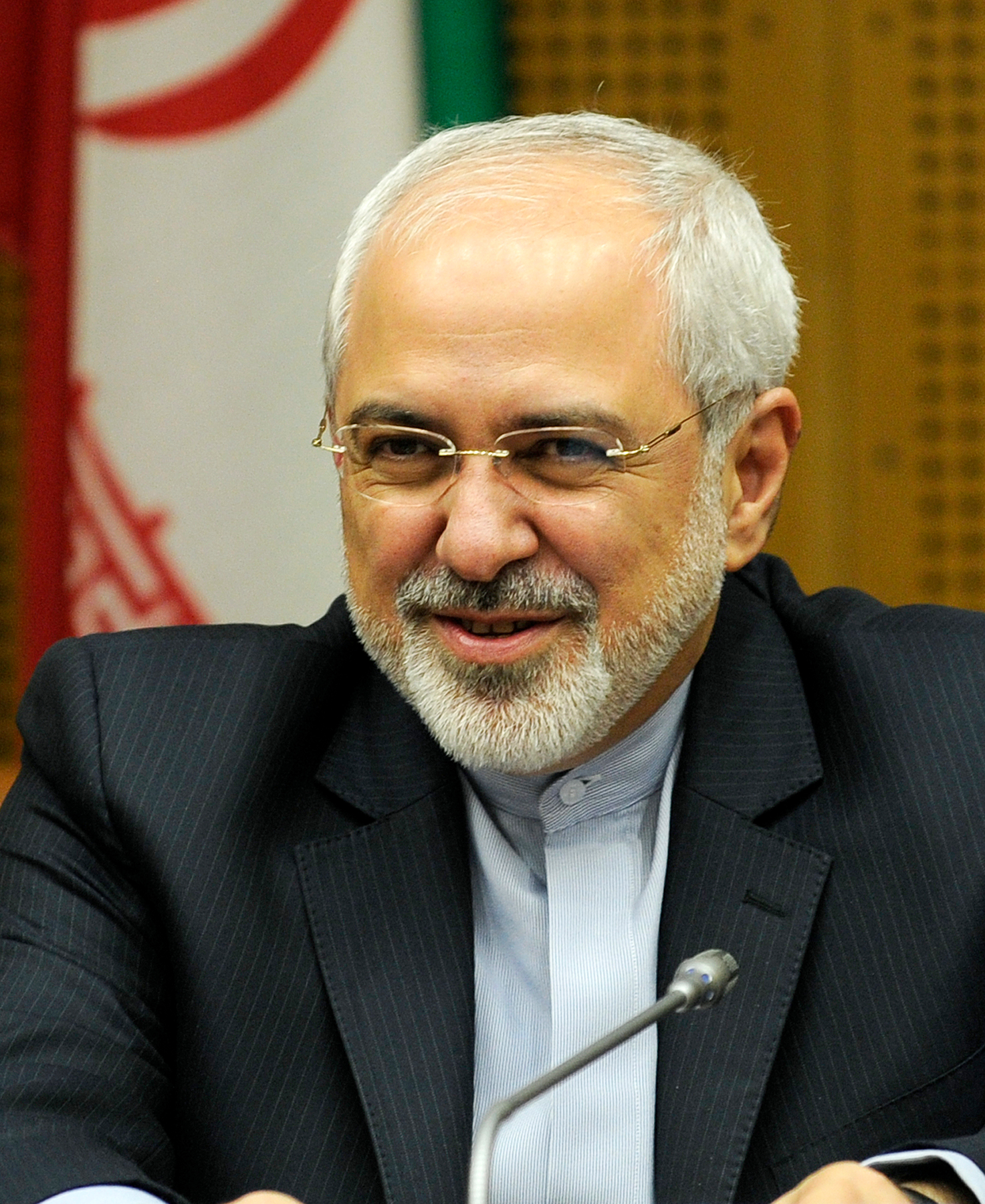
Mohammad Javad Zarif, Former Iranian Minister of Foreign Affairs

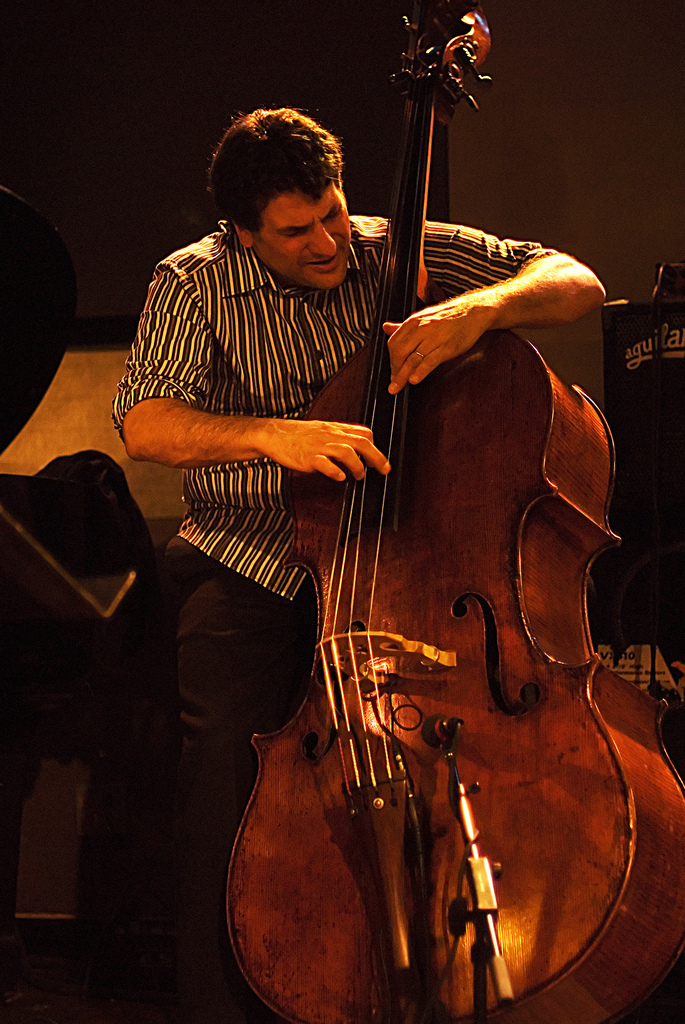
John Patitucci, jazz bassist

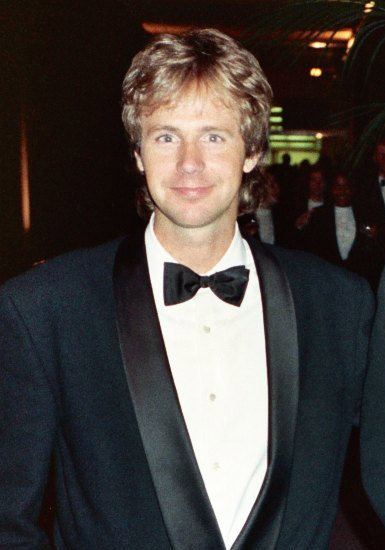
Dana Carvey, comedian and actor

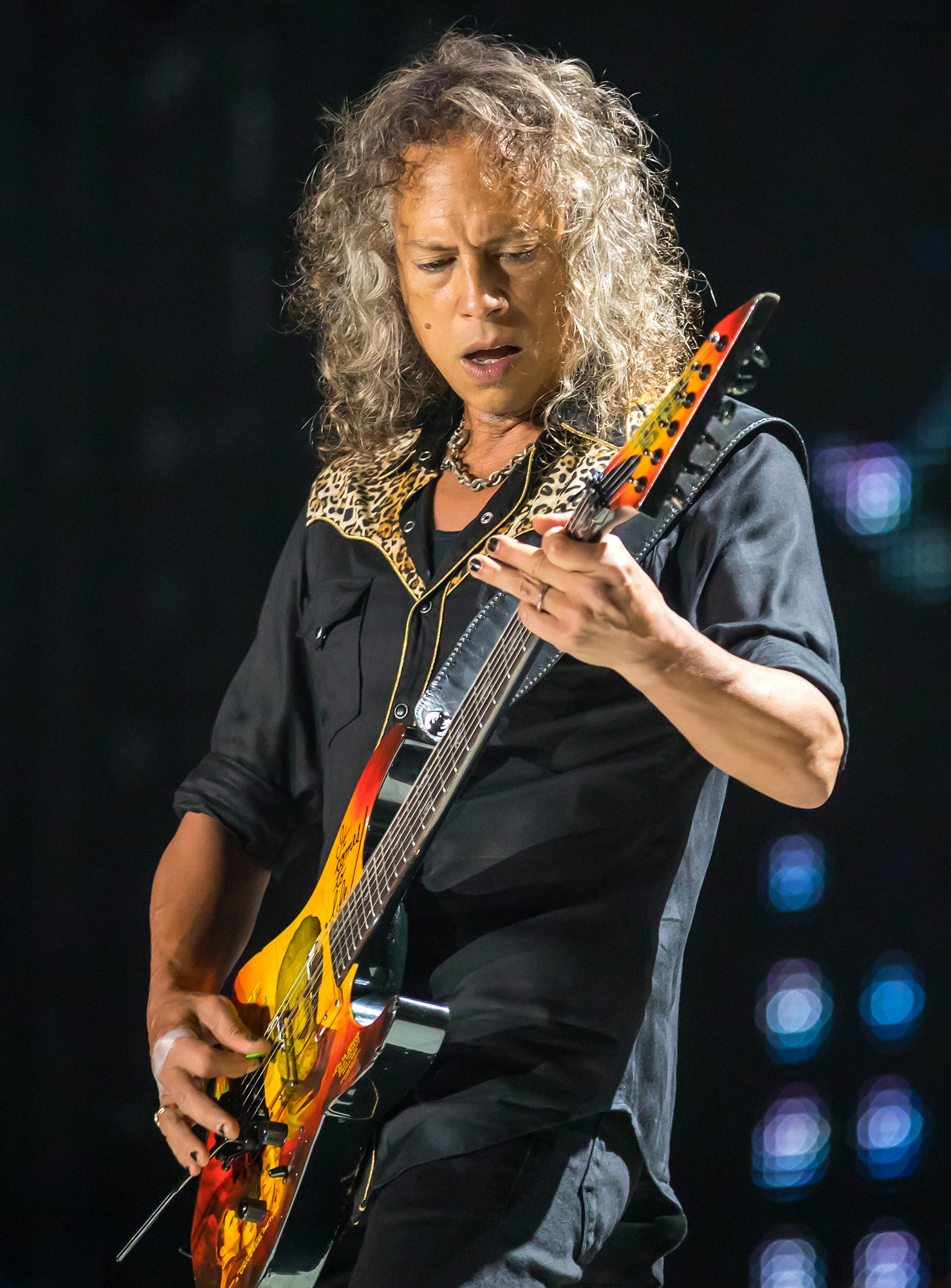
Kirk Hammett, lead guitarist for Metallica

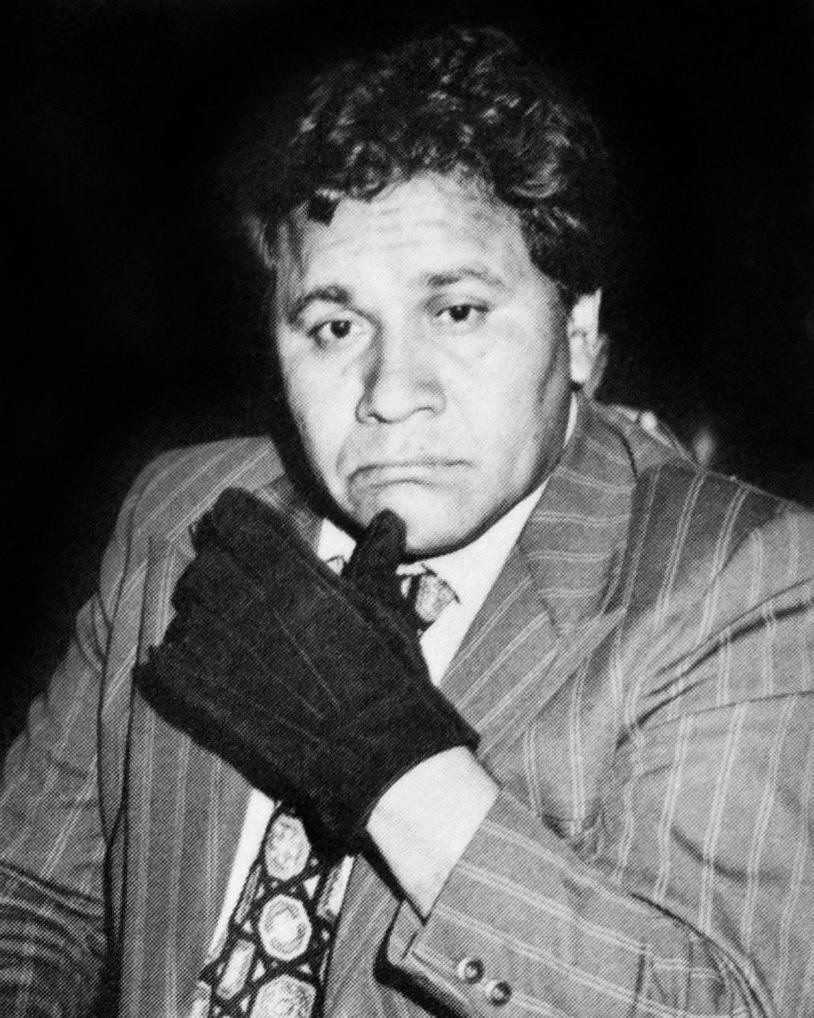
Oscar Zeta Acosta, attorney, politician, novelist and activist

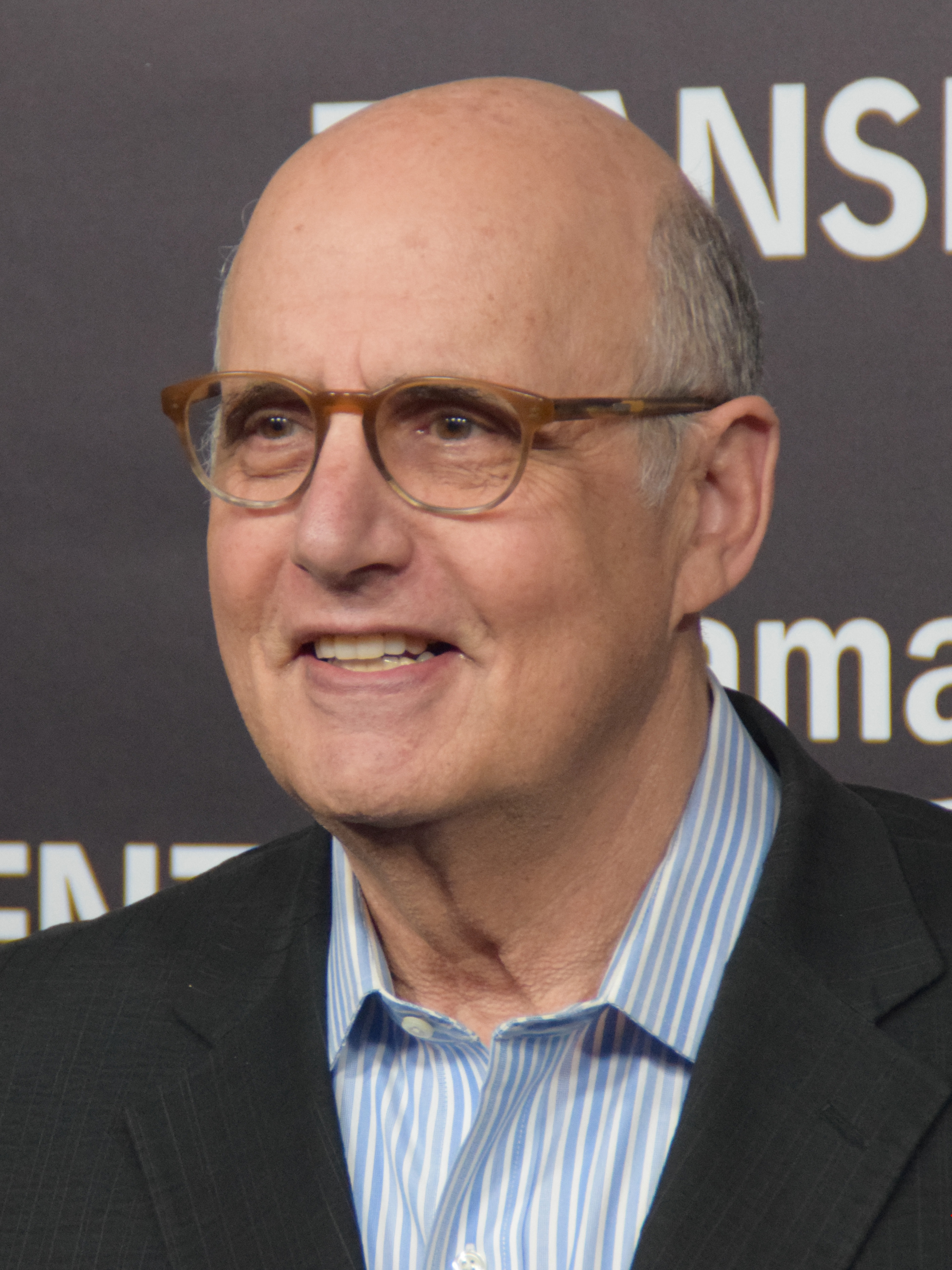
Jeffrey Tambor, actor

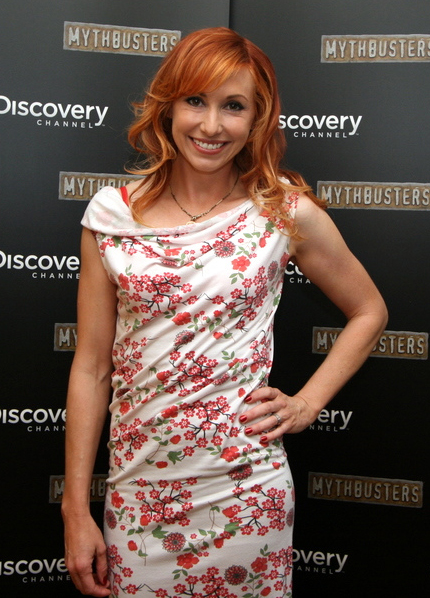
Kari Byron, television host and artist

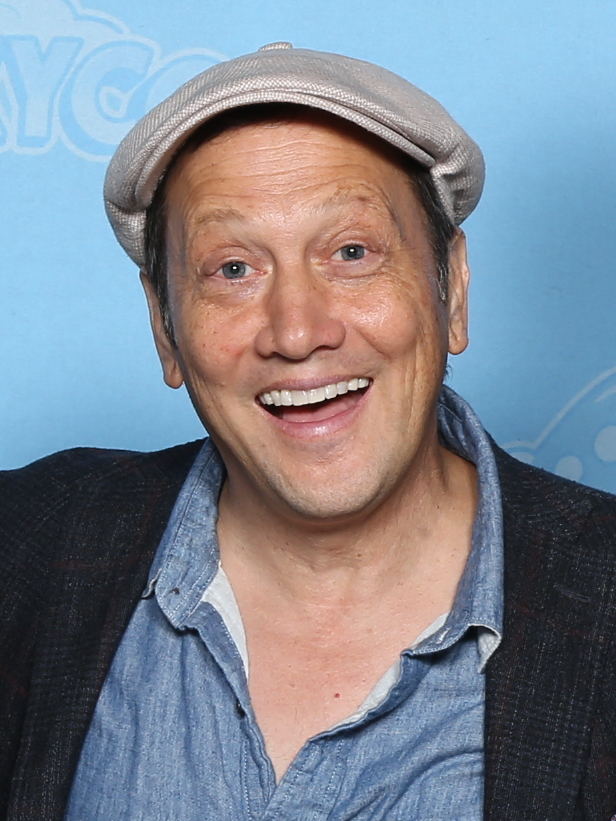
Rob Schneider, actor and comedian

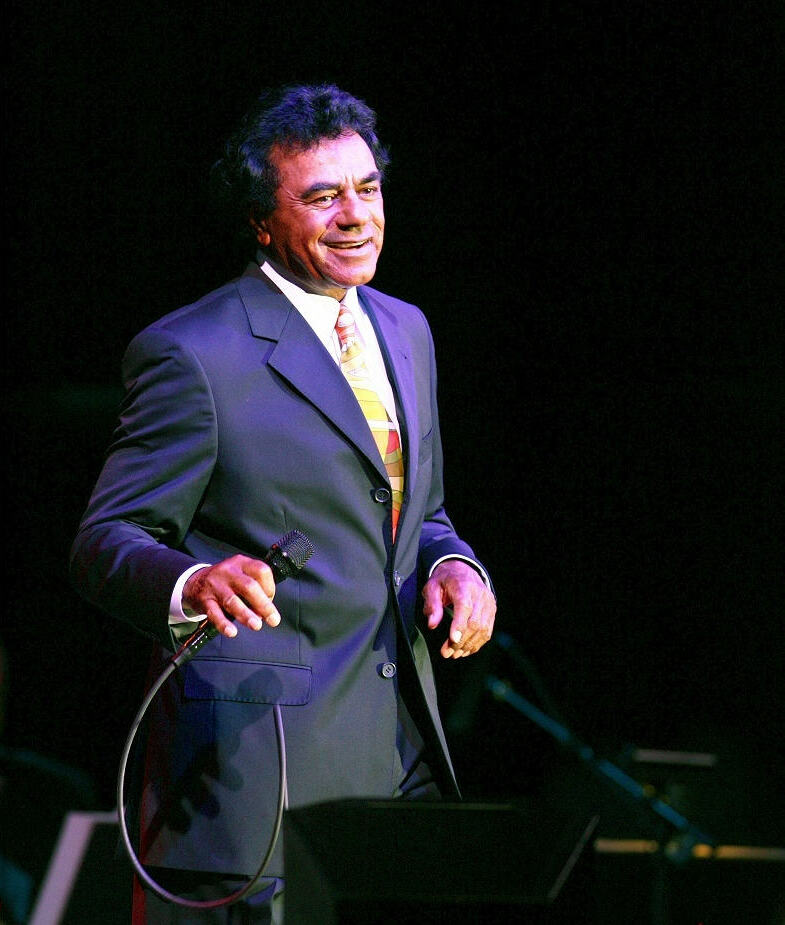
Johnny Mathis, singer

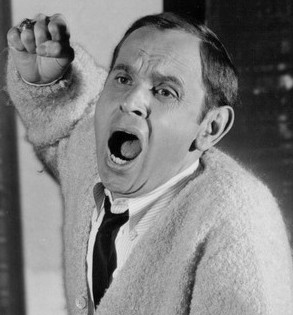
Ronnie Schell, comedian and actor, co-starred as Duke on Gomer Pyle: USMC

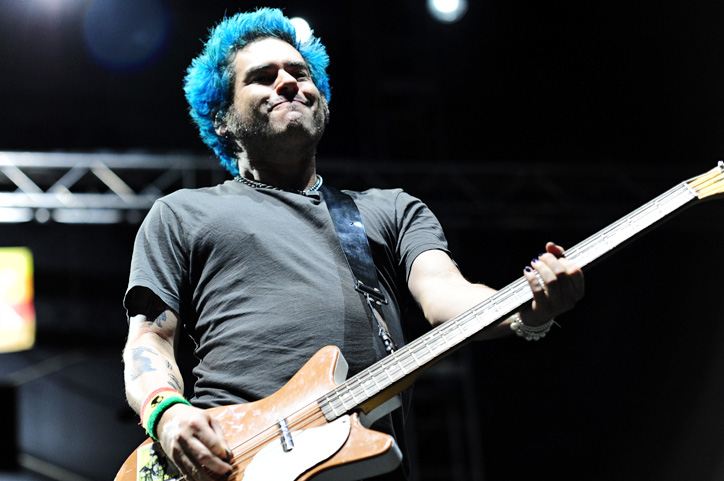
Michael Burkett, a.k.a. Fat Mike, lead vocalist for NOFX

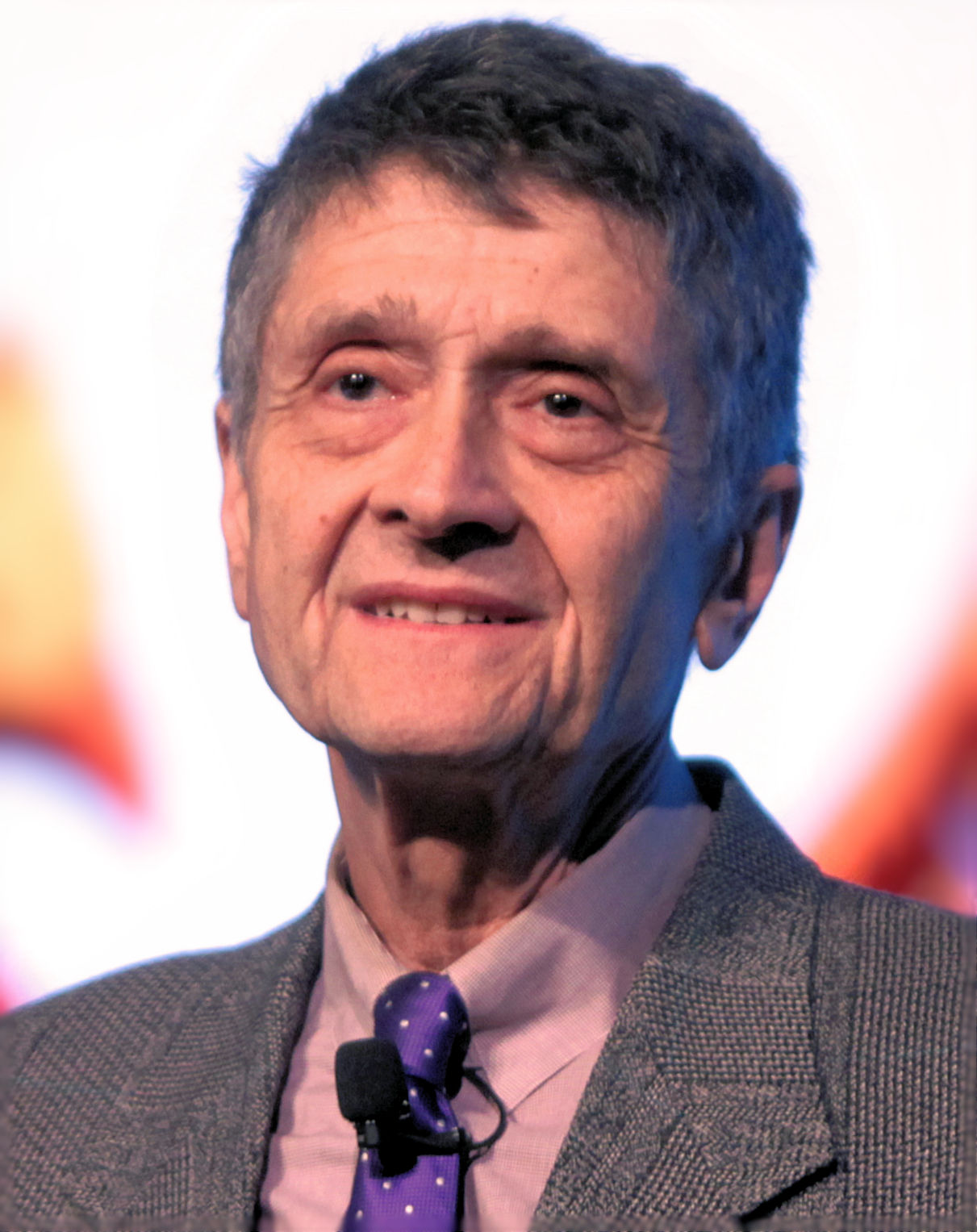
Michael Medved, author and radio talk show host

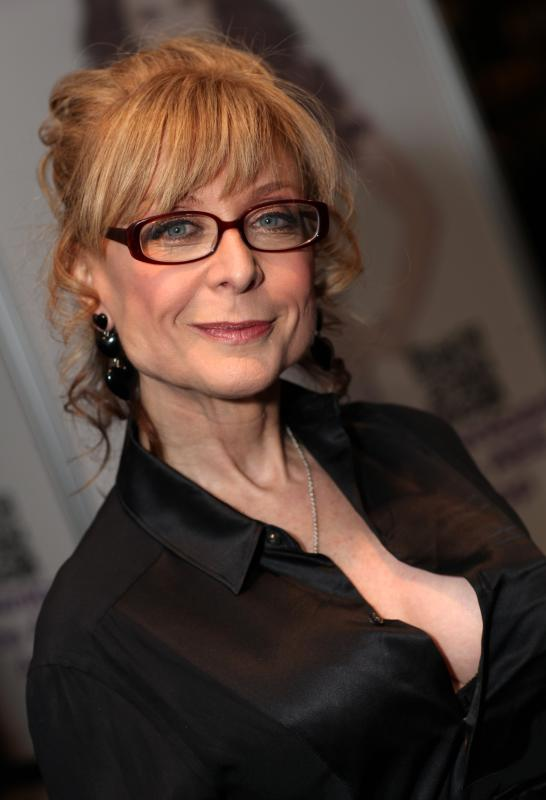
Nina Hartley, pornographic actress, activist and educator

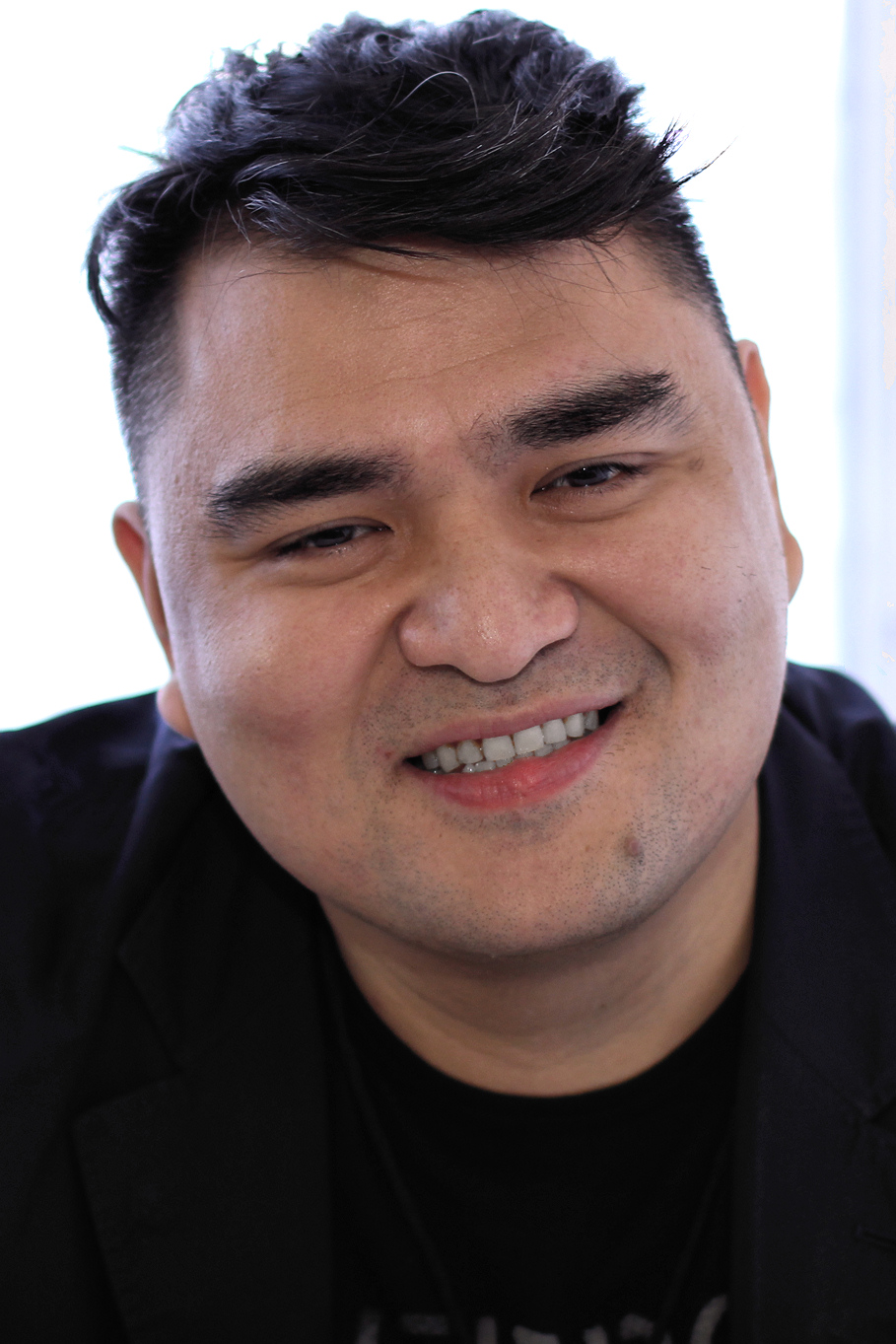
Jose Antonio Vargas, Pulitzer Prize-winning journalist and CSU trustee

== See also ==
- San Francisco Bay National Estuarine Research Reserve, 3,710 acres of land under the university's administration and one of 30 National Estuarine Research Reserves
- Bay Area Television Archive
- DOC Film Institute
- FogCam, longest-running webcam in the world that started as a student project but is now under university ownership
