= California State University =

Public university system

Coordinates: 33°45′50″N 118°12′4″W

- Motto: Vox Veritas Vita (Latin)
- Motto in English: "Voice, Truth, Life" (Speak the truth as a way of life.)
- Type: Public university system
- Established: 1857; 169 years ago
- Affiliations: State of California
- Endowment: $2.8 billion (2023–24)
- Budget: $8.4 billion (2023–24)
- Chancellor: Mildred García
- Undergraduates: 408,248 (2023–24)
- Postgraduates: 53,364 (2023–24)
- Location: Long Beach, California, United States
- Campus: 22 campuses
- Colors: Red & White
- Website: calstate.edu

The California State University (Cal State or CSU) is California's system of public universities. Headquartered in Long Beach, the system includes 22 campuses and seven off-campus centers, and serves more than 460,000 students. Under the California Master Plan for Higher Education, the California State University is a part of the state's three-tier system public postsecondary education plan, which also includes the California Community Colleges and University of California systems.

Established in 1960, the CSU system traces its history to the California State Normal Schools, which were chartered beginning in 1857. The system is governed by a 25-member Board of Trustees, which appoints the Chancellor as the system's chief executive officer. The system employs 63,375 faculty and staff members.

The CSU is the largest public university system in the United States and awards the most bachelor's degrees of any public university system in the country. Since 1961, more than four million people have received degrees from the CSU system. It offers more than 1,800 degree programs in about 240 subject areas.

== History ==
=== State Normal Schools ===
San José State University, founded in 1862 as the California State Normal School, is the oldest campus of the CSU system.

The California State University system traces its history to the Minns Evening Normal School, founded in 1857 by George W. Minns in San Francisco. The school was a normal school, an institution for training teachers, and the first of its kind in California.

The school was taken over by the state in 1862 and moved to San Jose. Renamed the California State Normal School, it eventually evolved into San Jose State University. A southern branch of the California State Normal School was established in Los Angeles in 1882. In 1887, the California State Legislature dropped the word California from the names of the San Jose and Los Angeles schools, renaming them State Normal Schools.

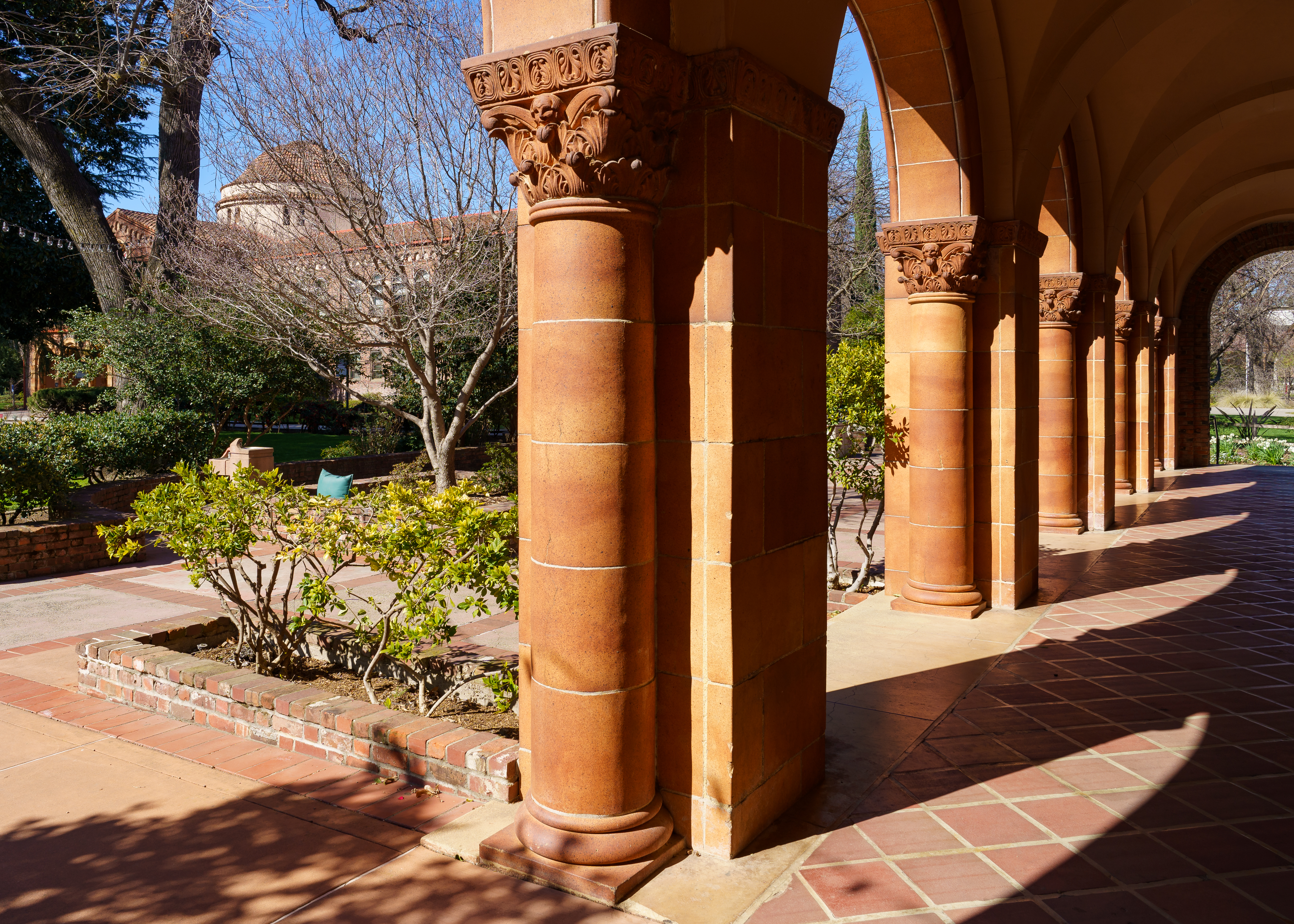
California State University, Chico was founded in 1887 as the Northern Branch of the State Normal School.

Other state normal schools were founded at Chico (1887) and San Diego (1897). However, at this time they did not form a university system in the modern sense, as each normal school had its own board of trustees and was governed independently.

In 1919, the State Normal School at Los Angeles became the Southern Branch of the University of California; in 1927, it was renamed the University of California at Los Angeles.

=== State Teachers Colleges ===
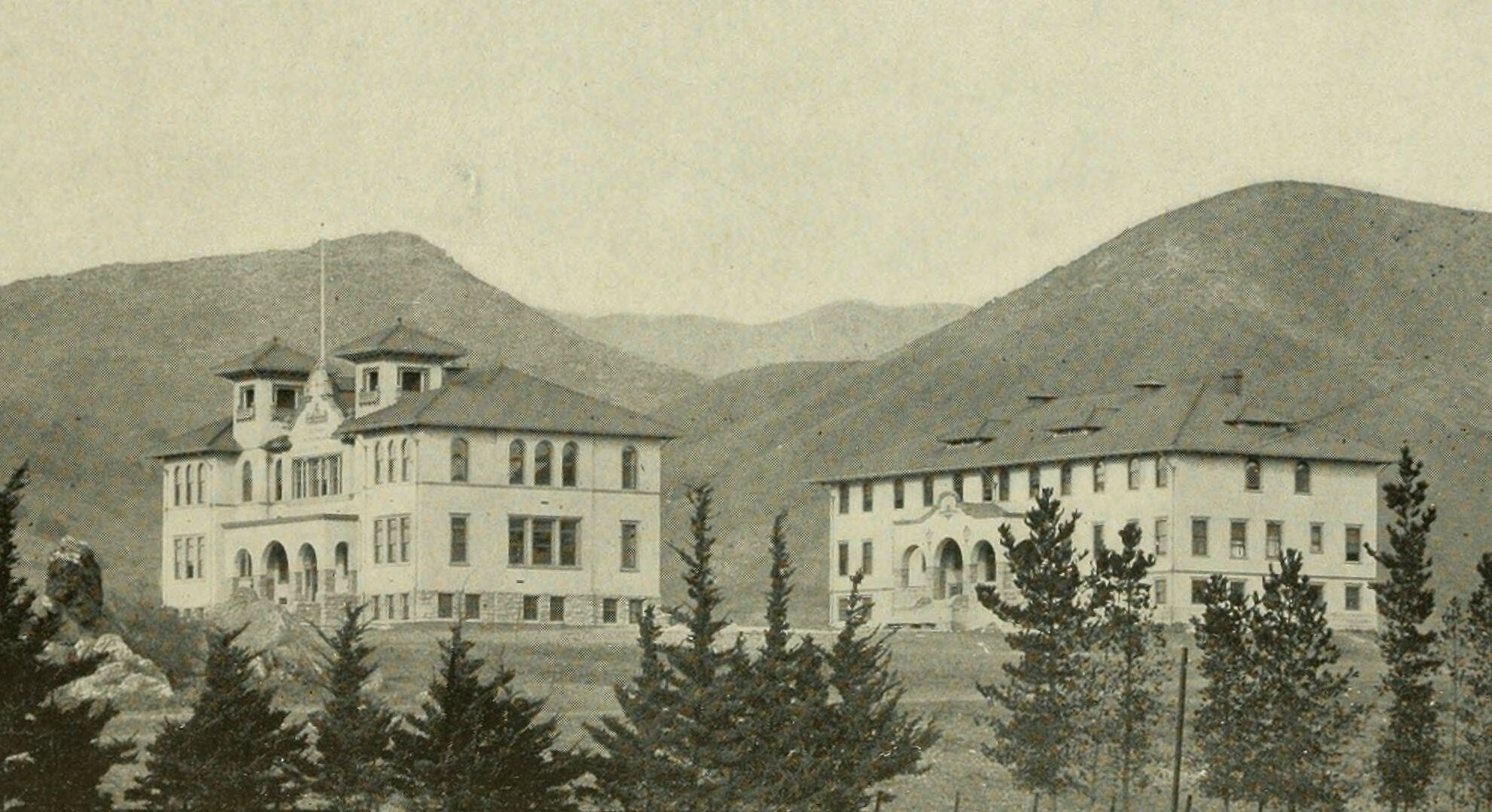
The California Polytechnic School, established in 1901, eventually became today's California Polytechnic State University, San Luis Obispo.

In May 1921, the legislature enacted a reform package for the state's educational system, which went into effect that July. The State Normal Schools were renamed State Teachers Colleges, their boards of trustees were dissolved, and they were placed under the supervision of the Division of Normal and Special Schools within the new California Department of Education. The colleges were managed from Sacramento by the deputy director of the division, who was subordinate to the State Superintendent of Public Instruction, the head of the Department of Education, and the State Board of Education.

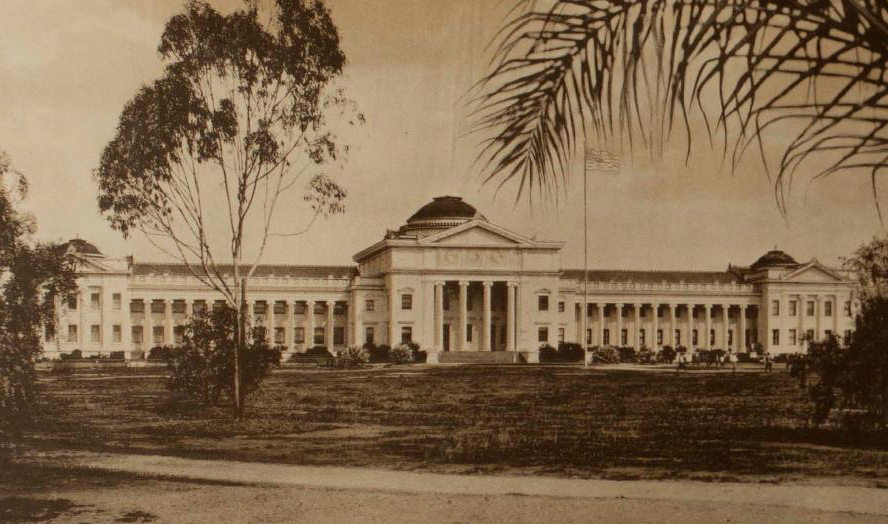
San Diego State Normal School, founded in 1897, became San Diego State Teachers College in 1923 and eventually San Diego State University.

From 1921 to 1960, the State Teachers Colleges operated under a combination of centralized financial control, but with limited supervision over the presidents of the colleges, giving them substantial autonomy in day-to-day operations. According to Clark Kerr, J. Paul Leonard, president of San Francisco State from 1945 to 1957, once described his position as "the best college presidency in the United States—no organized faculty, no organized student body, no organized alumni association, and...no board of trustees." At the same time, state law treated the colleges as state government agencies, subjecting their budgets to the same financial controls as other state agencies, unlike the independent University of California.

During the 1920s and 1930s, the institutions evolved from normal schools, that is, vocational schools narrowly focused on training elementary school teachers to impart basic literacy to young children, into teachers colleges that provided a full liberal arts education and whose graduates were fully qualified to teach all K–12 grades. Charles McLane, the first president of the Fresno State Normal School (now California State University, Fresno), was a major advocate for the transition to a broad liberal arts education for K–12 teachers. McLane had founded Fresno Junior College (now Fresno City College) in 1907. When he founded the Fresno State Normal School in 1911, McLane arranged for it to co-locate with the junior college and synchronize schedules so teachers in training could take liberal arts courses there. San Diego and San Jose also subsequently expanded their academic programs beyond traditional teacher training. These developments had the "tacit approval" of the State Board of Education and the State Superintendent of Public Instruction, but they lacked express authorization from the board and the state legislature.

=== State Colleges ===
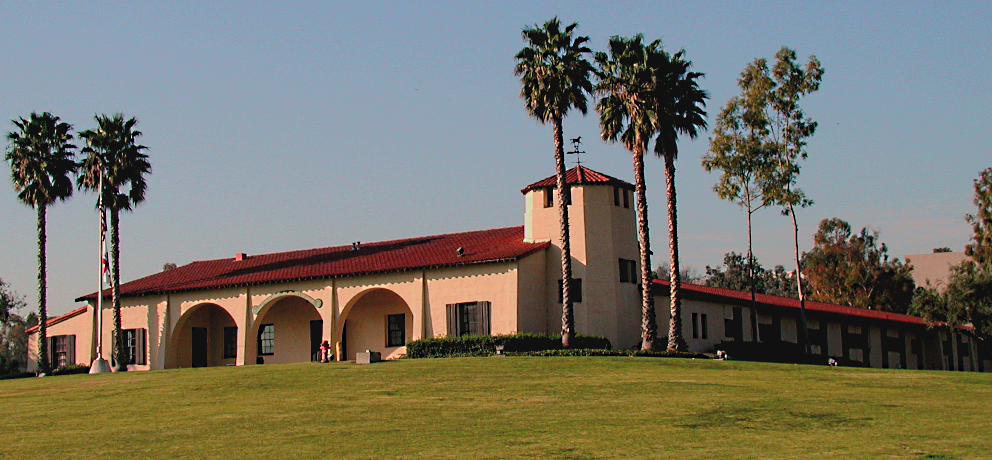
Founded in 1938, the southern campus of the California State Polytechnic School became the independent California State Polytechnic University, Pomona in 1966.

In 1932, the Carnegie Foundation for the Advancement of Teaching was asked by the state legislature and governor to perform a study of California higher education. The so-called "Suzzallo Report" (after the Foundation's president, Henry Suzzallo) sharply criticized the State Teachers Colleges for their intrusion upon UC's liberal arts prerogative and recommended their transfer to the Regents of the University of California (who would be expected to put them back in their proper place). This recommendation spectacularly backfired when the faculties and administrations of the State Teachers Colleges rallied to protect their independence from the Regents. In 1935, the State Teachers Colleges were formally upgraded by the state legislature to State Colleges and were expressly authorized to offer a full four-year liberal arts curriculum, culminating in bachelor's degrees, but they remained under the Department of Education.

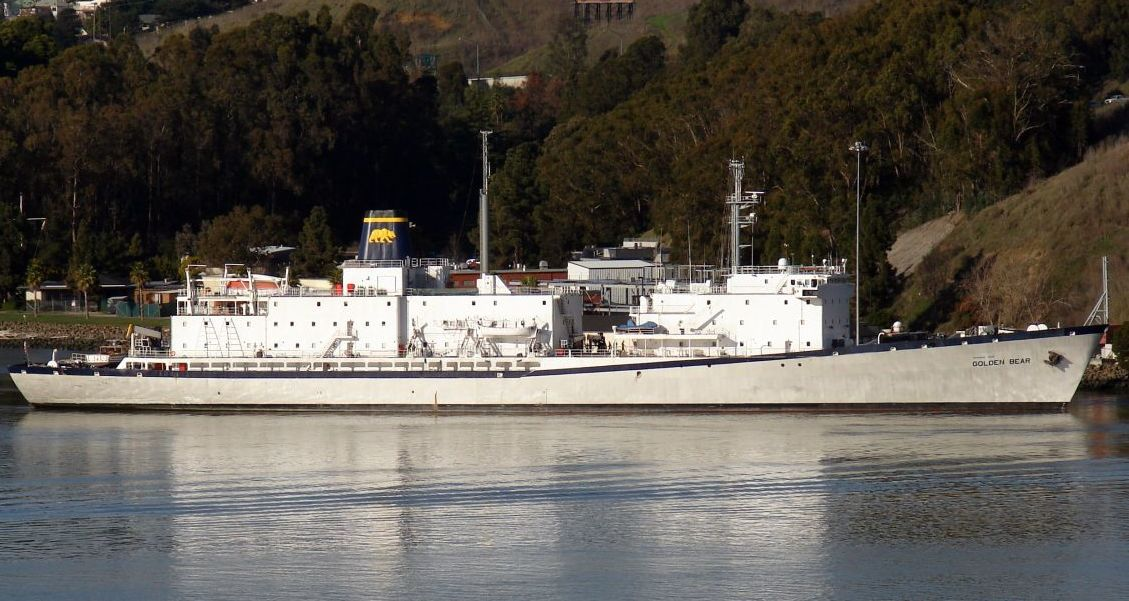
The Cal Poly Maritime Academy was founded in 1929 as the California Nautical School.

During World War II, a group of local Santa Barbara leaders and business promoters (with the acquiescence of college administrators) were able to convince the state legislature and governor to transfer Santa Barbara State College to the University of California in 1944. After losing a second campus to UC, the state colleges' supporters arranged for the California state constitution to be amended in 1946 to prevent it from happening again. The period after World War II brought a great expansion in the number of state colleges. Additional state colleges were established in Los Angeles, Sacramento, and Long Beach from 1947 to 1949, and then seven more state colleges were authorized to be established between 1957 and 1960. Six more state colleges were founded after the enactment of the Donahoe Higher Education Act of 1960, bringing the total number to 23.

=== California State Colleges ===
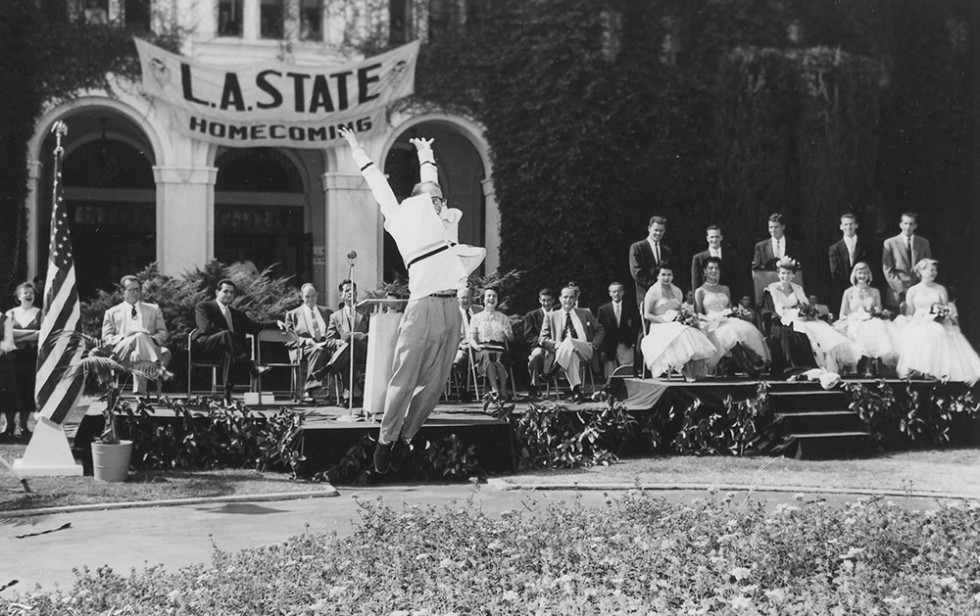
California State University, Los Angeles was founded in 1947.

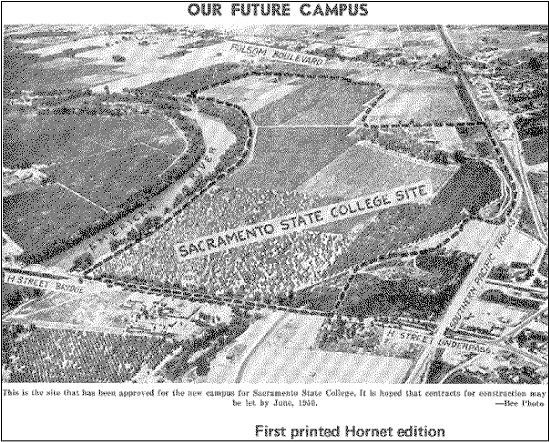
Aerial view of the future campus of California State University, Sacramento, founded in 1947.

During the 1950s, the state colleges' peculiar mix of fiscal centralization and operational decentralization began to look rather incongruous in comparison to the highly centralized University of California (then on the brink of its own decentralization project) and the highly decentralized local school districts around the state which operated K–12 schools and junior colleges—all of which enjoyed much more autonomy from the rest of the state government than the state colleges. In particular, several of the state college presidents had come to strongly dislike the State Board of Education and State Superintendent of Public Instruction Roy E. Simpson, whom the presidents felt were too deferential to the University of California. Five state college presidents led the movement in the late 1950s for more autonomy from the state government: Glenn Dumke at San Francisco State (who had succeeded Leonard in 1957), Arnold Joyal at Fresno State, John T. Wahlquist at San Jose State, Julian A. McPhee at Cal Poly San Luis Obispo, and Malcolm Love at San Diego State. They had three main objectives: (1) a systemwide board independent of the rest of the state government; (2) the right to award professional degrees in engineering and the doctorate in the field of education; and (3) state funding for research at the state college level.

The state legislature was limited to merely suggesting locations to the UC Board of Regents for the planned UC campus on the Central Coast. In contrast, because the state colleges lacked autonomy, they were vulnerable to pork barrel politics in the state legislature. As early as 1932, the Suzzallo Report had noted that "the establishing of State teachers colleges has been partly the product of geographic-political considerations rather than of thoughtful determination of needs". In 1959 alone, state legislators introduced separate bills to individually create nineteen state colleges. Two years earlier, one bill that had actually passed had resulted in the creation of a new state college in Turlock, a town better known for its turkeys than its aspirations towards higher education, and which made no sense except that the chair of the Senate Committee on Education happened to be from Turlock.

In April 1960, the California Master Plan for Higher Education and the resulting Donahoe Higher Education Act finally granted autonomy to the state colleges. The Donahoe Act merged all the state colleges into the State College System of California, severed them from the Department of Education (and also the State Board of Education and the State Superintendent of Public Instruction), and authorized the appointment of a systemwide board of trustees and a systemwide chancellor. The board was initially known as the "Trustees of the State College System of California"; the word "board" was not part of the official name. In March 1961, the state legislature renamed the system to the California State Colleges (CSC) and the board became the "Trustees of the California State Colleges."

As enacted, the Donahoe Act provides that UC "shall be the primary state-supported academic agency for research" and "has the sole authority in public higher education to award the doctoral degree in all fields of learning". In contrast, CSU may only award the doctoral degree as part of a joint program with UC or "independent institutions of higher education" and is authorized to conduct research "in support of" its mission, which is to provide "undergraduate and graduate instruction through the master's degree." This language reflects the intent of UC President Kerr and his allies to bring order to "a state of anarchy"—in particular, the state colleges' repeated attempts (whenever they thought UC was not looking) to quietly blossom into full-fledged research universities, as was occurring elsewhere with other state colleges like Michigan State.

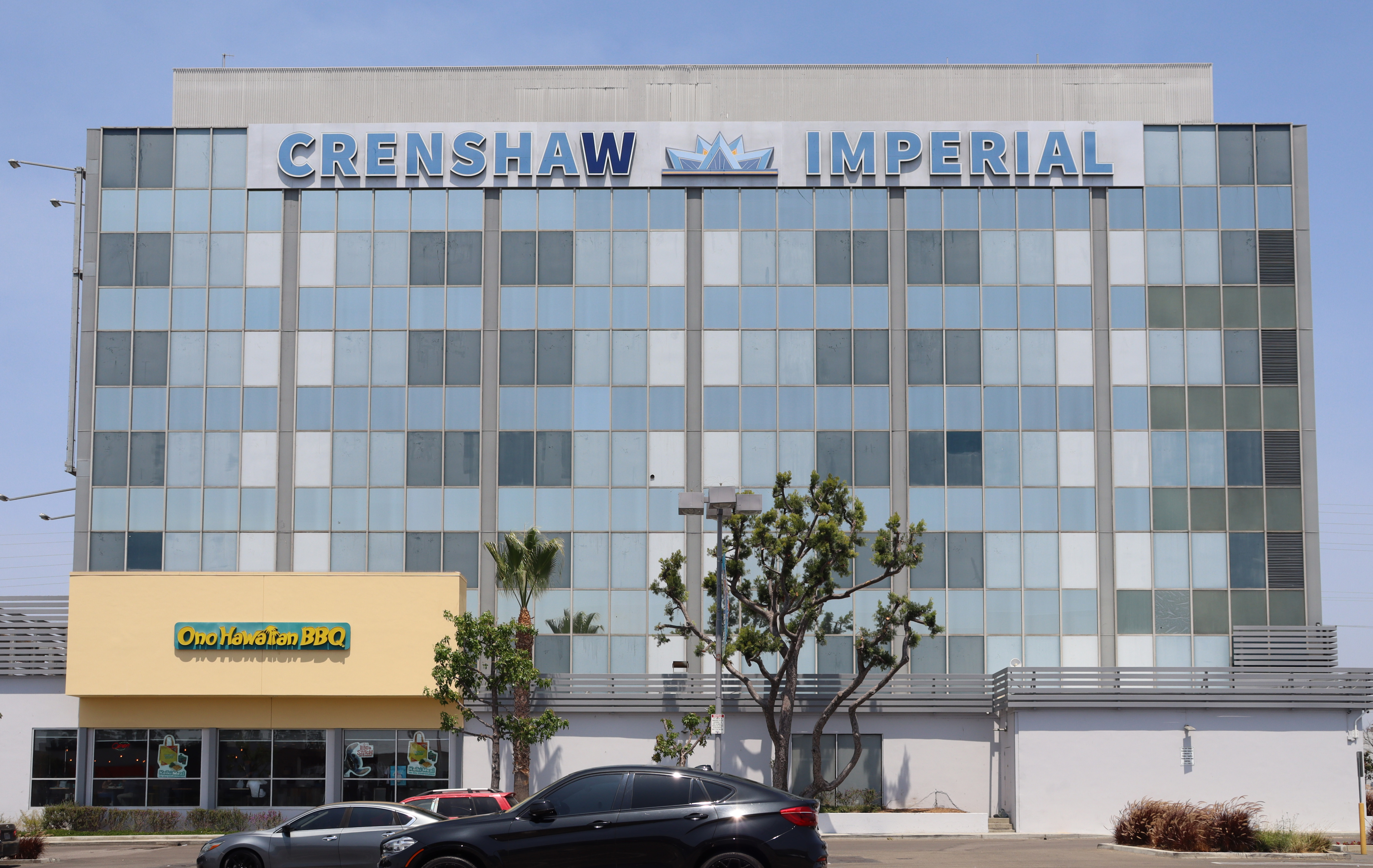
The Inglewood office building which was home to the so-called "imperial headquarters" of the California State Colleges from 1961 to 1965 (photographed 2025).

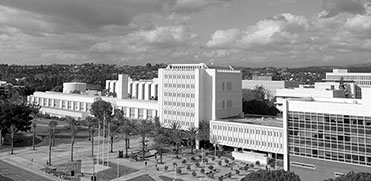
California State University, Fullerton was established in 1957.

Kerr explained in his memoirs: "The state did not need a higher education system where every component was intent on being another Harvard or Berkeley or Stanford." As he saw it, the problem with such "academic drift" was that state resources would be spread too thin across too many universities, all would be too busy chasing the "holy grail of elite research status" (in that state college faculty members would inevitably demand reduced teaching loads to make time for research) for any of them to fulfill the state colleges' traditional role of training teachers, and then "some new colleges would have to be founded" to take up that role. At the time, California already had too many research universities; it had only 9 percent of the American population but 15 percent of the research universities (12 out of 80). The language about joint programs and authorizing the state colleges to conduct some research was offered by Kerr at the last minute on December 18, 1959, as a "sweetener" to secure the consent of a then-wavering Dumke, the state colleges' representative on the Master Plan survey team.

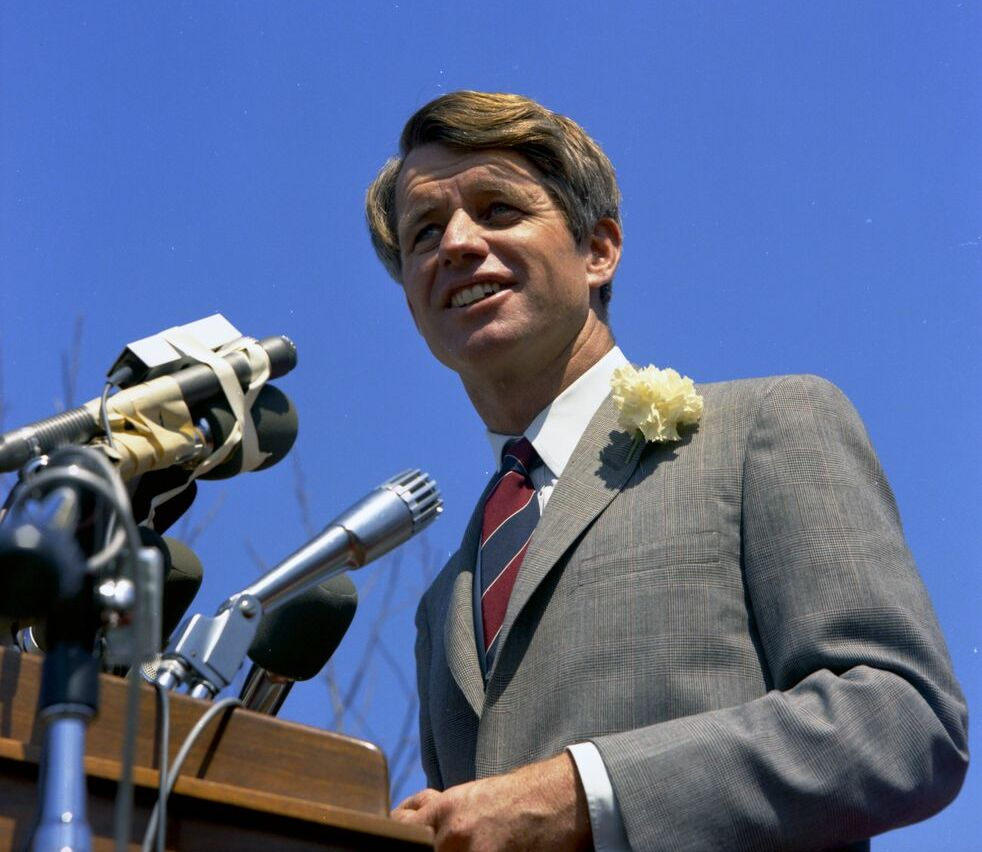
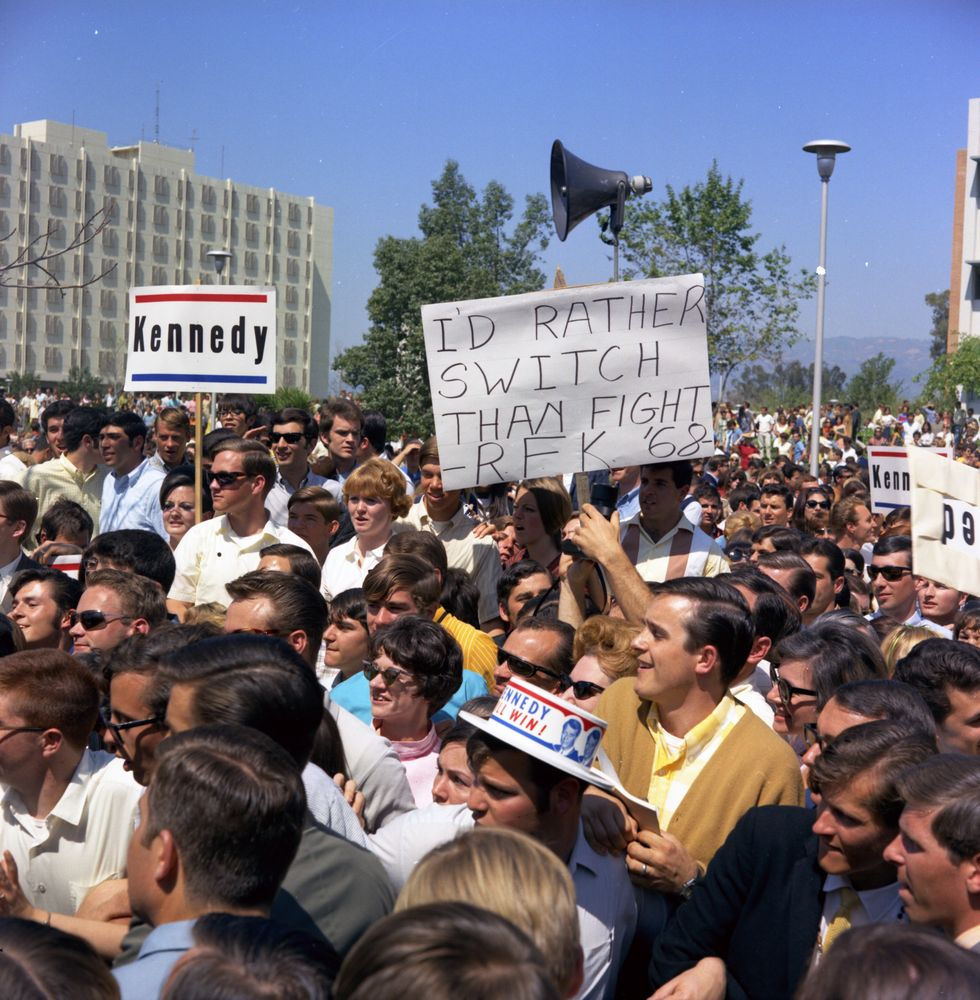
Robert F. Kennedy addresses the crowd at San Fernando Valley State College (modern day California State University, Northridge) in 1968.

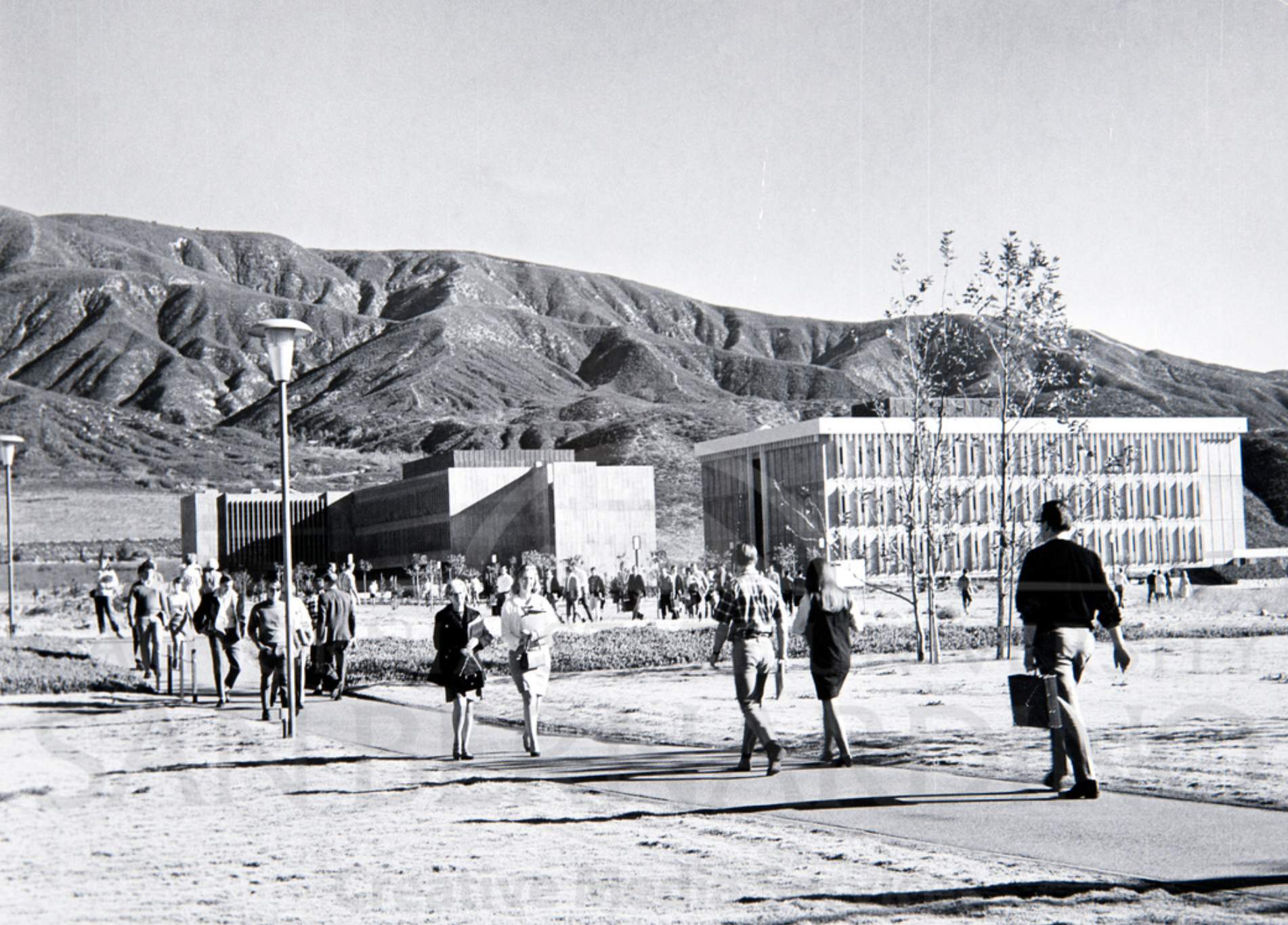
California State University, San Bernardino was founded in 1965.

Dumke reluctantly agreed to Kerr's terms only because he knew the alternative was worse. If the state colleges could not reach a deal with UC, the California legislature was likely to be caught up in the "superboard" fad then sweeping through state legislatures across the United States. A "superboard" was a state board of higher education with plenary authority over all public higher education in the state—the number of states with superboards went from 16 in 1939 to 33 by 1969. Dumke was determined to prevent UC and the state legislature from reducing the state colleges to mere UC "satellites", the dark fate they had narrowly escaped in 1935. At the outset of negotiations, Wahlquist had already shot down Kerr's suggestion of the "Santa Barbara route", because the state colleges were well aware that Santa Barbara had languished under the Board of Regents' mismanagement for 15 years. Kerr never attempted to reformulate his proposal as a threat, but the specter of his "unstated threat" haunted the state colleges for the remainder of the negotiations. At least under Kerr's terms the state colleges would finally have their own systemwide board, and to Dumke, that was the most important thing. To ensure this compromise at the core of the Master Plan would stay intact through the legislative process, it was agreed that the entire package could be enacted only if the state legislature, the State Board of Education, and the UC Board of Regents all agreed with its two main components: (1) the joint doctorate and (2) the new board for the state colleges.

Most state college presidents and approximately 95 percent of state college faculty members (at the nine campuses where polls were held) strongly disagreed with the Master Plan's express endorsement of UC's primary role with respect to research and the doctorate, but they were still subordinate to the State Board of Education. In January 1960, Louis Heilbron was elected as the new chair of the State Board of Education. A Berkeley-trained attorney, Heilbron had already revealed his loyalty to his alma mater by joking that UC's ownership of the doctorate ought to be protected from "unreasonable search and seizure." He worked with Kerr to get the Master Plan's recommendations enacted in the form of the Donahoe Act, which was signed into state law on April 27, 1960.

Heilbron went on to serve as the first chairman of the Trustees of the California State Colleges (1960–1963), where he had to "rein in some of the more powerful campus presidents," improve the smaller and weaker campuses, and get all campuses accustomed to being managed for the first time as a system. Heilbron set the "central theme" of his chairmanship by saying that "we must cultivate our own garden" (an allusion to Candide) and stop trying to covet someone else's. Under Heilbron, the board also attempted to improve the quality of state college campus architecture, "in the hope that campuses no longer would resemble state prisons." (For example, at the height of the Great Depression, the state government had considered converting Cal Poly San Luis Obispo into a state prison.)

Although the state colleges had reported to Sacramento since 1921, the board resolved on August 4, 1961 that the headquarters of the California State Colleges would be set up in the Los Angeles area, and in December, the newly-formed chancellor's office was moved from Sacramento to a rented office on Imperial Highway in Inglewood. This location gained the unfortunate nickname of the "imperial headquarters". In 1965, the chancellor's office was moved to a larger office space, again rented, on Wilshire Boulevard in Los Angeles.

Buell G. Gallagher was selected by the board as the first chancellor of the California State Colleges (1961–1962), but resigned after only nine unhappy months to return to his previous job as president of the City College of New York. Dumke succeeded him as the second chancellor of the California State Colleges (1962–1982). As chancellor, Dumke faithfully adhered to the system's role as prescribed by the Master Plan, despite continuing resistance and resentment from state college dissidents who thought he had been "out-negotiated" and bitterly criticized the Master Plan as a "thieves' bargain". Disappointment with the Master Plan was widespread but was especially acute at Dumke's former campus, San Francisco State. Dumke retorted that his critics' ambitions to turn the state colleges into "baby Berkeleys" were "unrealistic". Looking back, Kerr thought the state colleges had failed to appreciate the vast breadth of opportunities reserved to them by the Master Plan, as distinguished from UC's relatively narrow focus on basic research and the doctorate. In any event, "Heilbron and Dumke got the new state college system off to an excellent start."

=== California State University and Colleges ===
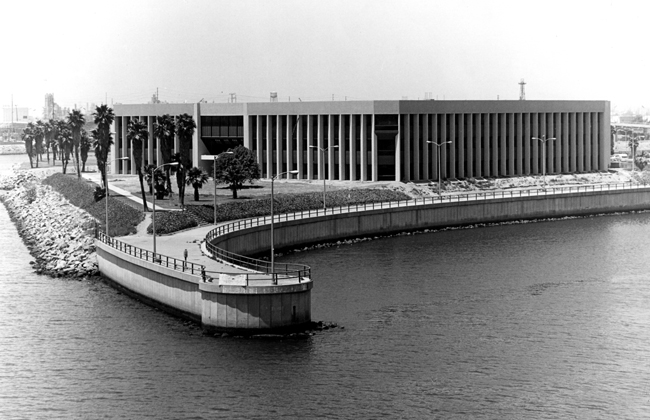
The first purpose-built headquarters of the California State University, built in 1976 in Long Beach.

In 1966, James R. Mills, a state assemblyman from San Diego, suggested studying the possibility of changing the name of the system to California State University. Much of the leadership on this matter emerged from the San Diego area in the following years, but several bills introduced by San Diego legislators failed to pass in the face of staunch opposition from the University of California. The final compromise was that the system would become the California State University and Colleges. Alex Sherriffs, then serving as an education advisor to Governor Reagan, later explained that he was among those who fought the name change because "most of the campuses are not, by any definition I've ever seen, a university. A university ... includes several colleges and is heavily engaged in scholarship and research. It gives the doctoral degrees". Governor Ronald Reagan signed Assembly Bill 123 into law on November 29, 1971 and the board was renamed the "Trustees of the California State University and Colleges".

In accordance with the new systemwide name, on May 23, 1972, the board of trustees voted to rename fourteen of the nineteen CSU campuses to "California State University," followed by a comma and then their geographic designation. The five campuses exempted from renaming were the five newest state colleges created during the 1960s.

The new names were strongly disliked at certain campuses. For example, CSUSF drew the humorous response "Gesundheit," and was frequently confused with CCSF, USF, and UCSF. Over Dumke's objections, state assemblyman Alfred E. Alquist proposed a bill that would rename the San Jose campus back to San Jose State. As passed and signed into law, the bill also renamed San Diego and San Francisco back to their old names. A few years later, the Sonoma and Humboldt campuses secured passage of similar legislation.

In September 1976, the chancellor's office was moved from Los Angeles to a custom-built headquarters at 400 Golden Shore on the Long Beach waterfront. This was the first time CSU had owned its own headquarters building.

=== California State University ===
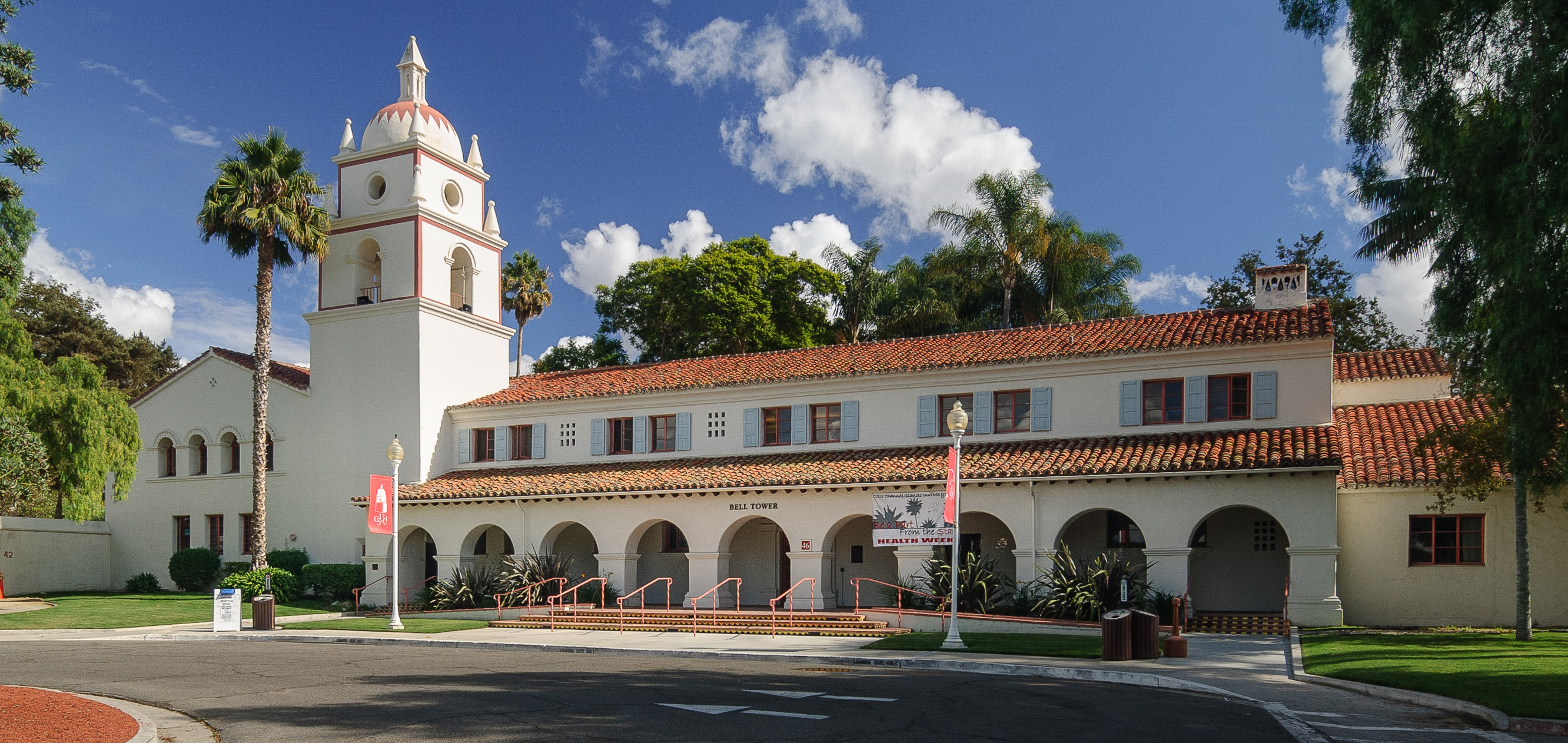
Established in 2002, California State University Channel Islands, in Camarillo, is the newest CSU campus.

Two major changes occurred in 1982. First, CSU was able to quietly obtain passage of a bill dropping the word "colleges" from its name. Second, W. Ann Reynolds succeeded Dumke as CSU's third chancellor, and brought a dramatically different management style to the CSU system. In many ways, Reynolds was the opposite of the "quiet" and "apolitical" Dumke. Despite the severe budget pressures brought about by the passage of Proposition 13, Reynolds was able to achieve moderate success in improving parity between CSU and UC funding. She was unsuccessful in her other long-term objective, securing for CSU the right to award doctorates independently of UC. When she asked Dumke for help, he replied that "he had given his word in 1960 and did not believe it principled to change." A week later, he testified before the state legislature and did not support the independent doctorate for CSU.

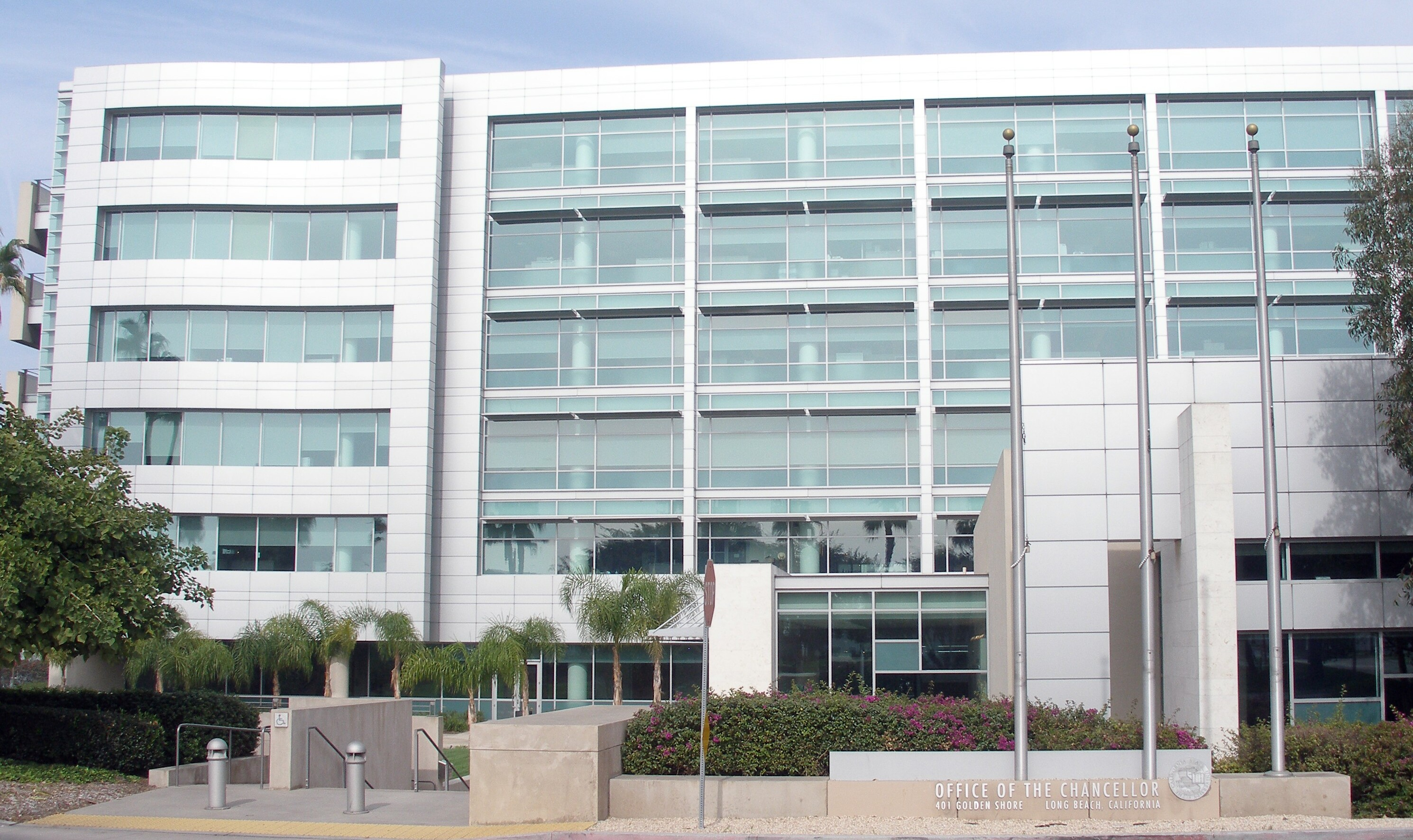
The Office of the Chancellor in Long Beach.

Meanwhile, various problems with the 400 Golden Shore building forced the chancellor's office to move to a new building after only 22 years. The solution was to trade spaces with the parking lot across the street to the north, a site with better soil conditions. In spring 1998, CSU moved into its current headquarters at 401 Golden Shore, then demolished the old building and turned its site into a parking lot.

In 1995, California Maritime Academy joined the California State University system as the twenty-second campus. In 2015 it was renamed as California State University Maritime Academy.

In May 2020, it was announced that all 23 institutions within the CSU system would host majority-online courses in the Fall 2020 semester as a result of the COVID-19 pandemic and the impact of the pandemic on education.

Near the end of 2022, the CSU actively opposed the proposed expansion of the California Community Colleges' right to confer a limited number of four-year bachelor's degrees. The community colleges involved noted how ironic it was for CSU to be pushing back against them, in light of CSU's long-running battle with UC over the right to award the doctorate.

In July 2023, CSU's systemwide Title IX compliance was harshly criticized in a report prepared by the Cozen O'Connor law firm at the request of the Board of Trustees (at a cost of over $1 million) and separately in another report prepared by the California State Auditor at the request of the Legislature. The Cozen report found that CSU's legal department and Title IX coordinators were severely understaffed. Cozen reported there was a widespread perception throughout the CSU system that "individual campus administrators act to protect the interests of the institution rather than care for the individuals who have been harmed".

In January 2024, CSU faculty including professors, lecturers, counselors, librarians and coaches began a system-wide strike. The strike, which consisted of 30,000 CSU faculty members and affected all of CSU's 23 campuses, was set to be held for five days, with faculty members seeking a 12% pay increase. The strike, which ended after less than a day, resulted in a tentative agreement with two 5% pay increases (one retroactive to July 1, 2023 and one planned for July 1, 2024) as well as extended parental leave, more increases for lower-paid faculty, and more benefits. Support for the agreement among faculty has been mixed.

In 2025, collapsing enrollment at Cal Maritime Academy forced its merger into Cal Poly San Luis Obispo, bringing the number of CSU campuses to 22. The Vallejo university was split into two branches, the Solano campus and Cal Poly Maritime Academy.

== Governance ==
The governance structure of the California State University is largely determined by state law. The California State University is ultimately administered by the 25-member board of trustees of the California State University. The trustees appoint the chancellor of the California State University, who is the chief executive officer of the system, and the presidents of each campus, who are the chief executive officers of their campuses.

The Academic Senate of the California State University, made up of elected representatives of the faculty from each campus, recommends academic policy to the board of trustees through the chancellor.

=== Board of trustees ===
The California State University is administered by the 25-member board of trustees, composed of:

- The governor of California (president ex officio)
- Sixteen members appointed by the governor of California with the consent of the Senate
- Two students from the California State University appointed by the governor with the recommendation of the Cal State Student Association
- One tenured faculty member appointed by the governor selected from a list of names submitted by the Academic Senate
- One representative of the alumni associations of the state university selected for a two-year term by the alumni council of the California State University
- Four ex officio members aside from the governor:
  - Lieutenant governor
  - Speaker of the Assembly
  - State superintendent of public instruction
  - The CSU chancellor

The board meets six times each year in the Glenn S. Dumke Auditorium at the Office of the Chancellor in Long Beach. Unlike the Regents of the University of California, the board does not regularly rotate the locations of its meetings between Northern and Southern California.

=== Chancellor ===
The chancellor is the chief executive officer of the CSU, and all presidents of the campuses report directly to the chancellor.

==== Chancellors ====
The following persons had served as the chancellor of the California State University system:

No.	Image	Chancellor	Start	End	Refs.
1		Buell Gallagher	July 1, 1961	February 13, 1962	
2		Glenn S. Dumke	April 5, 1962	August 31, 1982	
3		W. Ann Reynolds	September 1, 1982	May 16, 1990	
interim		Ellis E. McCune	May 16, 1990	July 31, 1991	
4		Barry Munitz	August 1, 1991	December 31, 1998	
5		Charles B. Reed	January 1, 1998	December 31, 2012	
6		Timothy P. White	January 1, 2013	December 31, 2020	
7		Joseph I. Castro	January 4, 2021	February 17, 2022	
Acting		Steve Relyea	February 17, 2022	April 30, 2022	
interim		Jolene Koester	May 1, 2022	September 30, 2023	
8		Mildred García	October 1, 2023	present	

=== Student government ===
All 22 campuses have student government organizations, and are all members of the California State Student Association (CSSA). California Education Code § 89300 allows for the creation of student body organizations at any state university for the purpose of providing essential activities closely related to, but not normally included as a part of, the regular instructional program.

== Campuses ==
The 22 California State campuses

The CSU is composed of 22 main campuses, of which 10 are located in Northern California and 12 in Southern California. The 22 campuses are listed here by order of the year founded:

Campus	School name	Founded	Enrollment (Fall '25)	Endowment (FY25, in millions)	Athletics		Rankings			
Campus	School name	Founded	Enrollment (Fall '25)	Endowment (FY25, in millions)	Affiliation	Nickname	USNWR (West region, 2027)	Washington Monthly (Masters, '25)	Forbes (National, 2027)	CWUR (World, 2025)
San José	San José State University	1857	35,298	$231.15	D-I (MW)	Spartans	137 (Nat. Univ.)*	23	132	1522
Chico	California State University, Chico	1887	14,823	$111.07	D-II (CCAA)	Wildcats	16	6	251	—
San Diego	San Diego State University	1897	41,184	$488.73	D-I (Pac-12)	Aztecs	137 (Nat. Univ.)*	99 (Nat. Univ.)*	94	644
San Francisco	San Francisco State University	1899	20,713	$186.39	D-II (CCAA)	Gators	227 (Nat. Univ.)*	76 (Nat. Univ.)*	141	1456
San Luis Obispo	California Polytechnic State University, San Luis Obispo	1901	23,245	$335.82	D-I (BWC)	Mustangs	1	162	70	1423
Fresno	California State University, Fresno (Fresno State)	1911	24,992	$277.34	D-I (Pac-12)	Bulldogs	208 (Nat. Univ.)*	22 (Nat. Univ.)*	154	1518
Humboldt (Note: Cal Poly Humboldt is located in Arcata, California.)	California State Polytechnic University, Humboldt	1913	6,276	$46.68	D-II (CCAA)	Lumberjacks	26	39	—	—
Pomona	California State Polytechnic University, Pomona	1938	27,221	$203.80	D-II (CCAA)	Broncos	2	11	104	—
Los Angeles	California State University, Los Angeles	1947	21,708	$71.20	D-II (CCAA)	Golden Eagles	148 (Nat. Univ.)*	2	216	1678
Sacramento	California State University, Sacramento (Sacramento State)	1947	31,274	$96.41	D-I (BWC)	Hornets	208 (Nat. Univ.)*	3	171	1441
Long Beach	California State University, Long Beach (Long Beach State)	1949	42,173	$216.65	D-I (BWC)	The Beach	137 (Nat. Univ.)*	44 (Nat. Univ.)*	137	1556
Fullerton	California State University, Fullerton	1957	45,147	$162.08	D-I (BWC)	Titans	156 (Nat. Univ.)*	60 (Nat. Univ.)*	205	1395
Stanislaus (Note: Cal State Stanislaus is located in Turlock, California)	California State University, Stanislaus	1957	9,398	$22.40	D-II (CCAA)	Warriors	12	5	286	—
East Bay (Note: Cal State East Bay is located in Hayward, California)	California State University, East Bay	1957	10,911	$28.00	D-II (CCAA)	Pioneers	24	145 (Nat. Univ.)*	273	—
Northridge (Note: Cal State Northridge is located in Los Angeles, California)	California State University, Northridge	1958	36,960	$249.51	D-I (BWC)	Matadors	17	1	265	1509
Dominguez Hills (Note: Cal State Dominguez Hills is located in Carson, California)	California State University, Dominguez Hills	1960	14,462	$28.56	D-II (CCAA)	Toros	33	4	469	—
Sonoma (Note: Sonoma State is located in Rohnert Park, California)	Sonoma State University	1960	5,000	$76.79	— (Note: Sonoma State shut down its athletic program at the end of the 2024–25 academic year, but will reinstate it in 2027–28, rejoining the California Collegiate Athletic Association at that time.)	Seawolves	23	84	315	—
San Bernardino	California State University, San Bernardino	1965	19,049	$62.98	D-II (CCAA)	Coyotes	17	31 (Nat. Univ.)*	317	—
Bakersfield	California State University, Bakersfield	1965	11,195	$46.51	D-I (BWC)	Roadrunners	25	8	323	—
San Marcos	California State University San Marcos	1989	15,441	$45.07	D-II (CCAA)	Cougars	20	16	403	—
Monterey Bay (Note: Cal State Monterey Bay is located in both Seaside, California and Marina, California)	California State University, Monterey Bay	1994	7,817	$56.48	D-II (CCAA)	Otters	12	9	413	—
Channel Islands (Note: Cal State Channel Islands is located in Camarillo, California)	California State University Channel Islands	2002	4,924	$42.70	—	Dolphins	118 (Lib. Arts Col.)*	33	428	—

* U.S. News & World Report ranks several universities in the California State University system in the National Universities category as they offer several Ph.D. programs. The other universities are ranked in the Regional Universities (West) category as they offer few or no Ph.D. programs.

== Peripheral enterprises ==
=== Off-campus branches ===
Several of the universities in the Cal State system operate branch campuses. Some of these branches have become or were formerly independent. Notably, California State University Channel Islands transitioned from an off-campus branch of CSU Northridge, and Cal Poly's Solano campus and Maritime Academy were originally an independent campus of the Cal State system.

The following is a list of schools and their off-campus branches:

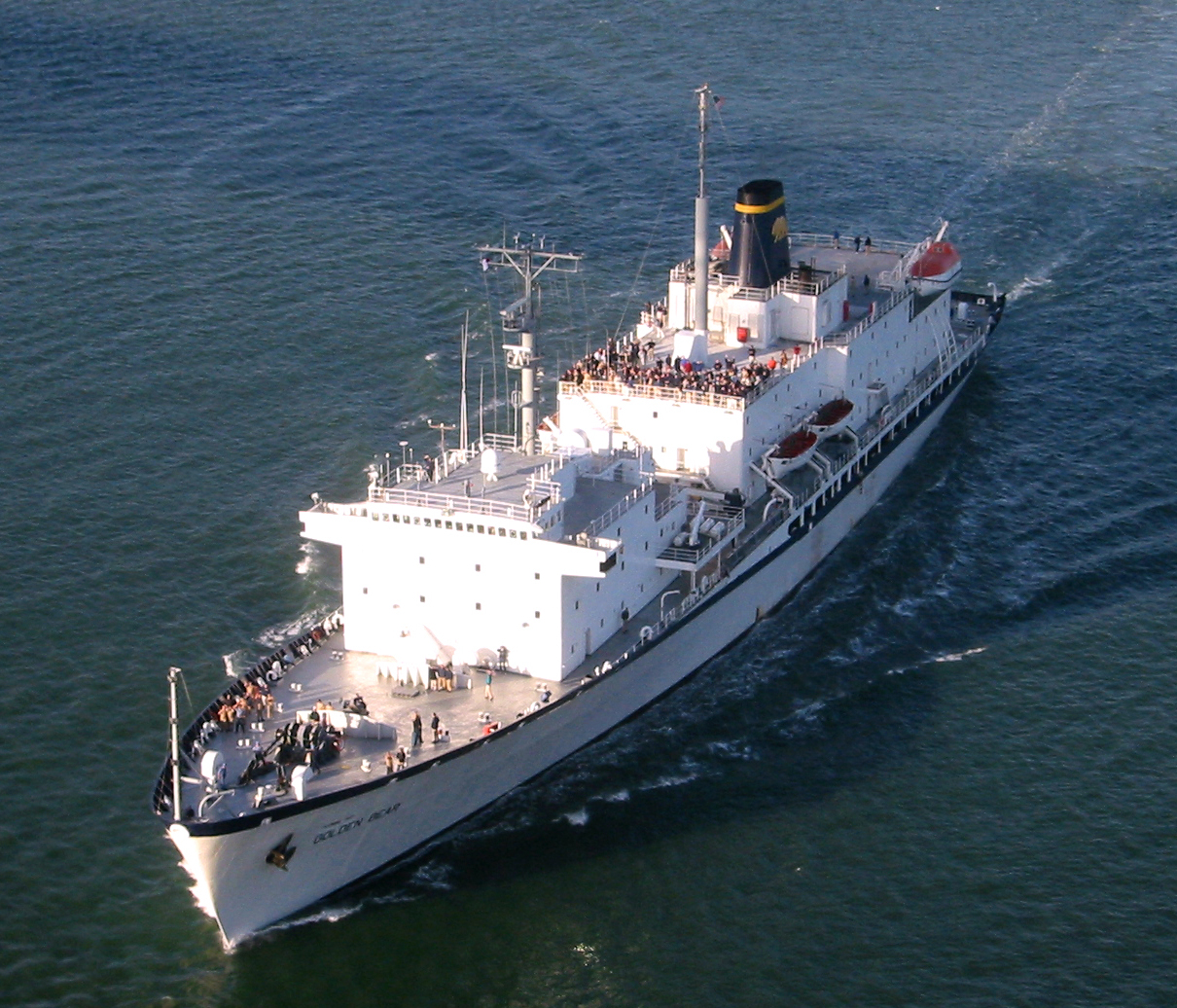
The TS Golden Bear is the training ship of Cal Poly Maritime Academy, based at Vallejo in the Bay Area.

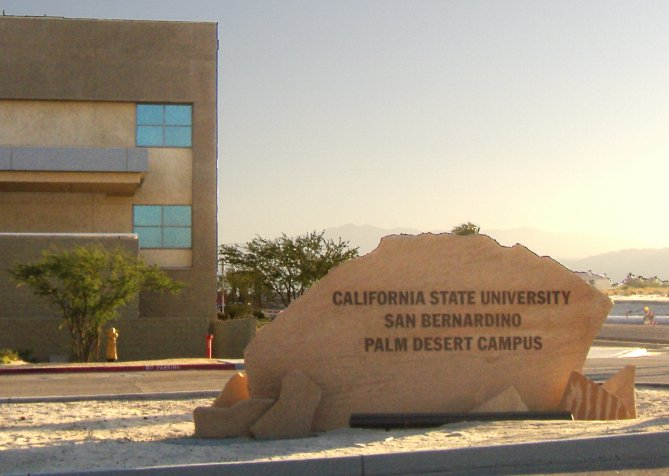
CSU San Bernardino's Palm Desert campus in the Coachella Valley.

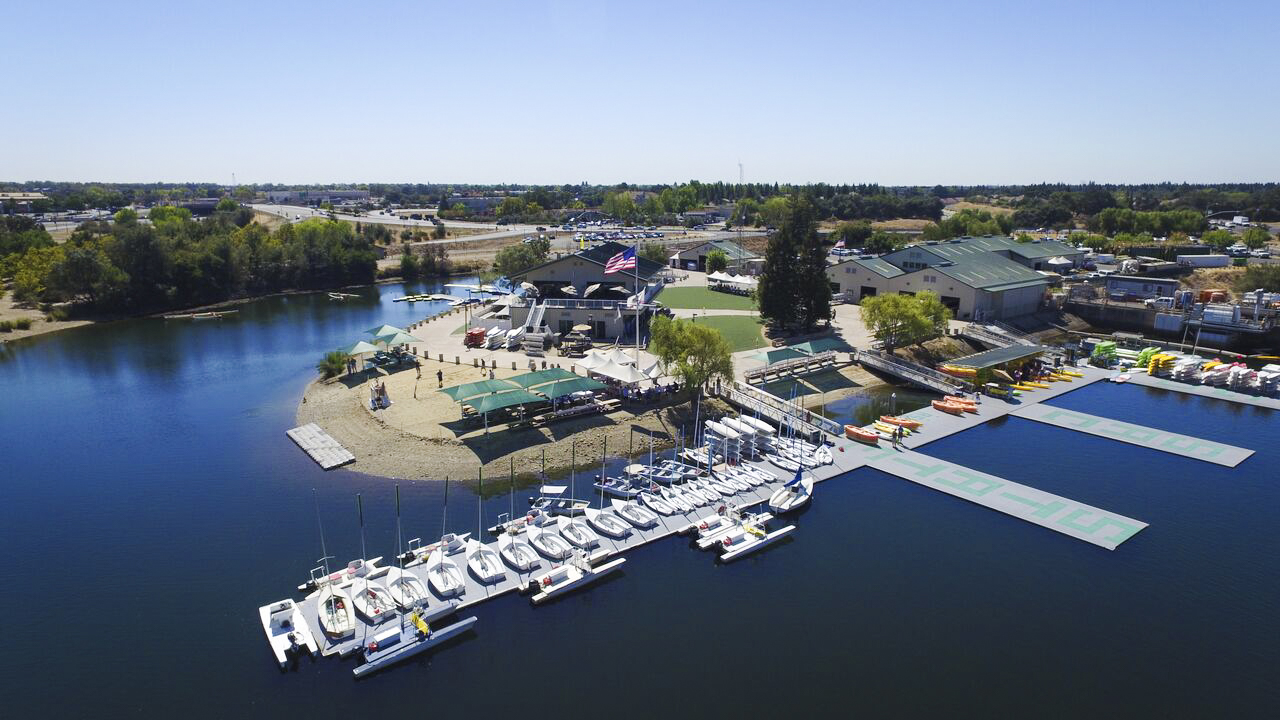
Sacramento State Aquatic Center at Lake Natoma, in Gold River.

- California Polytechnic State University, San Luis Obispo
  - Solano Campus (Vallejo)
    - Cal Poly Maritime Academy
- California State University, Bakersfield
  - Antelope Valley (Lancaster)
- California State University, Chico
  - Redding (affiliated with Shasta College)
- California State University, Fullerton
  - Garden Grove
  - Irvine
- California State University, East Bay
  - Concord
  - Professional & Conference Center (Oakland)
- California State University, Fresno
  - Visalia
- California State University, Los Angeles
  - Downtown Los Angeles
- California State University, Monterey Bay
  - Professional & Conference Center (Salinas)
- California State University, San Bernardino
  - Palm Desert
- California State University, San Marcos
  - Temecula/Murrieta
- San Diego State University
  - Imperial Valley Campus (Brawley and Calexico)
  - SDSU Georgia (Tbilisi, Georgia)
- San Francisco State University
  - Downtown Campus
  - Sierra Nevada Field Campus (Calpine)
  - Romberg Tiburon Campus (Tiburon)
- California State University, Stanislaus
  - Stockton Center

=== Laboratories ===
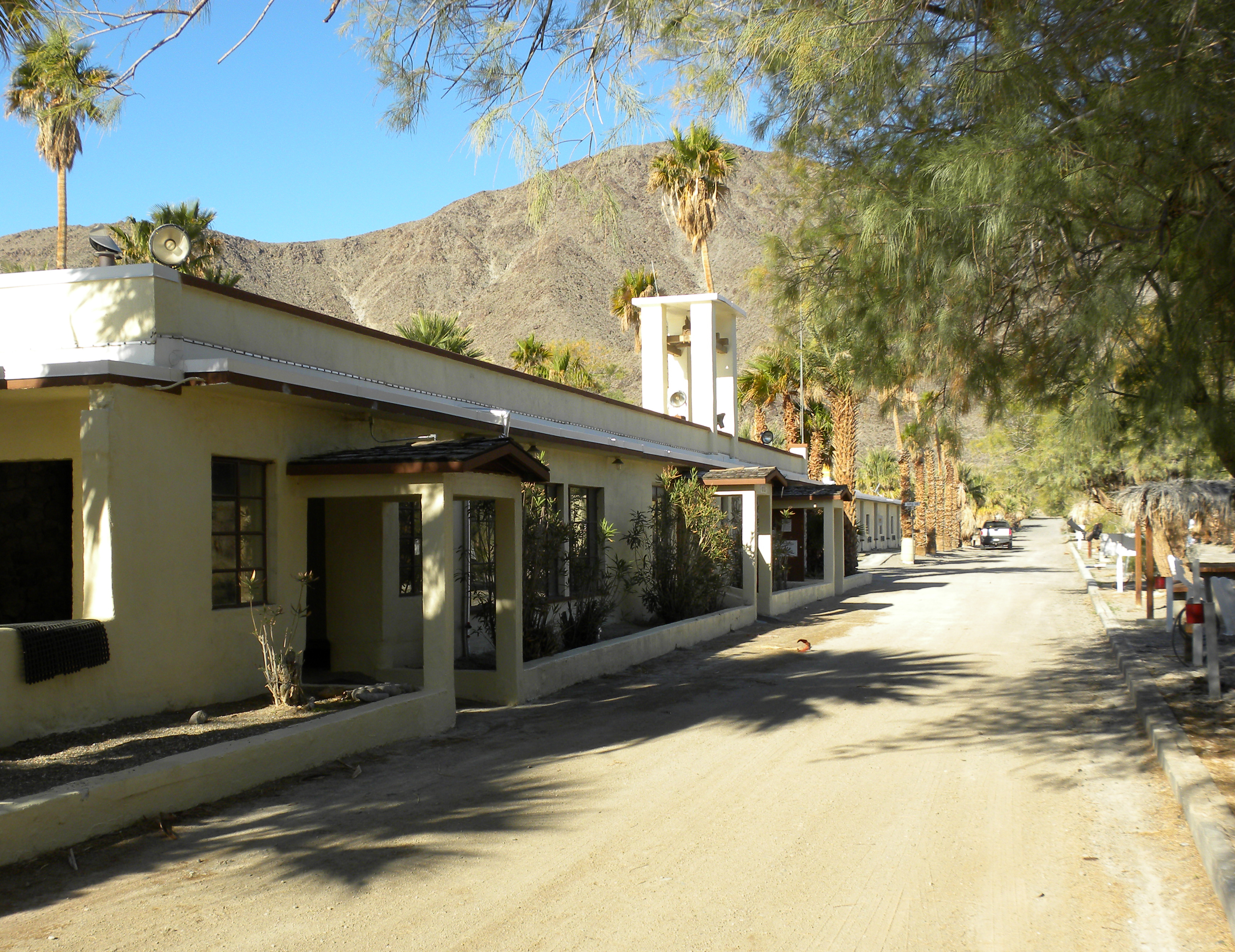
The Desert Studies Center in Zzyzx.

Research facilities owned and operated by units of the CSU include the following:

- Desert Studies Center, a research consortium and field site in Zzyzx managed by California State University, Fullerton
- Moss Landing Marine Laboratories, an independent degree-granting campus and oceanographic laboratory located in the Monterey Bay area managed by San Jose State
- Southern California Marine Institute, an oceanographic laboratory in the Los Angeles Basin
- Telonicher Marine Laboratory, a Cal State Humboldt marine research laboratory in Trinidad that is home to the research vessel R/V Coral Sea

=== Observatories ===
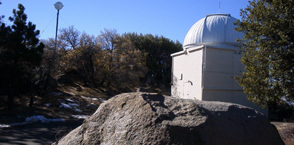
Mount Laguna Observatory in the Laguna Mountains.

Established in 1968, the Mount Laguna Observatory, managed by San Diego State's Department of Astronomy, is the oldest observatory in the CSU system. The CSU's other observatories include the Sonoma State Observatory and Cal State San Bernardino's Murillo Family Observatory.

=== High-performance networking ===
The California State University is a founding and charter member of the Corporation for Education Network Initiatives in California, a nonprofit organization that provides high-performance Internet-based networking to California's K-20 research and education community.

== Research and academics ==
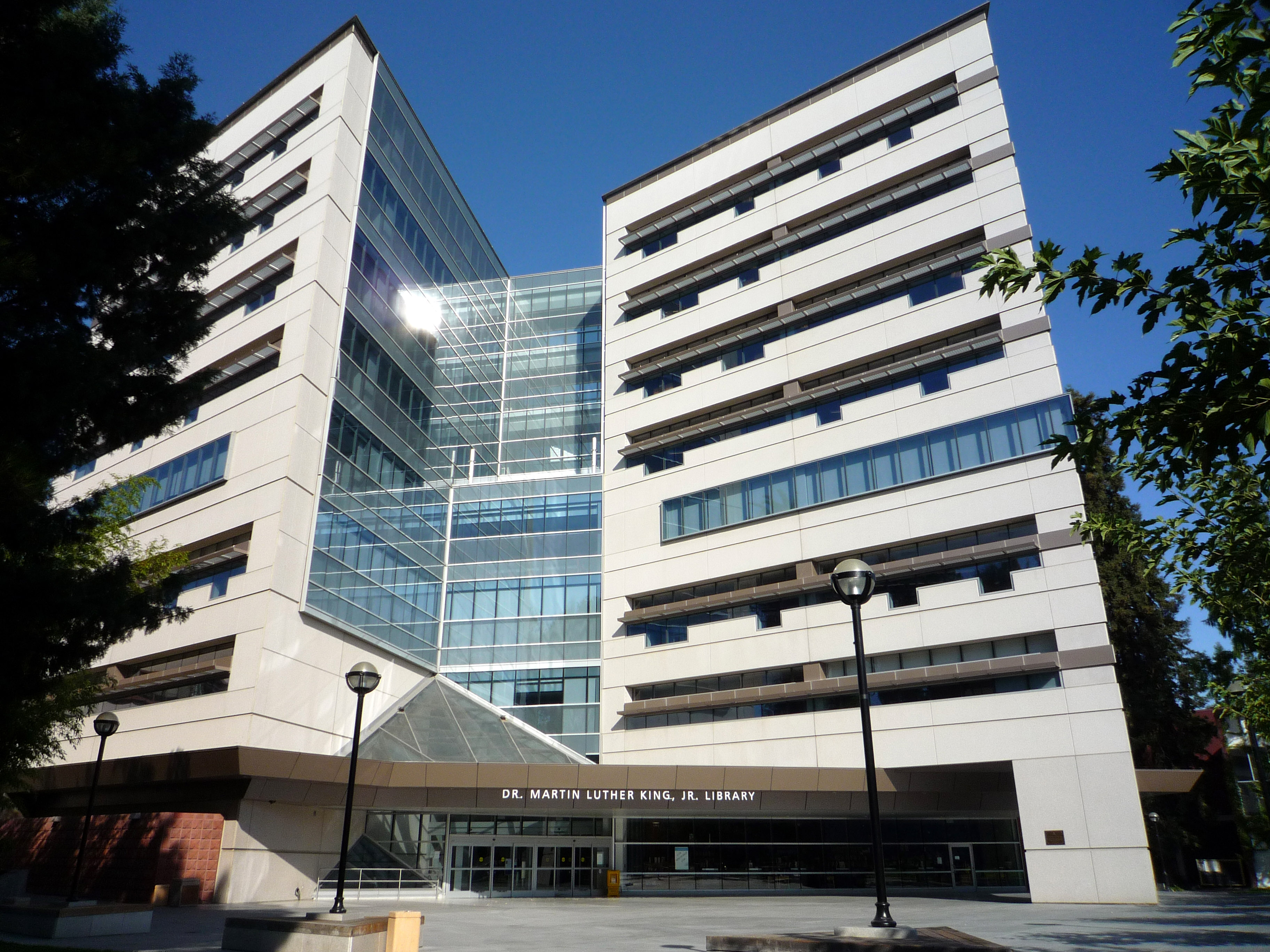
Dr. Martin Luther King Jr. Library, at San José, is the largest library in the Western United States.

The California State University (CSU) and most of its campuses are members of Association of Public and Land-grant Universities (APLU) and the American Association of State Colleges and Universities (AASCU).

The CSU is a founding and charter member of CENIC, the Corporation for Education Network Initiatives in California, the nonprofit organization which provides extremely high-performance Internet-based networking to California's K–20 research and education community.

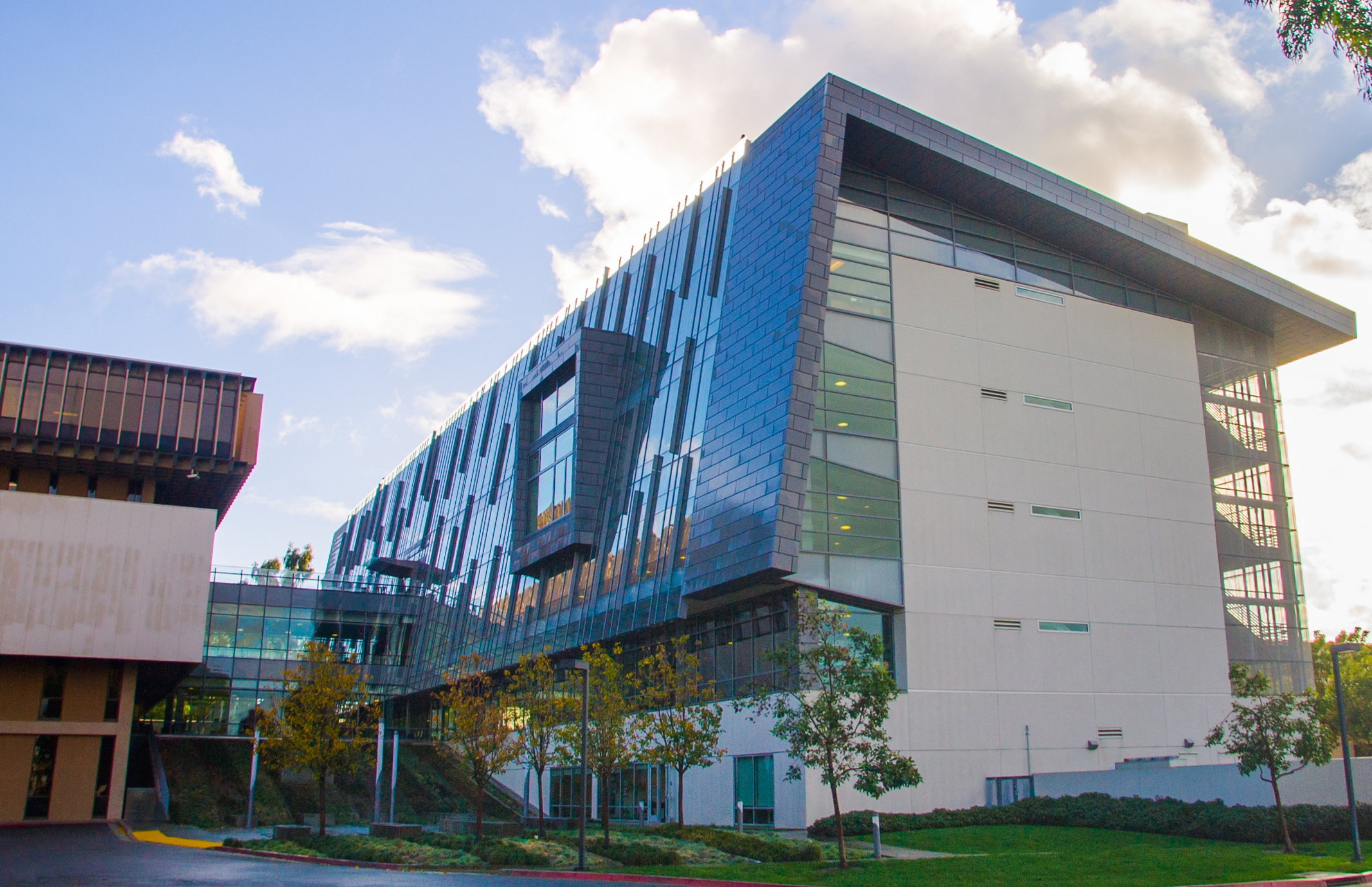
Cain Library at Domínguez Hills.

The California State University Program for Education and Research in Biotechnology (CSUPERB) mission is to develop a professional biotechnology workforce. CSUPERB provides grant funding, organizes an annual symposium, sponsors industry-responsive curriculum, and serves as a liaison for the CSU with government, philanthropic, educational, and biotechnology industry partners. The program involves students and faculty from Life, Physical, Computer and Clinical Science, Engineering, Agriculture, Math and Business departments at all 22 CSU campuses.

The Hospitality Management Education Initiative (HMEI) was formed in 2008 to address the shortage of hospitality leaders in California. HMEI is a collaboration between the 14 CSU campuses that have hospitality-related degrees and industry executives. CSU awarded 95% of hospitality bachelor's degrees in the state in 2011.

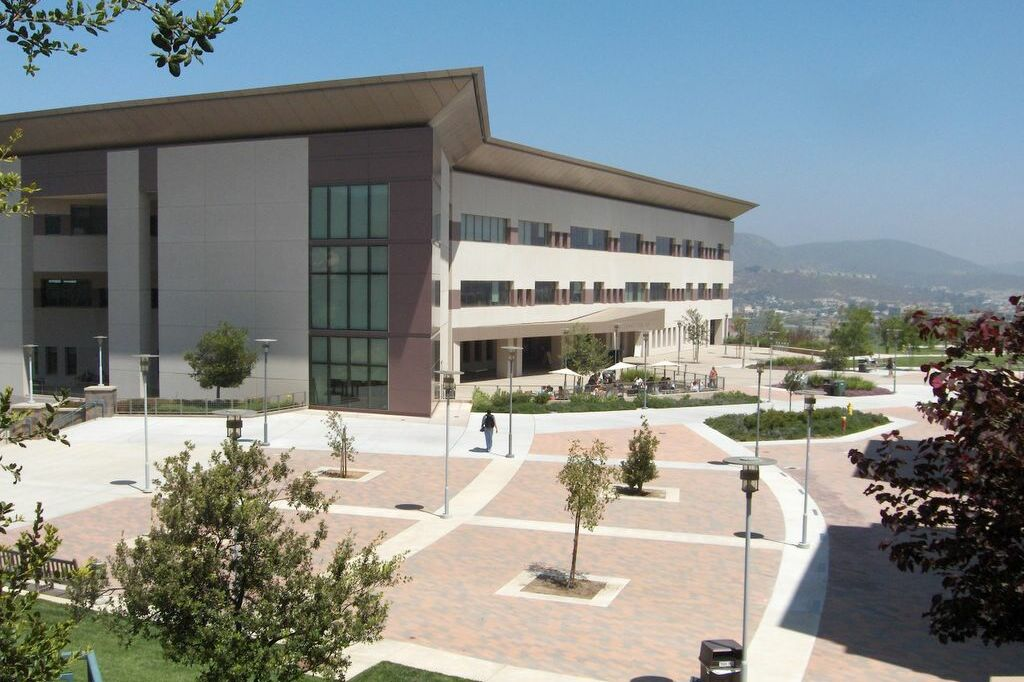
Kellogg Library at San Marcos.

ABET (Accreditation Board for Engineering and Technology) is the recognized U.S. accreditor of college and university programs in applied and natural science, computing, engineering, and engineering technology. The California State University has 18 colleges with ABET-accredited engineering programs (Pomona, San Luis Obispo, Maritime, Chico, Dominguez Hills, East Bay, Fresno, Fullerton, Long Beach, Los Angeles, Northridge, Sacramento, San Bernardino, Humboldt, San Diego, San Francisco, and San José).

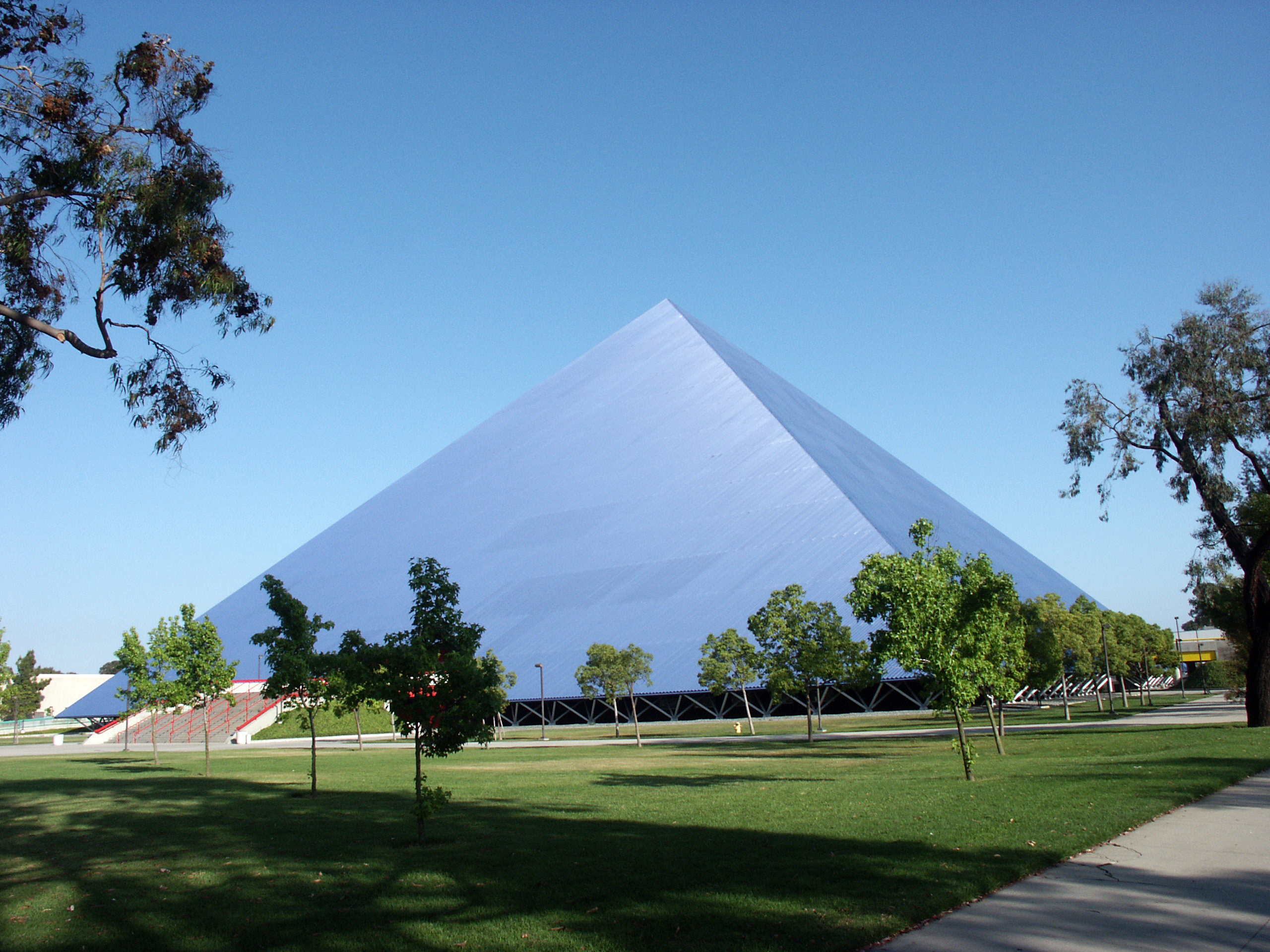
Walter Pyramid at Long Beach.

== Admissions ==
Historically, the requirements for admission to the CSU have been less stringent than the UC system. However, both systems require completion of the A-G requirements in high school as part of admission. The CSU attempts to accept applicants from the top one-third of California high school graduates. In contrast, the UC attempts to accept the top one-eighth. In an effort to maintain a 60/40 ratio of upper division students to lower division students and to encourage students to attend a California community college first, both university systems give priority to California community college transfer students.

However, the following CSU campuses use higher standards than the basic admission standards due to the number of qualified students who apply which makes admissions at these schools more competitive:

- Bakersfield (all nursing programs)
- Channel Islands (pre-licensure nursing)
- Chico (recording arts option within music, plus pre-licensure nursing)
- East Bay (nursing)
- Fullerton
- Humboldt (RN-to-BSN nursing only)
- Long Beach
- Los Angeles
- Northridge (accounting, cinema and television arts, music)
- Pomona
- Sacramento (business administration, criminal justice, graphic design, pre-licensure nursing, psychology)
- San Bernardino (criminal justice, kinesiology, pre-licensure nursing, psychology, social work)
- San Diego
- San Francisco (nursing, social work, and undeclared majors expressing an interest in nursing)
- San Jose
- San Luis Obispo
- San Marcos (biological sciences, business administration, electrical engineering, pre-licensure nursing, software engineering)
- Sonoma (criminology/criminal justice, human development, all nursing programs, psychology, sociology)
- Stanislaus (pre-licensure nursing, pre-nursing)

Furthermore, five California State University campuses are fully impacted for both freshmen and transfers, meaning in addition to admission into the school, admission into all majors is also impacted for the academic 2025–26 program. The five campuses that are fully impacted are Fullerton, Long Beach, San Diego, San Jose, and San Luis Obispo.

The only CSU campuses that are not impacted at either the freshman or transfer level for any academic program are Dominguez Hills, Fresno, and Monterey Bay.

Enrollment at the California State University

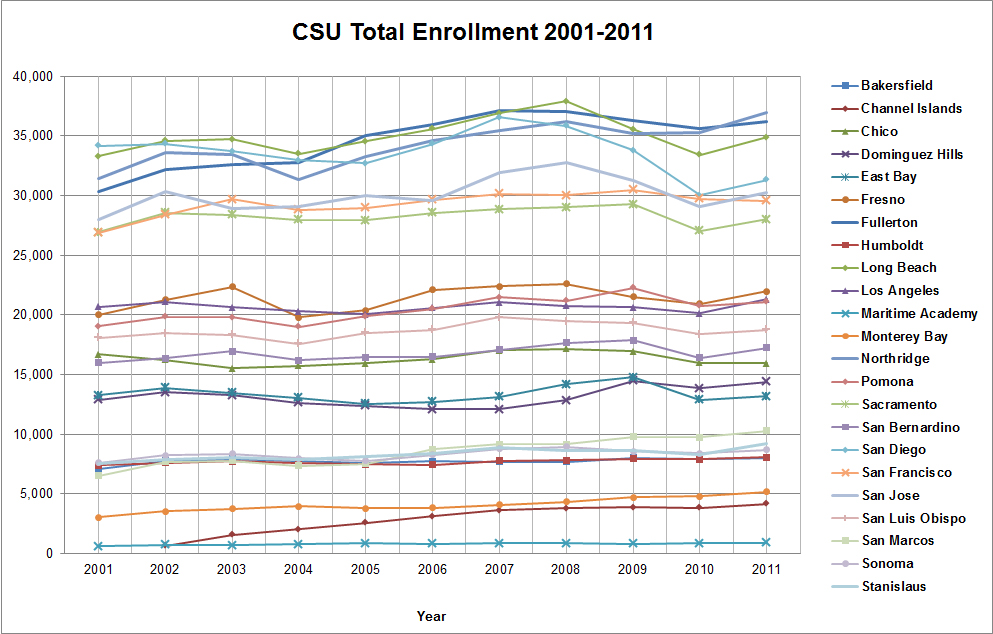
Enrollment for each CSU campus, 2001–11.

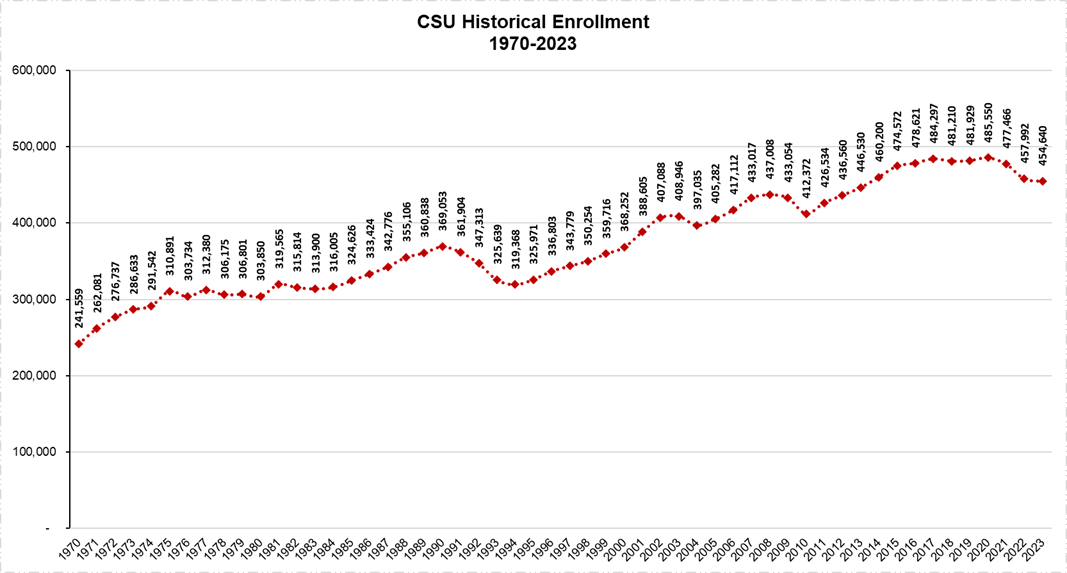
Enrollment for the CSU system, 1970–2023.

=== Student profile ===
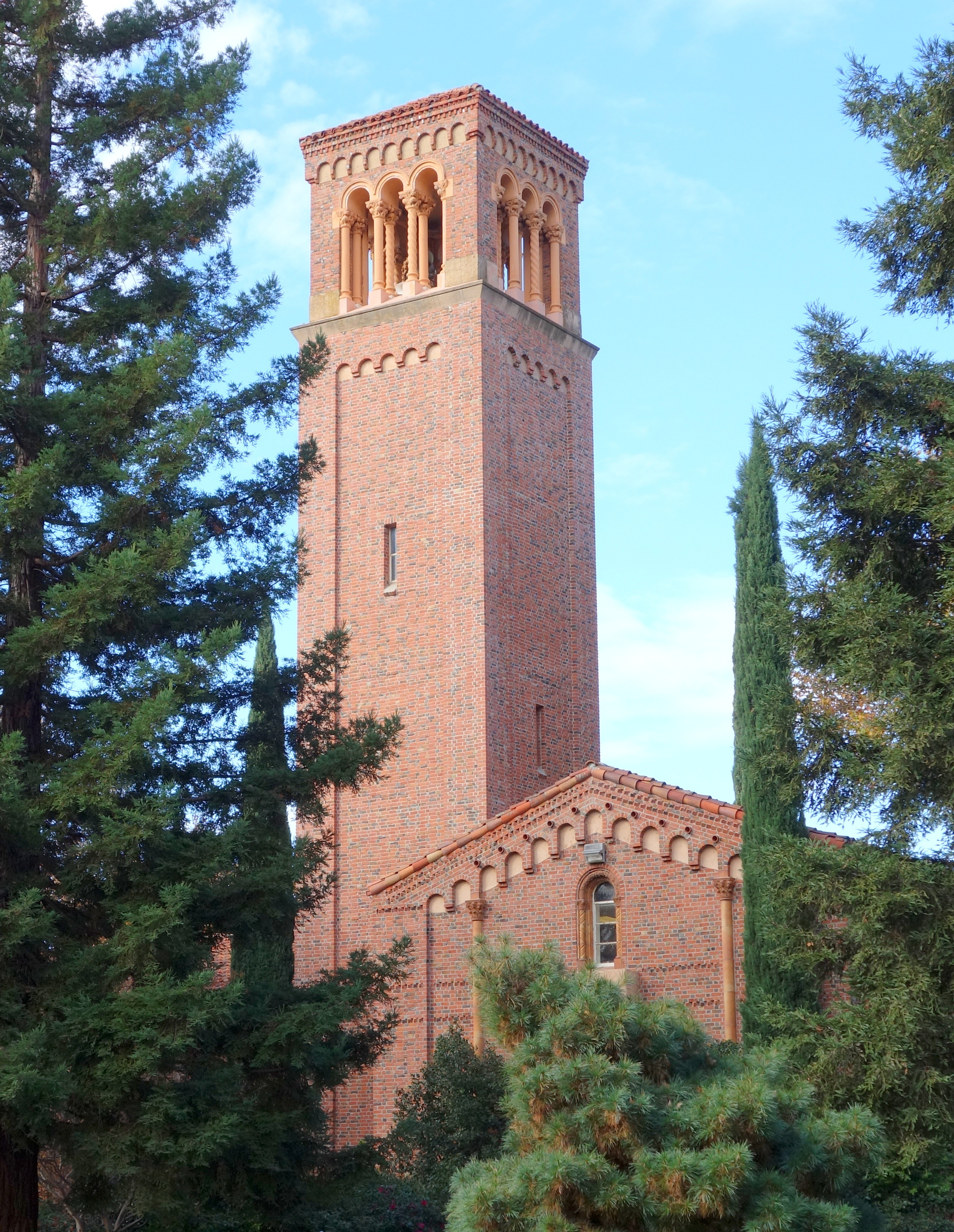
Trinity Hall at Chico.

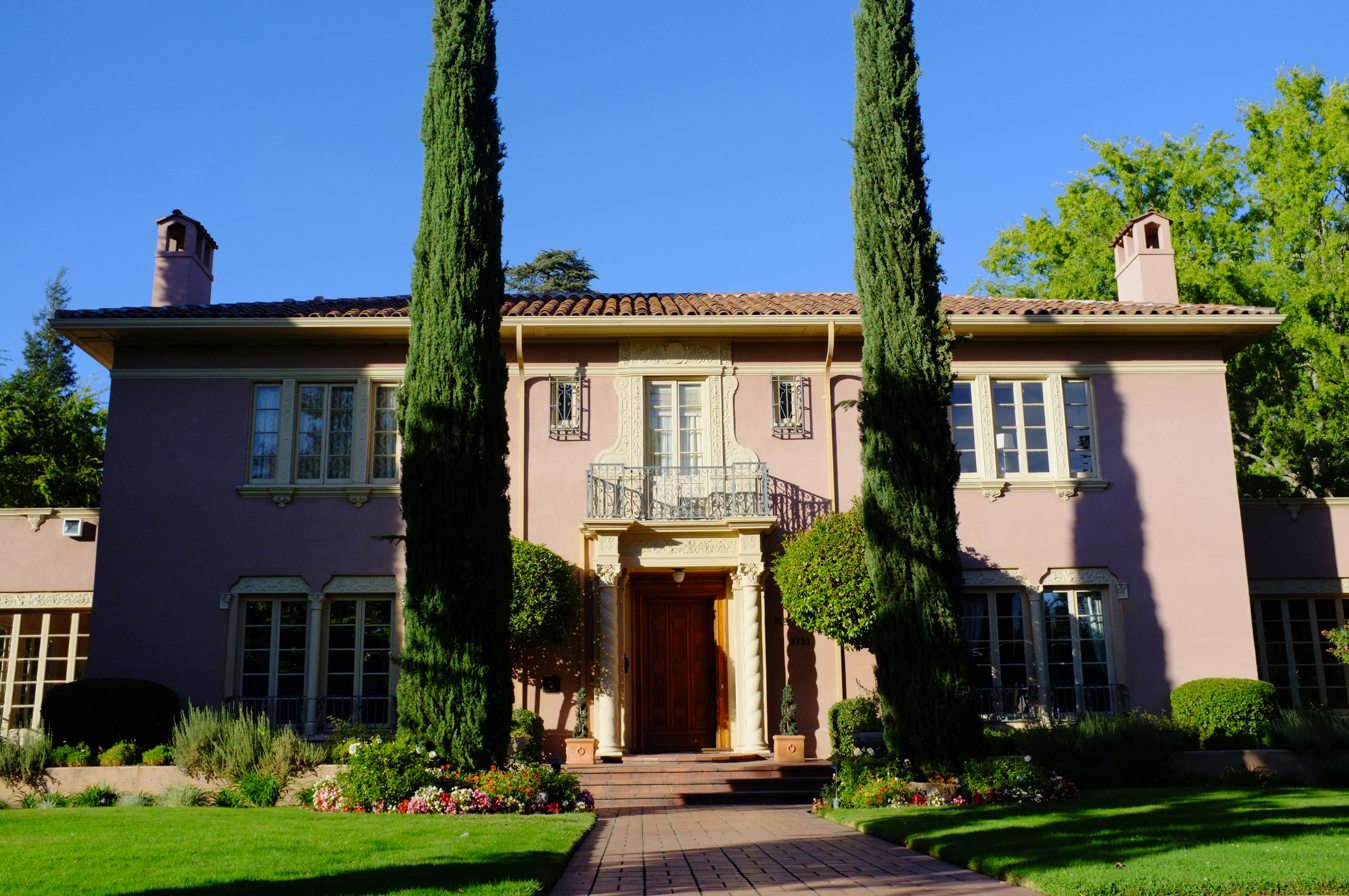
Julia Morgan House at Sacramento.

Undergraduate campus diversity (Fall 2024)
Campus	Asian	Black	Hispanic	International	Two or more races	Unknown	White	Low-income
Bakersfield	6%	4%	70%	1%	2%	4%	12%	64%
Channel Islands	6%	2%	60%	1%	4%	3%	22%	50%
Chico	5%	3%	39%	1%	6%	4%	41%	45%
Dominguez Hills	7%	13%	71%	1%	2%	2%	4%	66%
East Bay	22%	9%	41%	2%	5%	4%	15%	47%
Fresno	11%	3%	63%	2%	3%	3%	14%	60%
Fullerton	21%	3%	56%	1%	4%	2%	13%	51%
Humboldt	3%	3%	29%	0%	7%	5%	52%	45%
Long Beach	20%	4%	52%	2%	5%	2%	14%	52%
Los Angeles	10%	4%	78%	1%	2%	2%	4%	68%
Maritime	9%	4%	22%	0%	9%	5%	48%	28%
Monterey Bay	6%	2%	56%	1%	6%	2%	26%	47%
Northridge	9%	6%	58%	3%	3%	3%	18%	59%
Pomona	22%	2%	55%	1%	4%	2%	13%	49%
Sacramento	21%	7%	38%	2%	6%	2%	23%	52%
San Bernardino	6%	6%	73%	1%	3%	2%	9%	62%
San Diego	13%	3%	37%	2%	7%	3%	34%	34%
San Francisco	23%	7%	40%	4%	6%	4%	15%	46%
San José	39%	4%	33%	4%	5%	3%	12%	38%
San Luis Obispo	14%	1%	25%	1%	8%	3%	48%	21%
San Marcos	9%	4%	52%	1%	6%	3%	24%	45%
Sonoma	5%	3%	42%	0%	6%	3%	40%	39%
Stanislaus	9%	3%	63%	1%	3%	4%	17%	58%

Undergraduate student success outcomes (Fall 2024)
Campus	Retention rate (Note: The percentage of full-time students who return to this college after completing their freshman year.)	Graduation rate (Note: The percentage of students who graduate within 8 years of starting at this college.)	Net price (Note: The average yearly cost to attend this college for students from a family income of $0K to $30K, minus any grants and scholarships the student receives. For public colleges, this is the cost for in-state students.)	Federal loan rate (Note: The percentage of undergraduate students who borrowed federal loans to help pay for college.)	Median debt (Note: The median federal loan debt of graduates of this college. This includes only federal loans taken out at this college, and excludes private student loans, Parent PLUS loans, and federal loans taken out at other colleges.)	Median earnings (Note: The median yearly incomes of former students who received federal aid 4 years after graduating from the college.)
Bakersfield	79%	66%	$2,097	23%	$13,246	$59,109
Channel Islands	73%	73%	$5,195	24%	$14,000	$59,304
Chico	83%	74%	$9,227	32%	$14,259	$65,228
Dominguez Hills	69%	68%	$6,002	19%	$15,000	$58,922
East Bay	77%	69%	$4,576	26%	$16,500	$72,596
Fresno	80%	70%	$3,925	19%	$13,156	$59,992
Fullerton	84%	80%	$2,620	21%	$13,594	$63,753
Humboldt	76%	63%	$9,950	33%	$17,297	$51,571
Long Beach	86%	81%	$6,443	23%	$14,195	$63,140
Los Angeles	72%	69%	$1,364	18%	$14,576	$59,756
Monterey Bay	80%	75%	$10,966	29%	$11,000	$62,324
Maritime	77%	66%	$11,732	40%	$23,644	$108,757
Northridge	74%	72%	$4,429	22%	$15,000	$59,664
Pomona	88%	77%	$6,245	25%	$15,500	$71,138
Sacramento	81%	73%	$8,392	22%	$15,000	$64,511
San Bernardino	79%	71%	$2,331	24%	$14,625	$55,441
San Diego	90%	83%	$8,258	24%	$14,500	$68,268
San Francisco	83%	67%	$6,699	24%	$15,000	$67,804
San José	87%	77%	$10,381	19%	$14,750	$89,614
San Luis Obispo	95%	87%	$10,354	25%	$16,500	$90,662
San Marcos	77%	68%	$7,618	28%	$16,000	$67,891
Sonoma	77%	70%	$6,973	26%	$15,000	$65,997
Stanislaus	81%	71%	$1,658	21%	$13,000	$58,952

Notes

A 2016 study by the Cal State system estimated that as many as one in ten Cal State students experience homelessness during their time in college.

== Impact ==
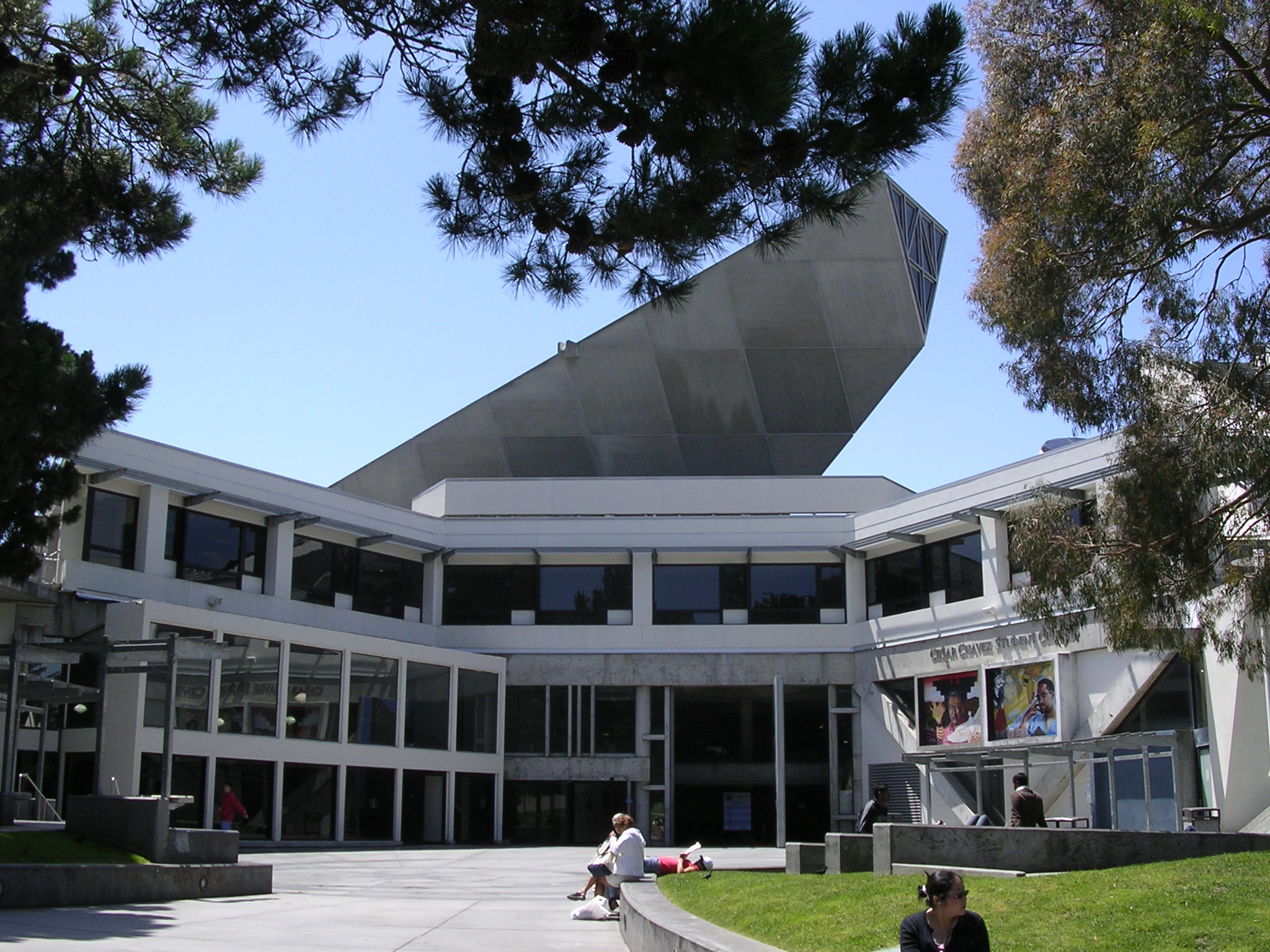
César Chávez Student Center at San Francisco.

The CSU confers over 110,000 degrees each year, awarding almost half of the state's bachelor's degrees and one-fourth of the state's master's degrees. The entire 22 campus system sustains over 209,000 jobs statewide, generating $1.6 billion in tax revenue. Total CSU related expenditures equate to $26.9 billion.

The CSU produces 62% of the bachelor's degrees awarded in agriculture, 54% in business, 44% in health and medicine, 64% in hospitality and tourism, 45% in engineering, and 44% of those in media, culture and design. The CSU is the state's largest source of educators, with more than half of the state's newly credentialed teachers coming from the CSU, expanding the state's rank of teachers by nearly 12,500 per year.

Over the last 10 years, the CSU has significantly enhanced programs towards the underserved. 56% of bachelor's degrees granted to Latinos in the state are from the CSU, while 60% of bachelor's awarded to Filipinos were from the CSU. In the Fall of 2008, 42% of incoming students were from California Community Colleges.

== Campus naming conventions ==
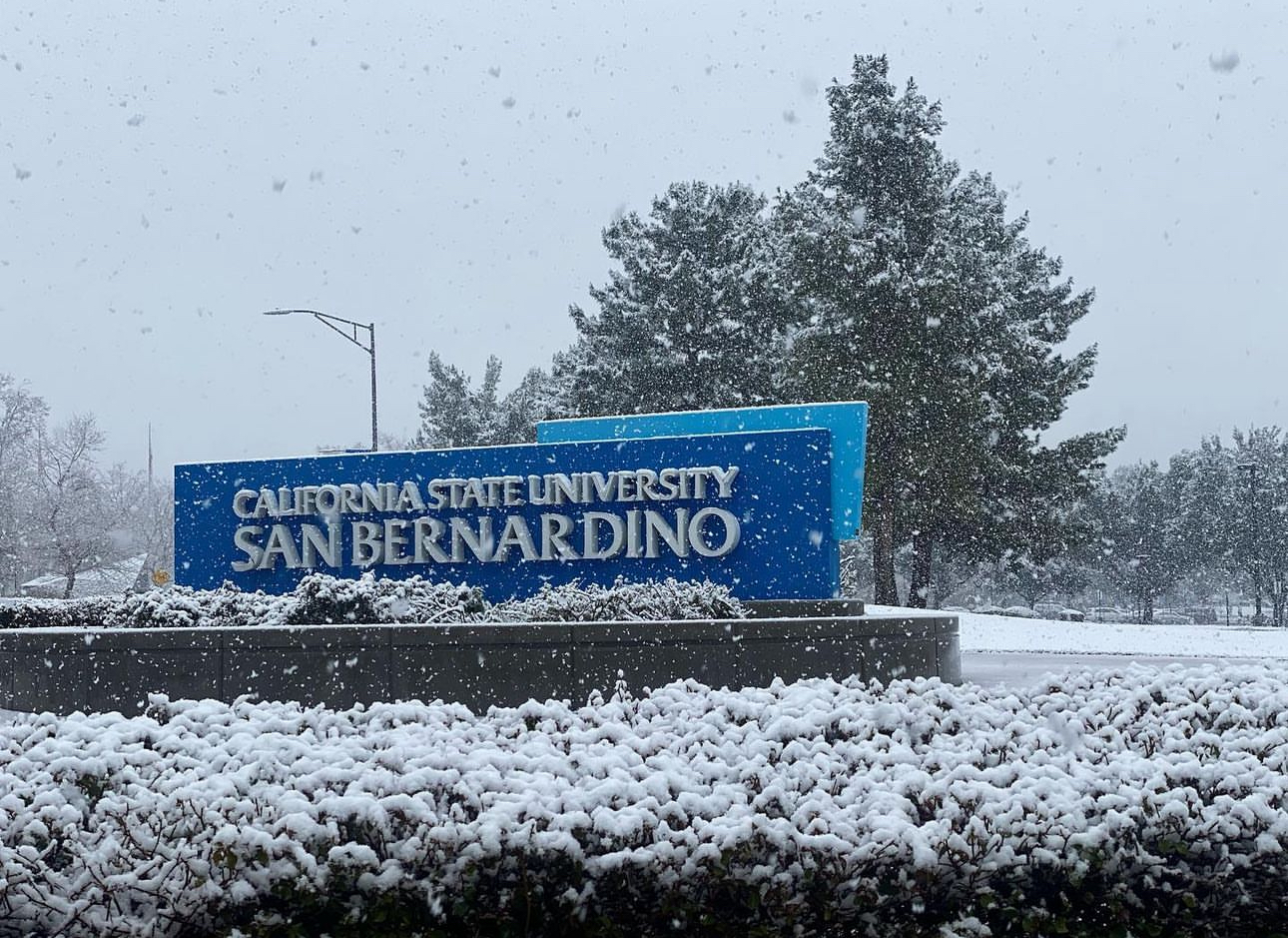
Entrance to CSU San Bernardino

The UC system follows a consistent style in the naming of campuses, using the words "University of California" followed by the name of its declared home city, with a comma as the separator. Most CSU campuses follow a similar pattern, though there are many exceptions. Several are named only for their home city or county, such as San Francisco State University, San Jose State University, San Diego State University, or Sonoma State University.

The Fresno and Sacramento campuses formally follow the standard naming pattern, but respectively market themselves as "Fresno State" and "Sacramento State", and use those terms for their athletic programs. Chico, Long Beach, and Stanislaus also formally use the standard naming pattern, but use "Location State" for athletics only. Northridge brands its athletic program as "CSUN", and uses that term alongside its formal name in marketing.

Channel Islands, and San Marcos are the only campuses whose names do not include a comma.

To reflect their polytechnic status, the San Luis Obispo, Pomona, and Humboldt campuses have added "Polytechnic" to their formal name, but differ on placement. The San Luis Obispo campus is officially a California Polytechnic State University, while the Pomona and Humboldt are California State Polytechnic Universities (emphasis added).

Some critics, including Donald Gerth (former President of Sacramento State), have claimed that the weak California State University identity has contributed to the CSU's perceived lack of prestige when compared to the University of California.

Cal Poly names

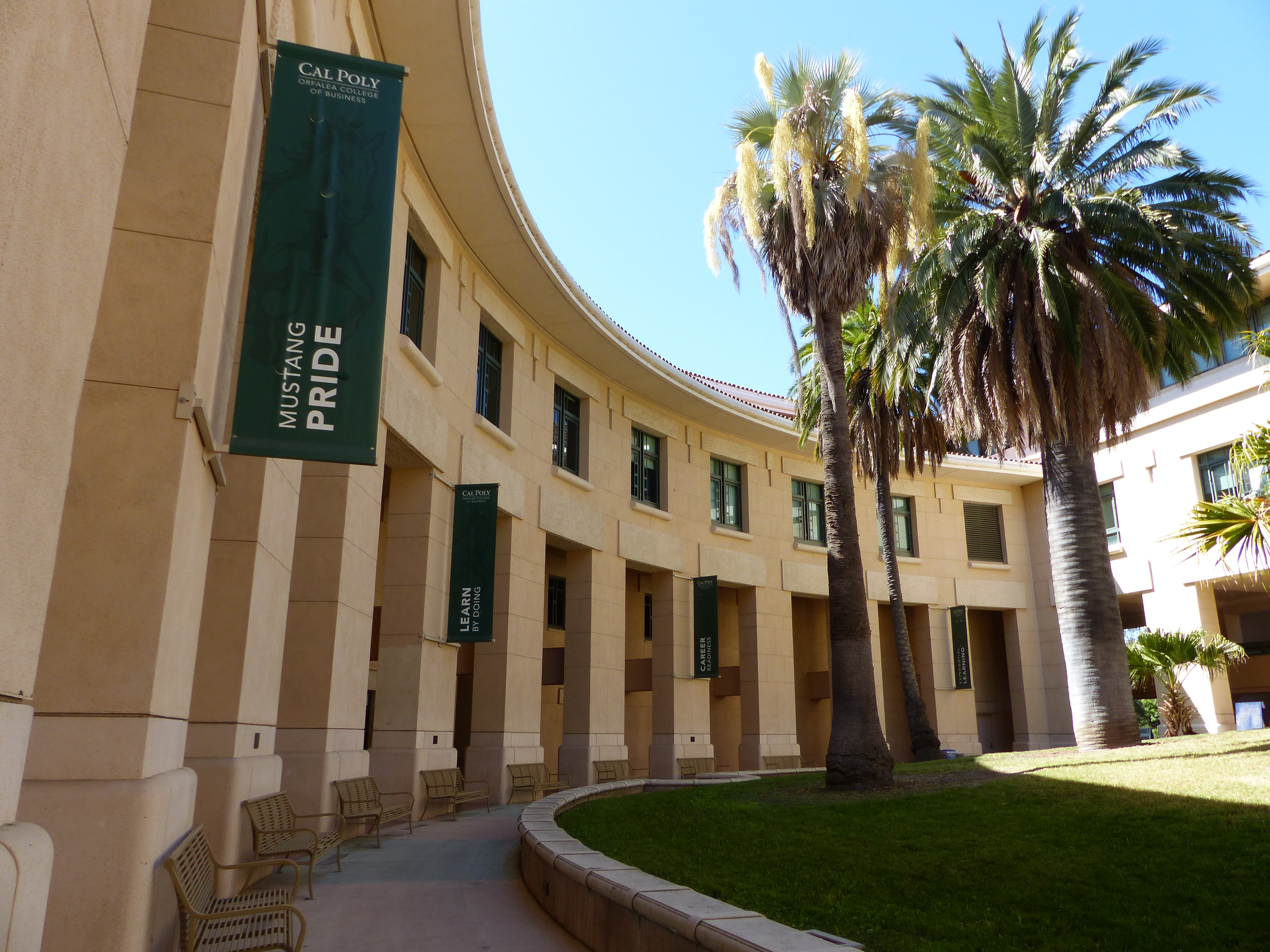
California Polytechnic State University, San Luis Obispo (Cal Poly)

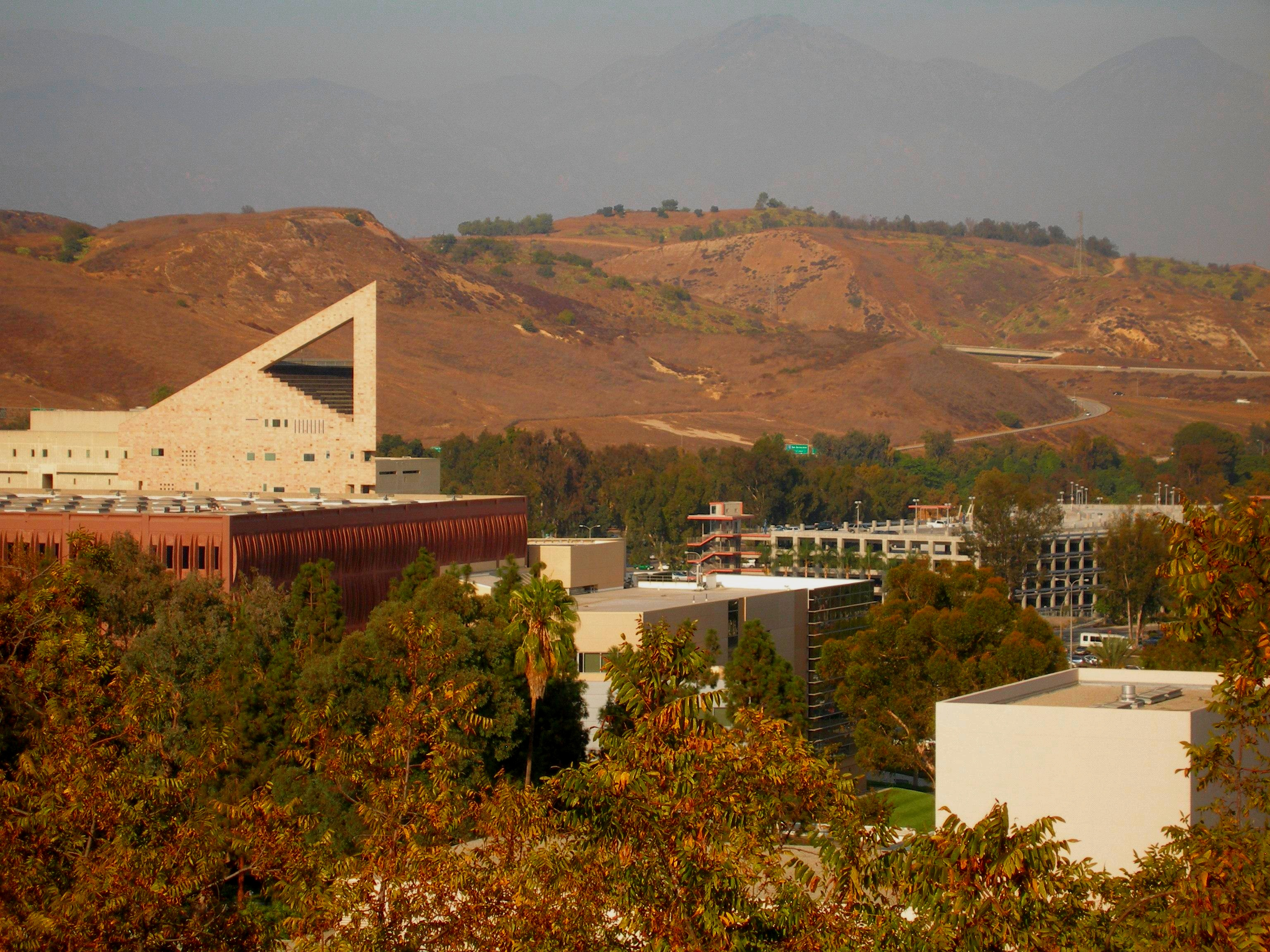
California State Polytechnic University, Pomona (Cal Poly Pomona)

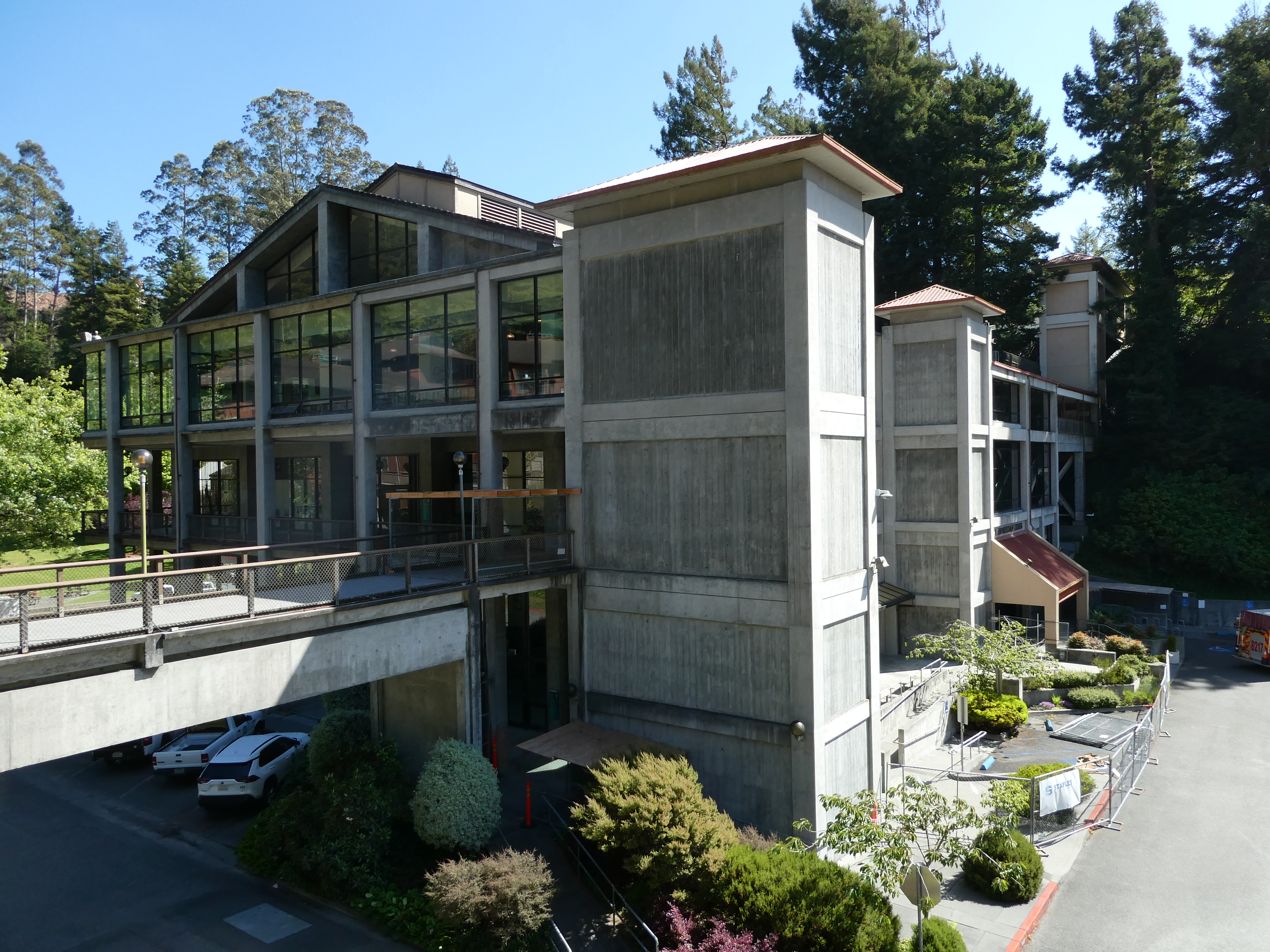
California State Polytechnic University, Humboldt (Cal Poly Humboldt)

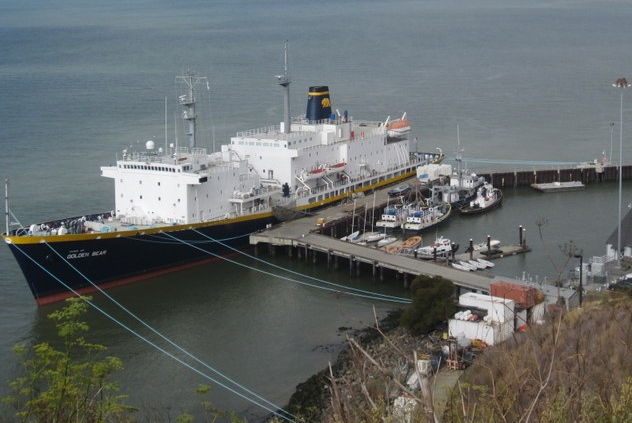
Formerly the California State University Maritime Academy, the campus became both the Cal Poly Maritime Academy and Cal Poly, Solano Campus

== Differences between the CSU and UC systems ==
Both California public university systems are publicly funded higher education institutions. There are 22 CSU campuses and 10 UC campuses representing approximately 437,000 and 237,000 students respectively. The cost of CSU tuition is approximately half that of UC. Despite having far fewer students, the largest UC campus, UCLA, as a result of its research emphasis and medical center, has a budget ($7.5 billion as of 2019) roughly equal to that of the entire CSU system ($7.2 billion as of 2019).

According to a 2002 study, faculty at the CSU spend about 30 hours a week teaching and advising students and about 10 hours a week on research/creative activities, while a 1984 study reports faculty at the UC spend about 26 hours a week teaching and advising students and about 23 hours a week on research/creative activities.

CSU's Chancellor, Dr. Charles B. Reed, pointed out in his Pullias Lecture at the University of Southern California that California was big enough to afford two world-class systems of public higher education, one that supports research (UC) and one that supports teaching (CSU). However, student per capita spending is lower at CSU, and that, together with the lack of a research mission or independent doctoral programs under the California Master Plan, has led some in American higher education to develop the perception that the CSU system is less prestigious than the UC system. Kevin Starr, the seventh State Librarian of California, described CSU in a published history of California in the 1990s as "in so many ways the Rodney Dangerfield of public higher education".

According to the California Master Plan for Higher Education (1960), both university systems may confer bachelors or master's degrees as well as professional certifications, however only the University of California has the authority to issue Ph.D degrees (Doctor of Philosophy) and professional degrees in the fields of law, medicine, veterinary, and dentistry. As a result of legislation introduced in 2005 and 2010 (SB 724 and AB 2382, respectively), the California State University may now offer doctoral degrees in Education and Physical Therapy. Additionally, the California State University (CSU) offers Ph.D degrees and some professional doctorates as a joint degree in combination with other institutions of higher education, including joint degrees with the University of California and accredited private universities.

CSU and UC use the terms "president" and "chancellor" internally in opposite ways: At CSU, the campuses are headed by presidents who report to a systemwide chancellor; but at UC, they are headed by chancellors who report to a systemwide president.

CSU has traditionally been more accommodating to older students than UC, by offering more degree programs in the evenings and, more recently, online. In addition, CSU schools, especially in more urban areas, have traditionally catered to commuters, enrolling most of their students from the surrounding area. This has changed as CSU schools increase enrollment and some of the more prestigious urban campuses attract a wider demographic.

As of 2026, all Cal State campuses operate on the semester system while most UC campuses operate on the quarter system. Beginning in fall 2014, CSU began converting its six remaining quarter campuses to the semester calendar. Cal State LA and Cal State Bakersfield converted in fall 2016, while Cal State East Bay and Cal Poly Pomona transitioned to semesters in fall 2018. Cal State San Bernardino made the conversion in fall 2020, while Cal Poly San Luis Obispo announced its conversion by fall 2026.

== See also ==
- California State University Employees Union
- California State University Emeritus and Retired Faculty Association
- California State University Police Department
- List of colleges and universities in California
