= California State University Emeritus and Retired Faculty and Staff Association =

Statewide, nonprofit organization of emeritus

The California State University Emeritus and Retired Faculty & Staff Association, also known as CSU-ERSFA, is a statewide, nonprofit organization of emeritus and retired faculty and staff members from all 23 California State University system campuses. The primary mission of CSU-ERFSA is the protection of pension and health care benefits for both active and retired California State University faculty and staff members. CSU-ERFSA represents the interests of its members before the California State Legislature, various state and federal agencies, CalPERS, and the California State University Chancellor's Office. CSU-ERFSA also assist members who may be experiencing difficulties with their individual pension or health care benefits.

== History ==
The association was formed in 1985 as the California State University Emeritus and Retired Faculty Association (CSU-ERFA) in response to threats and attempts to reduce or eliminate CSU retirees' rights, privileges and benefits and to support the activities of retired faculty as continuing members of the academic community. In 2018, members of CSU-ERFA voted to amend the organization's constitution to expand membership eligibility to all the California State University System retirees and to change the organization's name to reflect the expanded membership eligibility. Currently, CSU-ERFSA has approximately 2,500 members, 300 of whom live outside California. In addition to protecting retiree benefits, the association supports emeritus and retired faculty and staff associations at the individual state university campuses. At present, retired faculty associations at 18 of the 23 campuses maintain a formal affiliation with CSU-ERFSA. However, membership in an affiliate is not a condition for membership in the statewide organization.

In 1989, CSU-ERFSA (then CSU-ERFA) successfully convinced the CSU Board of Trustees to adopt the resolution (RFSR 06-89-03) which established that "the... emeritus faculty shall be deemed to be continuing members of the academic community" and shall have privileges "on the same basis as the general faculty enjoy them." In conjunction with other California public employee organizations, CSU-ERFSA helped to secure the passage of Proposition 162, the California Pension Protection Act of 1992, that protects the use of pension funds for general budget purposes.

CSU-ERFSA worked with the Public Employees Retirement System (CalPERS) to establish the CalPERS Long-Term Care Insurance Program. CSU-ERFSA influenced several features of the program, including its flexibility, consumer protection standards, and the California Partnership option.

CSU-ERFSA successfully supported federal and state legislation that eliminated the source tax for retirees living in a different state from that which provides their pension income. Because of these laws, the pension income of CSU retirees living outside California is subject only to the state income tax of their state of residence.

== Activities ==
Most CSU-ERFSA members receive retirement and health care benefits from the California Public Employees Retirement System (CalPERS), and many older retirees receive their retirement benefits from the California State Teachers Retirement System (CalSTRS). CSU-ERFSA provides assistance to its members who experience problems with their pension and health care benefits.

CSU-ERFSA makes retirement planning advice available to active California State University faculty members. In addition, CSU-ERFSA operates a grants program that supports its members' research, scholarly, and creative activities. Funding for this program is provided by the CSU-ERFA Charitable Foundation, a separate organization that holds U.S. Internal Revenue System 501(c)3 status.

CSU-ERFSA maintains liaison with the CSU Academic Senate, the California Faculty Association (CFA), the California State Employees Association (CSEA), the California State Coalition of Retired Employees (SCORE), and the Retired Public Employees Association of California (RPEA).

CSU-ERFSA publishes a quarterly newsletter, The Reporter, for its members, also available to the public through the CSU-ERFSA website.

== See also ==
- California State University
- California State Employees Association
- CalPERS
