= Sonoma State Observatory =

Observatory in California, US

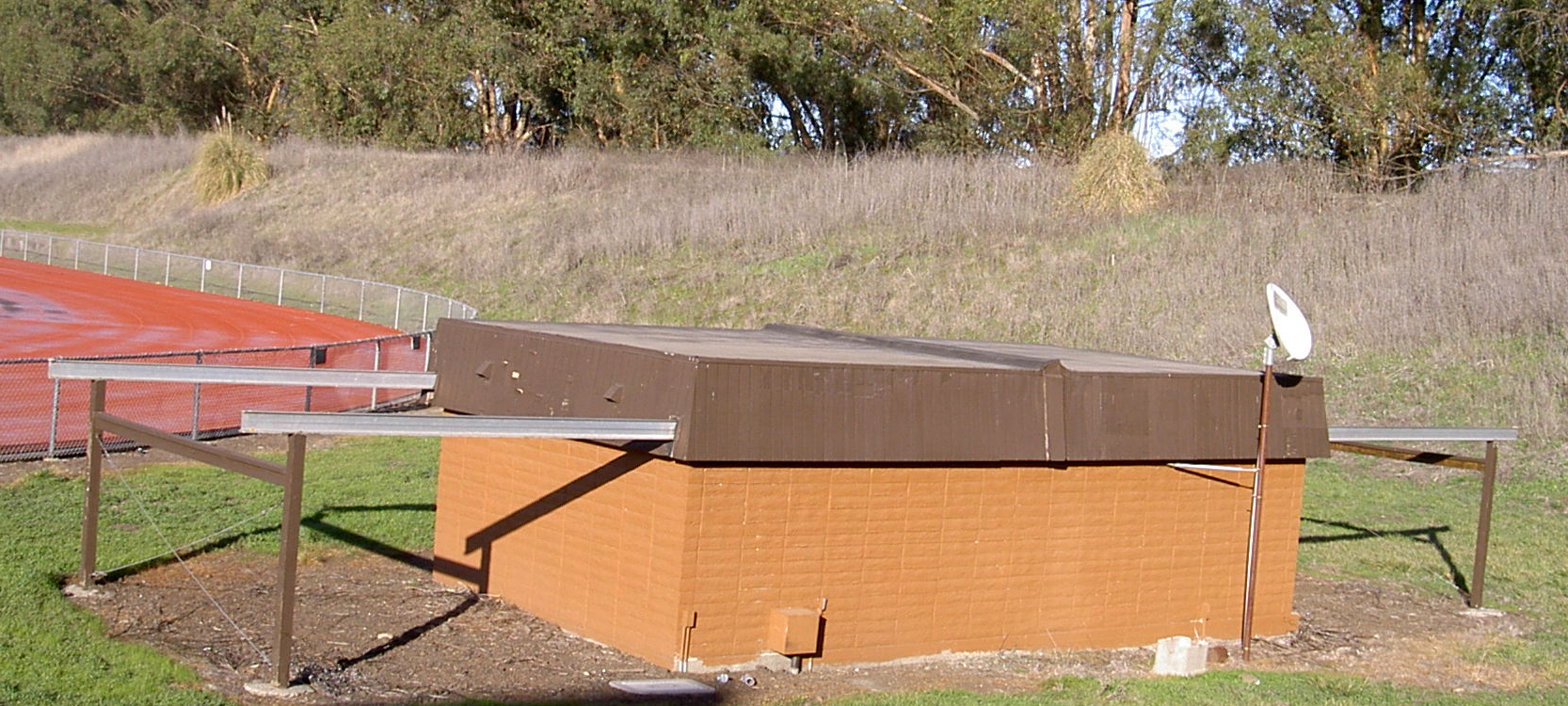
- The observatory building
- Organization: Sonoma State University
- Location: Sonoma State University
- Coordinates: 38°20′12″N 122°40′3″W
- Altitude: 53 m (174 ft)
- Website: phys-astro.sonoma.edu/…/campus-teaching-observatory

Telescopes
- Unnamed telescope: 14 in (0.36 m) reflector
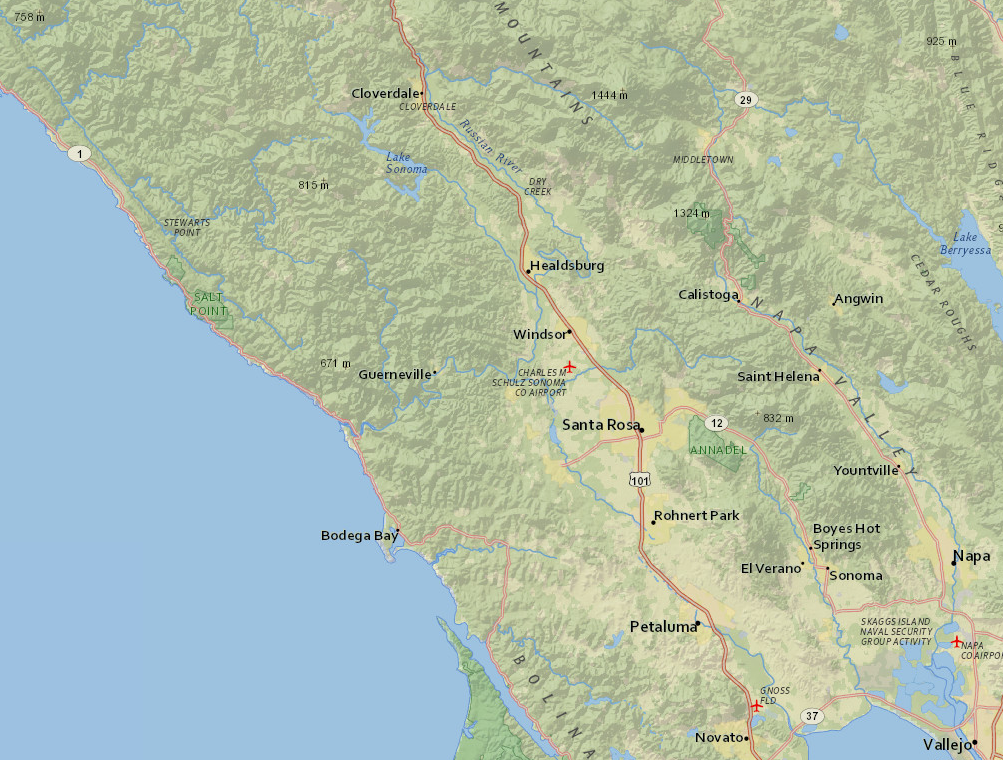
- Location within Sonoma County

Sonoma State Observatory is an astronomical observatory owned and operated by Sonoma State University. It is located in Rohnert Park, California.

== See also ==
- List of observatories
