= List of San Francisco State University people =

The following is a list of notable people associated with San Francisco State University, located in the American city of San Francisco, California. Many alumni may still need to be added to the San Francisco State University alumni category.

== Notable alumni ==
=== Academia ===
- Christopher R. Agnew, professor in the Department of Psychological Sciences at Purdue University
- Mahyar Amouzegar – mathematician, engineer, policy analyst, author, and academic
- Solomon Darwin – professor of Business at Haas School of Business and known for his development of "smart village" frameworks for Indian villages
- Roxanne Dunbar-Ortiz – professor emerita of Ethnic Studies at California State University, East Bay
- Israel Dunn Jr., president of Arkansas Baptist College
- Debra Fischer – astronomy professor, Yale University
- Lee Francis (1945–2003) – poet, educator, and founder of the Wordcraft Circle of Native Writers and Storytellers
- Gerta Keller – paleontologist, professor of Geosciences at Princeton University
- Sophie Molholm – neuroscientist and academic, Albert Einstein College of Medicine
- Nemesio Prudente (1927–2008) – president of the Polytechnic University of the Philippines

=== Art ===
- Opal Palmer Adisa (born 1954) – artist, writer
- Kim Anno (born 1958) – abstract painter, photographer, filmmaker, educator
- Lutz Bacher (1943–2019) – conceptual artist
- Debra Bloomfield – artist, photographer
- Sunny Buick (born 1970) – painter and tattoo artist
- Lenore Chinn (born 1949) – painter
- Honey Lee Cottrell (1946–2015) – photographer and filmmaker
- Roy De Forest (1930–2007) – painter and sculptor
- Victor De La Rosa (born c. 1970s) – textile artist and educator
- Dominic Di Mare (born 1932) – abstract sculptor and, fiber art
- Chris Enos (born 1944) – class of 1969, photographer
- Phoebe Gloeckner (born 1960) – visual artist and cartoonist
- Susannah Israel (born 1954) – sculptor, writer, and educator
- Suzanne Jackson (born 1944) – visual artist, poet, and dancer
- Elliott Linwood (born 1956) – conceptual artist
- Amalia Mesa-Bains – curator and artist
- Fred Rinne – visual and performance artist
- Hannah Stouffer (born 1981) – illustrator, painter
- Sam Tchakalian (1929–2004) – abstract painter and educator
- Annie Wells – Pulitzer Prize-winning photojournalist

=== Business ===
- Barnaby Dorfman – CEO of Foodista.com
- Greg Fischbach – Acclaim Entertainment
- Lars Fruergaard Jørgensen – CEO, Novo Nordisk
- Chris Larsen – founder of E-Loan and Ripple Labs
- George M. Marcus – real estate broker, founder of Marcus & Millichap
- Manny Mashouf – founder of bebe stores clothing retail shops
- Jayshree Ullal – president and CEO of Arista Networks
- Stephen Wolf – chairman of R.R. Donnelley & Sons Company

=== Entertainment ===
==== Film, stage, and television ====
- Alvin Ailey (1931–1989) – dance choreographer and activist
- Jack Angel – voice actor
- Gary Austin (1941–2017) – founder of the Groundlings theatre
- Margaret Avery – actress nominated for an Academy Award for The Color Purple; B.A. in education
- Ken Bastida – news anchor for KPIX
- Tory Belleci – special effects engineer and cast member on MythBusters
- Annette Bening – Academy Award-nominated actress, American Beauty, The American President, The Kids Are All Right
- Alex Borstein – actress on MadTV, voice of Lois on Family Guy
- Christopher Boyes – Academy Award-winning sound editor and mixer
- Bernard Bragg – actor
- Rachel Brice - dancer
- Stan Bunger – morning co-anchor at KCBS All News 740/FM 106.9
- Kari Byron – television host on MythBusters
- David Carradine (1936–2009) – actor
- Dana Carvey – comedian
- Peter Casey – Emmy Award-winning producer and writer, Frasier, Cheers, The Jeffersons, Wings
- Glen Charles – writer-producer
- Margaret Cho – comedian and actress
- Lisa Cholodenko – screenwriter and director
- Stephen Colletti – actor, One Tree Hill, Laguna Beach: The Real Orange County
- Peter Coyote – actor and author
- Robert Culp (1930–2010) – actor, I Spy, The Greatest American Hero, Everybody Loves Raymond
- Michael Curtis – Emmy Award-nominated producer and writer, Friends, JONAS
- Hari Dhillon – actor, Holby City, a British drama series
- Deepti Divakar – model, actress, writer, and Miss India World 1981
- Roger Dobkowitz – producer, The Price Is Right
- Walt Dohrn – actor, voice of Rumpelstiltskin in Shrek Forever After
- Arthur Dong – documentary filmmaker
- Keir Dullea – actor, best known for starring in 2001: A Space Odyssey
- Dina Eastwood – former television news anchor, star of Mrs. Eastwood & Company on E!; married to Clint Eastwood
- Andre Fenley – Academy Award-winning sound engineer at Skywalker Sound
- George Fenneman (1919–1997) – radio and television announcer
- Anthony C. Ferrante – director, producer and writer
- Keith Fowler – actor, director, educator
- Mike Galanos – news anchor for HLN
- Danny Glover – actor
- Nina Hartley – adult actress, author, feminist, activist
- Ellen Idelson (1961–2003) – television producer, writer and actress
- Sirena Irwin - voice actress
- Daren Kagasoff – actor
- Sammi Kane Kraft (1992–2012) – actress
- Lynn Hershman Leeson – artist and filmmaker
- Kimberly Hunt – chief anchor and managing editor for KGTV, San Diego
- Madeleine Lim – award-winning filmmaker, LGBTQ activist, and founder of QWOCMAP
- Delroy Lindo – actor
- Rosie Malek-Yonan – actor and author of The Crimson Field
- Mary Mara – actress
- Joseph E. Marshall, Jr. – radio talk show host
- Al Martinez (1929–2015) – Pulitzer Prize-winning journalist
- Irene McGee – talk show host, former cast member of The Real World: Seattle
- Mike McShane – actor, improvisational comedian
- Michael Medved – film critic and radio talk show host
- Michael Moss – Pulitzer Prize-winning journalist
- Shawn Murphy – Academy Award-winning sound editor
- Rex Navarette – comedian
- Melissa Ng – actress, first runner-up at Miss Chinese International Pageant 1996
- Steven Okazaki – documentary filmmaker
- Greg Proops – comedian and improviser best known for Whose Line is it Anyway?
- Jonas Rivera – Academy Award-winning producer of Inside Out
- Ronnie Schell – comedian and actor
- Rob Schneider – comedic actor
- Adivi Sesh –film actor, director, and screenwriter
- Ben Shedd – Academy Award-winning filmmaker
- Harry Shum, Jr. – actor, dancer, Glee
- Doug Siebum – audio engineer
- Frank Silva (1950–1995) – actor, Twin Peaks
- Frank Somerville – news anchor for KTVU Fox 2 in Oakland, California
- Daniel J. Sullivan – theatre director and playwright
- Rita Taggart – actress, Night Court
- Jeffrey Tambor – actor
- Ethan Van der Ryn – Academy Award-winning sound editor
- Janet Varney – actress, comedian
- Adrian Voo – actor
- David Wallechinsky – populist historian and television commentator
- Carl Weathers – actor, best known for starring in the Rocky films, Predator, and Happy Gilmore
- Josh Wolf – freelance journalist and internet videoblogger
- B.D. Wong – actor
- Steven Zaillian – Academy Award-winning screenwriter; wrote screenplay for Schindler's List

==== Music ====
- Annette A. Aguilar – percussionist, bandleader, and music educator
- Vernon Alley (1915–2004) – jazz bassist
- Mike Burkett – lead singer of NOFX
- Dan the Automator – hip-hop producer
- Vernon Chatman – member of art collective/rock band PFFR, co-creator of Wonder Showzen and Xavier
- Paul Desmond (1924–1977) – jazz musician, member of The Dave Brubeck Quartet and composer of "Take Five"
- George Duke (1946–2013) – musician and producer
- Don Falcone – musician and producer
- Jennifer Finch – bass player for the rock band L7
- Paul Gemignani – Broadway musical director
- Noah Georgeson – musician and producer
- Vince Guaraldi (1928–1976) – jazz musician and composer of the Peanuts cartoon music
- Kirk Hammett – Metallica's lead guitarist
- Dan Hicks (1941–2016) – musician, member of The Charlatans, leader of Dan Hicks and His Hot Licks
- Ella Jenkins – folk singer
- John Lee – member of art collective/rock band PFFR, co-creator of Wonder Showzen and Xavier
- Chandler Leighton - singer songwriter
- Johnny Mathis – singer
- Dean Menta – composer, guitarist for Faith No More and Sparks
- Steven Miller – producer, arranger, and record company executive
- Kent Nagano – conductor
- Pauline Oliveros (1932–2016) – composer, accordionist and electronic art musician
- John Patitucci – jazz double bass and jazz fusion electric bass player
- Terry Riley – composer
- Pete Rugolo (1915–2011) – jazz composer, arranger and record producer
- Ghazi Shami – record producer and music technologist, founder & CEO of Empire Distribution
- Cal Tjader (1925–1982) – jazz musician
- Oliver Tree – surrealist musician, singer, songwriter, comedian, and filmmaker
- Joe Louis Walker – electric blues guitarist, singer, songwriter and producer
- Janet Weiss – drummer for Sleater-Kinney

=== Literature and journalism ===
- Oscar Zeta Acosta – writer, activist, attorney
- Kim Addonizio – poet and novelist
- Amy L. Alexander – author; journalist for The Washington Post, NPR, The Root, and The Nation, as well as many newspapers
- Rae Armantrout – Pulitzer Prize-winning poet
- Mark Arnold – self-published author
- Melba Pattillo Beals – author, journalist, academic and member of the Little Rock Nine
- Po Bronson – journalist and author
- James Brown – novelist
- Howard Bryant – senior writer for ESPN.com and ESPN The Magazine
- Patrick Califia – writer and poet
- Laban Coblentz – writer, educator, science policy adviser, international civil servant, entrepreneur
- Adam Cornford – poet, librettist, and essayist
- Kelly Corrigan – writer
- Jane Cutler – writer
- David Farley – author of An Irreverent Curiosity, food and travel writer
- Ben Fong-Torres – writer, editor of Rolling Stone
- Ernest J. Gaines – novelist, National Humanities Medal winner, The Autobiography of Miss Jane Pittman
- Leonard Gardner – novelist
- Jack Gilbert (1925–2012) – poet
- Eugene Gloria – poet
- Linda Gregg – poet
- Gerald Haslam – novelist, essayist, writer, public speaker
- Jonathan Holden – poet
- Aidan A. Kelly – poet, academic, and influential figure in the Neopagan religion of Wicca
- Bill Lee – author
- Russell Leong – author and philosopher
- Devorah Major – writer
- Frances Mayes – poet, memoirist, essayist, novelist
- Michael McClure – poet, playwright, songwriter, and novelist
- Richard Melo – writer, author of Jokerman 8, a novel set at San Francisco State University
- Alyce Miller – writer
- Janice Mirikitani – poet and activist
- Cherríe Moraga – writer and activist
- Carol Muske-Dukes – former California Poet Laureate
- Jim Provenzano – novelist and journalist
- Anne Rice – writer
- John Saul – horror novelist
- Kathy Lou Schultz – poet, scholar
- Philip Schultz – Pulitzer Prize-winning author
- Ron Silliman – poet
- Daniel Silva – journalist and novelist
- Kate Small – writer
- Rebecca Solnit – writer, contributing editor at Harper's Magazine
- Chad Sweeney – poet
- Gail Tsukiyama – novelist
- Jose Antonio Vargas – Pulitzer Prize-winning journalist
- Rickey Vincent – author and Ethnic Studies professor
- Rishi Vohra – novelist
- Vivian Walsh – writer, Olive, the Other Reindeer and other children's books
- Shawn Wong – author and English professor
- Kirby Wright – writer
- Judy Juanita – poet and novelist

=== Military ===
- Herman Bottcher (1909–1944) – decorated U.S. Army soldier, veteran of the Spanish Civil War and World War II
- Barbara Brannon – major general, United States Air Force
- Roscoe Cartwright (1919–1974) – first black field artilleryman promoted to brigadier general
- Darlene Iskra – first woman to command a U.S. Navy ship
- Keith Kerr – military general and gay rights activist

=== Politics and government ===
- Tom Ammiano – member of the California State Assembly (13th district)
- Willie Brown – member and 58th Speaker of the California State Assembly and former mayor of San Francisco, California
- John L. Burton – former president pro tempore of the California State Senate
- Robert Campbell – member of the California State Assembly (1980–1996)
- Ron Dellums (1935–2018) – former mayor of Oakland and U.S. representative 1971–1998
- Saeb Erekat – chief of the PLO Steering and Monitoring Committee
- Heather Fong – former chief of police, San Francisco Police Department
- Larry Galizio – member of the Oregon House of Representatives
- Stephen Gaskin (1935–2014) – a Green Party presidential primary candidate, political activist, and philanthropic organizer
- Mike Gierau – member of the Wyoming Senate
- Patsy Jo Hilliard – educator and former mayor of East Point, Georgia
- Ed Jew – politician
- Cleve Jones – AIDS and LGBT rights activist
- Fred H. Lau – former chief of police, San Francisco Police Department
- Nicole LeFavour – Idaho state senator
- Wilma Mankiller (1945–2010) – first woman elected to serve as chief of the Cherokee Nation
- John Márquez – politician
- George Miller – U.S. congressman, 1975–2015
- Richard Oakes (1942–1972) – Native American activist
- William Wayne Paul (1939–1989) – political activist and martial artist
- Pierre Salinger (1925–2004) – White House press secretary for JFK and LBJ
- Harpreet Sandhu – Richmond, California politician and Sikh community leader
- Mario Savio (1942–1996) – political activist, key member in the Berkeley Free Speech Movement
- David Schuman – judge of the Oregon Court of Appeals
- Mu Sochua – Cambodian member of Parliament and women's rights activist
- Bill Thomas – former congressman and chairman of the House Ways and Means Committee
- Leland Yee – California state senator
- Mohammad Javad Zarif – Iranian Foreign Minister

=== Science, technology, and medicine ===
- R. Paul Butler – astronomer; staff scientist at the Carnegie Institution for Science
- Yvonne Cagle – NASA astronaut
- Douglas Crockford – programmer, specifier of JSON, JavaScript language developer
- Hillman Curtis (1961–2012) – pioneering web designer
- Jaime Levy – interface designer and user experience strategist
- Gilman Louie – technologist, game designer; former CEO of Spectrum HoloByte, Inc., In-Q-Tel
- Stanley Mazor – co-inventor of the microprocessor
- Alison Murray – biochemist and Antarctic researcher
- Dan Werthimer – co-founder and chief scientist of SETI@home
- Joseph White (1932–2017) – psychologist, "godfather of Black psychology"

=== Sports ===
- Kevin Anderson – athletic director for the University of Maryland, College Park
- Billy Baird – New York Jets player (1963–1969) and coach (1981–1984)
- Bebe Bryans – United States and Olympic head coach in women's rowing
- Ken Carter – education activist and former high school basketball coach
- Paul Cayard – professional sailor
- Elmer Collett – NFL player, 1967–1977
- Ali Dia – professional soccer player
- Pete Dominguez – assistant coach for Milwaukee Bucks of NBA
- Frank Duncan – NFL player, 1979–1981
- Maury Duncan – NFL and CFL player, 1954–1958
- Esmé Emmanuel (born 1947) – South African tennis player
- Tommy Harper – MLB player, 1962–1976
- Bud Harrelson – MLB player, 1965–1980
- Mike Holmgren – SFSU football coach; later NFL coach and executive, 1986–2012
- Joe Jackson – American football player
- Carl Kammerer – NFL player, 1961–1969
- Gilbert Melendez – professional mixed martial artist, former World Extreme Cagefighting and Strikeforce Lightweight Champion, UFC lightweight contender
- Floyd Peters (1936–2008) – NFL player (1958–1970) and coach (1974–1996)
- Jake Shields – professional mixed martial artist, former Strikeforce Middleweight Champion, and formerly competing for the UFC
- Jim Sochor (1938–2015) – football player and coach
- Jesse Taylor (attended) – wrestler, mixed martial arts fighter
- Bob Toledo – football player and coach

=== Other ===
- Vester Lee Flanagan II (1973–2015) – gunman in the deaths of two U.S. journalists
- Eva Galperin – director of cybersecurity at the Electronic Frontier Foundation
- Chandra Levy (1977–2001) – intern; murdered in 2001 in Washington, D.C.
- Ruth B. Love – former superintendent of the Oakland Unified School District and Chicago Public Schools
- Marianne O'Grady – deputy country director Afghanistan with Care International, during Fall of Kabul (2021)
- James Van Praagh – self-proclaimed medium, recipient of the 2012 Pigasus Award in the category "Refusal to face reality"
- Alice Fong Yu (1905–2000) – first Chinese American public school teacher in California

== Notable current and past faculty ==
=== Ethnic studies faculty ===
- Rabab Abdulhadi (born 1955), Palestinian-born American scholar, activist, editor, and an academic director, associate professor of ethnic studies, race and resistance studies, and the founding director of Arab and Muslim ethnicities and diasporas studies (AMED)
- Wilmette Brown (born 1946), writer, teacher in SFSU's first Black studies department
- Jeffery Paul Chan (1942–2022), professor of Asian American studies and English
- Angela Davis (born 1944), professor of ethnic studies, political activist
- Marc Dollinger (born 1964), professor of Jewish studies
- Nathan Hare (1933–2024), sociologist, psychologist, first coordinator of Black studies, founding publisher of The Black Scholar
- Eric Mar (born 1962), lecturer on Asian American Studies, politician, member of the San Francisco Board of Supervisors
- Askia M. Touré (born 1938), poet, and activist associated with the Black Arts Movement, professor in the Africana studies program

=== Fine art faculty ===
- Whitney Chadwick (born 1943), art historian, writer
- Victor De La Rosa, class of 1999, professor of fine art; first Latino to head a department at SFSU
- Lewis deSoto (born 1954), Native American conceptual artist
- Stephen De Staebler (1933–2011), sculptor, printmaker
- Imogene Gieling (1923–2024) metalsmith, educator, and jewelry designer, taught from 1965 until 1990
- John Gutmann (1905–1998), photographer, painter
- Milton Halberstadt (1919–2000), photographer, artist
- Marie Johnson-Calloway (1920–2018), painter of Black portraiture, mixed media artist
- David Kuraoka (born 1946), ceramicist, sculptor
- Richard G. Mann (born 1949), art historian, known for Spanish art history, taught from 1991 to 2017
- Nick Sousanis, cartoonist, art critic
- Sylvia Solochek Walters (born 1938) professor emeritus of art, collagist, painter, and printmaker
- Don Worth (1924–2009), professor emeritus of art, photographer

=== Film faculty ===
- Craig Abaya, digital media artist, filmmaker, photographer, musician, songwriter
- Zita Cabello-Barrueto (born 1946), filmmaker, professor, activist
- Larry Clark (born 1948) member of L.A. Rebellion School of Black Filmmakers
- August Coppola (1936–2009), film executive, dean of Creative Arts
- Jan Millsapps (born 1950), writer, filmmaker, professor emerita in the cinema department
- Joseph McBride (born 1947), journalist, author and film historian, professor in the cinema department
- Bill Nichols, film critic and historian, professor emeritus in the cinema department
- Irving Saraf (1932–2012), Academy Award-winning film director and film producer, former professor of film production

=== Humanities faculty ===
- Herbert Blau (1926–2013), theater director, co-director of the San Francisco Actor's Workshop, 1953–1965
- Philip Choy (1926–2017), historian
- Vartan Gregorian – former history professor, president of Carnegie Corporation of New York
- Jules Irving (1925–1979), actor, director, co-director of the San Francisco Actors' Workshop, 1953–1965, and artistic director of the Repertory Company of Lincoln Center, NYC
- Catherine Kudlick – professor of history, director of the Paul K. Longmore Institute on Disability
- Sandra Lee McKay (born 1945), linguist
- Jacob Needleman – philosopher of religion
- Charles Postel – historian of Populism in the United States, the Gilded Age and Progressive Era, and African-American history
- Moses Rischin – historian
- Theodore Roszak (1933–2011), historian, author of The Making of a Counter Culture
- Anita Silvers – (1940–2019), philosopher of science, disability rights activist
- Marc Stein – historian of LGBTQ history in the United States, sexuality, constitutional law, and social movements
- Amy Sueyoshi – historian of sexuality, gender, and race at the College of Ethnic Studies
- Bas van Fraassen (born 1941), philosopher of science, distinguished professor of philosophy at SFSU, fellow of the British Academy, and fellow of the American Academy of Arts and Sciences

=== Journalism faculty ===
- Sachi Cunningham – PBS Frontline/world producer and director of photography, Los Angeles Times video journalist, journalism professor
- Roland De Wolk – journalist, Pulitzer Prize winner
- Dave McElhatton (1928–2010), journalist, evening news anchor

=== Literature and poetry faculty ===
- Kim Addonizio (born 1954), poet, novelist
- Walter Van Tilburg Clark – founder of the Creative Writing program; author of The Ox-Bow Incident
- Gloria Frym – poet, fiction writer, and essayist
- Sally Miller Gearhart – feminist, science fiction writer, and political activist
- Paul Hoover (born 1946), poet
- Persis Karim (born 1962), poet, editor, professor of comparative literature, the Neda Nobari Distinguished Chair and director of the Center for Iranian Diaspora Studies
- Michael Krasny (born 1944), professor of English, radio talk show host
- Wright Morris (1910–1998), novelist and photographer, professor of English from 1962–1975
- Alejandro Murguía (born 1949), poet, short story writer, editor, San Francisco Poet Laureate in 2012
- Pete Najarian (born 1940) novelist, short story, and nonfiction writer, also a painter and sculptor
- Peter Orner, novelist, essayist
- Stan Rice (1942–2002), poet, professor of English and creative writing
- Stephen Rodefer (1940–2015), poet, painter
- Carol Lee Sanchez (1934–2014), Native American poet, visual artist, essayist
- James Schevill (1920–2009), poet, critic, and playwright

=== Music faculty ===
- Richard Festinger – composer
- Bennett Friedman – musician, saxophonist
- John Handy – jazz musician
- Roger Nixon (1921–2009) – composer, musician
- Wayne Peterson – pianist, composer, Pulitzer Prize winner
- Carlos Sanchez-Gutierrez (1964–), composer
- Doug Siebum – professional audio engineer
- Roger Woodward (born 1942), pianist

=== Science and math faculty ===
- Sheldon Axler (born 1949), mathematician
- Richard Dugdale – oceanographer and fellow of the American Association for the Advancement of Science
- Ralf Hotchkiss – Distinguished Research Scientist in the Department of Engineering
- Dean H. Kenyon – professor emeritus of Biology, author of Of Pandas and People, one of the main proponents of intelligent design
- Bruce A. Manning – professor of chemistry and biochemistry
- Geoff Marcy – astronomer, discoverer of more than 150 extrasolar planets

=== Social science faculty ===
- John Collier Jr. (1913–1992), anthropologist
- John Keith Irwin (1929–2010), professor of sociology
- Russell Jeung – professor of sociology, co-founder of Stop AAPI Hate
- Luis Kemnitzer (1928–2006), anthropologist, political activist
- David Matsumoto – psychologist
- Mahmood Monshipouri (born 1952), Iranian-born professor of international relations, scholar, author

=== Other faculty ===
- Vic Rowen (1919–2013), football player and coach
- Carleton Washburne (1889–1968), author and educational reformer

== Presidents ==
- Frederic Lister Burk (1899–1924)
- Archibald B. Anderson (1924–1927)
- Mary A. Ward (Acting President, 1927)
- Alexander C. Roberts (1927–1945)
- J. Paul Leonard (1945–1957)
- Glenn Dumke (1957–1961)
- Frank L. Fenton (1961–1962)
- Paul A. Dodd (1962–1965)
- Stanley F. Paulson (1965–1966)
- John Summerskill (1966–1968)
- Robert R. Smith (1968)
- S. I. Hayakawa (1968–1973)
- Paul F. Romberg (1973–1983)
- Chia-Wei Woo (1983–1988)
- Robert A. Corrigan (1988–2012)
- Leslie Wong (2012–2019)
- Lynn Mahoney (2019–present)
