= List of California State University, Fresno people =

California State University, Fresno has numerous notable alumni, faculty, and presidents.

== Notable alumni ==
- Armen A. Alchian – professor emeritus, founder of the "UCLA Tradition" in Economics
- Marvin Baxter – justice, California Supreme Court
- Todd Beamer – victim of the September 11 attacks (passenger aboard United Airlines Flight 93)
- Robert Beltran – actor, Star Trek
- Robert Alan Beuth – actor, playwright, sculptor
- Lee P. Brown – former mayor of Houston, former New York police commissioner
- Cruz Bustamante – California lieutenant governor
- Daniel Chacón – university professor, acclaimed essayist, playwright, and fiction writer
- Lori Chavez-DeRemer – U.S. secretary of labor, former U.S. representative from Oregon
- John Christy – director of the Earth System Science Center at the University of Alabama in Huntsville
- Zinzi Coogler – Oscar-nominated film producer
- Noreen Corcoran – actress
- Jim Costa – U.S. representative, former California State Assembly member
- Joseph Crowley – president emeritus, University of Nevada
- Ed Diener – professor and psychologist studying subjective well-being
- William Everson – poet (did not graduate)
- Geoffrey Gamble – president, Montana State University
- Kenny Guinn – governor of Nevada
- John Harlan – game show announcer
- Brandi Hitt – Los Angeles-based news anchor
- Rick Husband – mission commander, shuttle Columbia, STS-107, 2003
- Raymond Ibrahim – Coptic-American author and commentator
- Robert A. Jensen – writer and crisis management expert
- Bill Jones – former California secretary of state
- Dot Marie Jones – actress
- Emily Kuroda – actress
- Brad Lewis – producer of Ratatouille
- Janet Nichols Lynch – author
- Ronald Markarian – major general of the United States Air Force and the California state director of the U.S. Selective Service System
- Manny Mashouf – chairman and chief executive officer, bebe stores
- Steven Nagel – NASA astronaut
- Thomas Nixon – author
- Joe Odagiri – Japanese actor
- Paul O'Neill – former U.S. secretary of the treasury, CEO of Alcoa Corporation
- Sam Peckinpah – film director
- Charles Poochigian – California state senator
- Lyle Setencich – former Boise State Broncos head football coach, former Texas Tech Red Raiders football defensive coordinator
- Daniel Silva – author
- Gary Soto – poet, essayist, and fiction writer
- Joyce Sumbi – librarian in the Los Angeles County Library system
- Sherley Anne Williams – author, National Book Award nominee, Emmy Award winner
- Mick Wingert – voice actor
- Kou Yang – one of the first Hmong people to earn a doctorate and become a university professor
- Brett Young – country music artist

=== Notable athletes ===
- Stephen Abas – Olympic silver medalist, freestyle wrestling (2004); three-time NCAA champion
- Davante Adams – wide receiver for the Los Angeles Rams
- Courtney Alexander – former NBA player
- Rafer Alston – former NBA point guard, And1/New York City streetball legend Skip to my Lou
- Jahine Arnold – former NFL wide receiver
- Stephen Baker – former NFL wide receiver
- Desi Barmore – American-Israeli basketball player
- Laura Berg – three-time Olympic gold-medalist, USA Softball
- Bernard Berrian – former NFL wide receiver, Minnesota Vikings; played in Super Bowl XLI with the Chicago Bears
- Sonny Bishop – former AFL offensive lineman
- DaRon Bland – NFL cornerback
- Reggie Brown – former NFL fullback
- David Carr – former college quarterback for Fresno State Bulldogs football (1997-2001), former NFL quarterback, 1st overall draft pick in the 2002 NFL draft by the Houston Texans (2002-2006), Carolina Panthers (2007), New York Giants (2008-2009), San Francisco 49ers (2010), New York Giants (2011-2012), Coaching for Bakersfield Christian High School (2015-present) coach is Offensive coordinator for the high school football team.
- Derek Carr (Class of 2013) – Former college football player for Fresno State Bulldogs football (2009-2013), former quarterback for National Football League Oakland Raiders quarterback (2014-2022) and former quarterback, New Orleans Saints (2023-2024), and Currently Special Advisor form UCLA Bruins football (2026-present)
- Duane Carter – former Indianapolis 500 racer
- Haley Cavinder – former Bulldogs women's basketball player; internet personality; transferred to the University of Miami in 2022
- Hanna Cavinder – former Bulldogs women's basketball player; internet personality; transferred to the University of Miami in 2022
- Ron Cox – former NFL linebacker (Chicago Bears, Green Bay Packers), NCAA sacks leader
- Aaron Craver – former NFL fullback
- Tyrone Culver – former NFL safety, Green Bay Packers
- Trent Dilfer – former NFL quarterback and Super Bowl-champion quarterback as member of the Baltimore Ravens
- Pat Doyle – baseball coach
- Henry Ellard – former NFL wide receiver
- Melvin Ely – former NBA forward-center, two-time WAC Player of the Year (2001–2002)
- John Erickson – Canadian PGA Tour winner, 1991 Windsor Charity Classic, 1985 PCAA Conference Champion (FSU 1981–1986)
- Noel Felix – former NBA player, NBDL player, Anaheim Arsenal
- Doug Fister – former MLB pitcher
- Vernon Fox – former NFL safety, Denver Broncos
- Jethro Franklin – NFL assistant coach, Houston Texans, former NFL player
- Hiram Fuller – former NBA player
- Mark Gardner – former MLB pitcher, current bullpen coach, San Francisco Giants
- Augie Garrido – University of Texas baseball coach
- Matt Garza – former MLB pitcher
- A. J. Gass – former CFL linebacker
- Paul George – NBA player, Philadelphia 76ers
- Dan Gladden – former MLB outfielder
- Tom Goodwin – former MLB outfielder, former NCAA steals leader
- Nate Grimes (born 1996) – basketball player in the Israeli Basketball Premier League
- Cory Hall – former NFL safety
- Brandon Halsey – wrestler; professional mixed martial artist
- Jamey Harris – 1998 USA track & field national champion in men's 1500 meter and sub-4 minute miler
- Gary Hayes – former NFL defensive back
- Chris Herren – former NBA player
- Rod Higgins – general manager, Golden State Warriors
- Josh Hokit – mixed martial artist
- Orlando Huff – former NFL linebacker
- Ervin Hunt – former NFL defensive back
- Chris Jefferies – former NBA player, Argentine national league player, Club Sportivo Ben Hur
- Adam Jennings – former NFL wide receiver, Detroit Lions
- Tyler Johnson – current assistant coach, Fresno State Bulldogs (2025–present); former NBA player, Sioux Falls Skyforce (2014–2015); former NBA player, Miami Heat (2015–2019), Phoenix Suns (2019–2020), Brooklyn Nets (2020–2021), Philadelphia 76ers (2021–2022), San Antonio Spurs (2022), Brisbane Bullets (2022–2023)
- Bobby Jones – former MLB pitcher, 1991 NCAA Player of the Year
- Charlie Jones – former NFL wide receiver
- Tommy Jones – former gridiron football player
- Aaron Judge – current MLB outfielder, New York Yankees (2016–present)
- Lane Kiffin – current head coach at LSU Tigers football (2026–present) ,former head football coach at Ole Miss (2020–2025), former Volunteers head coach (2009), former Oakland Raiders head coach (2007–2008), former Trojans head coach (2010–2013) and assistant coach (2001 TE) (2002–2003 WR) (2004 PGC/WR) (2005–2006 OC/WR), former Bulldogs quarterback (1994–1996), and he was the quarterback for Fresno State Bulldogs football from (1994-1996).
- Herman A. Lawson – highly decorated U.S. Army Air Force/U.S. Air Force officer, combat fighter pilot with the Tuskegee Airmen, former Sacramento, California city councilman; first African-American to play football all four years at Fresno
- Louis Leonard – former NFL defensive tackle, Cleveland Browns
- Tito Maddox – former NBA player
- Logan Mankins – former NFL offensive lineman, New England Patriots (first-round draft pick 2005)
- Dante Marsh – former CFL cornerback, BC Lions
- Richard Marshall – NFL cornerback, Carolina Panthers
- Mike Martz – former NFL head coach, St. Louis Rams
- Ryan Mathews – 2010 NFL draft, first-round selection, 12th overall pick, NFL running back, Philadelphia Eagles
- Marcus McCauley – former NFL cornerback, Minnesota Vikings
- Casey McGehee – former MLB infielder
- Dominic McGuire – NBA player, Charlotte Bobcats
- Garrett McIntyre – former NFL linebacker
- Mike Moffitt – former NFL tight end
- Lorenzo Neal – former NFL fullback, three-time Pro Bowler
- Tom Neville – former NFL guard
- Damacio Page – Bulldog wrestler; professional mixed martial artist, formerly for the WEC and the UFC
- Stephone Paige – former NFL wide receiver
- Terry Pendleton – former MLB third baseman, 1991 National League MVP Atlanta Braves
- Michael Pittman – former NFL running back
- Marquez Pope – former NFL defensive back
- Ron Rivers – former NFL running back
- Terrance Roberson – former Euroleague basketball player
- Bryan Robinson – NFL defensive end, Cincinnati Bengals
- Orlando Robinson – NBA player
- James Sanders – NFL safety, New England Patriots
- Shanon Slack – former Bulldog wrestler, current mixed martial artist fighting for Bellator
- Stephen Spach – NFL tight end, Arizona Cardinals
- Michael Stewart – former NFL safety
- Omar Stoutmire – former NFL safety
- Kevin Sutherland – PGA Tour golfer, won 2002 WGC-Accenture Match Play Championship
- Kevin Sweeney – former NCAA record-setter in career passing yards and former NFL quarterback
- Jerry Tarkanian – legendary, controversial basketball coach (Fresno State, UNLV, San Antonio Spurs), won NCAA basketball title as head coach at UNLV
- Deshon Taylor (born 1996), basketball player for Hapoel Haifa of the Israeli Basketball Premier League
- Jeff Tedford – offensive coordinator, Tampa Bay Buccaneers
- Lavale Thomas – former NFL running back
- Billy Volek – former NFL quarterback, San Diego Chargers
- Steve Wapnick – former Major League Baseball pitcher
- Derrick Ward – former NFL running back, Tampa Bay Buccaneers
- Taylor Ward – MLB outfielder, Los Angeles Angels
- Cornelius Warmerdam – former pole vault world record holder
- Anthony Washington – former NFL cornerback
- Charles Washington – NFL safety
- Tim Washington – former NFL defensive back
- Nick Watney – PGA Tour golfer, NCAA All-American, and 2007 Zurich New Orleans champion
- Jeff Weaver – former MLB pitcher
- Chastin West – former NFL wide receiver, Green Bay Packers
- James Williams – former NFL defensive back
- Jimy Williams – former manager of three Major League Baseball teams
- Paul Williams – former NFL wide receiver, Tennessee Titans
- Sam Williams – former NFL linebacker, Oakland Raiders
- Justin Wilson – MLB pitcher
- Tydus Winans – former NFL wide receiver
- Cameron Worrell – former NFL safety
- Dwayne Wright – former NFL running back
- Rodney Bernard Wright, Jr. – former Arena Football League wide receiver, currently on San Francisco 49ers practice squad
- Austin Wynns – baseball catcher for the San Francisco Giants

== Notable faculty and staff ==
- Cynthia Doerner (born 1951) – Australian tennis player and coach
- Lillian Faderman, MFA– English professor emeritus, acclaimed author
- Victor Davis Hanson – founder of Classics Department; historian, essayist, columnist and television personality; author of Mexifornia and Carnage and Culture
- Juan Felipe Herrera – Chicano and Latin American Studies; current creative writing professor at University of California, Riverside; Poet Laureate of the United States
- Lloyd Ingles – zoologist; fellow of the American Association for the Advancement of Science
- W. Hudson Kensel – historian of the American West
- Philip Levine – English; widely known poet and Pulitzer Prize winner, former Poet Laureate of the United States (deceased)
- Roger Mahony – social work, Roman Catholic cardinal and archbishop of Los Angeles
- Francine Oputa – Cross-Cultural and Gender Center; leading expert in diversity and inclusion in education.
- Juan Serrano – head of guitar department, flamenco guitarist, helped to form guitar program
- Roger Tatarian – journalism; editor-in-chief, United Press International (deceased)
