= Monshipour =

Monshipour (Persian: منشی‌پور) is an Iranian surname. Notable people with the surname include:

- Mahyar Monshipour (born 1975), Iranian-born French boxer
- Mahmood Monshipouri (born 1952), Iranian-born American scholar, author, educator
- Tina Monshipour Foster, Iranian-American lawyer
