= Monah Li =

American fashion designer

Monah Li is a Viennese-born, Los Angeles-based fashion designer, best known for her feminine, deconstructed clothes. She is credited by numerous fashion writers with popularizing the post-modern Bohemian chic look and with starting the trend of up-cycling and re-purposing vintage dresses, sweaters and slips.

Her dresses, cashmere sweaters and skirts have been featured in People Magazine, The Los Angeles Times, and Los Angeles Magazine, and "worn by celebrities such Christina Ricci, Salma Hayek, Nicole Kidman and Ione Skye." Other stars who have worn her clothes include Courtney Love, Cameron Diaz, Stevie Nicks, Salma Hayek, Barbra Streisand, Gina Gershon, Liv Tyler, Goldie Hawn, Jada Pinkett Smith and Madonna. She also designed Alyssa Milano's wedding dress.

Monah Li's clothes appeared on Friends and the original Beverly Hills, 90210 where they were referred to by the designer's name; and in the films Practical Magic, Sugar Town and Never Been Kissed. She has designed for bebe stores as both as the head designer in the Los Angeles office, and as a freelance designer. Her own labels include Monah Li, Monah Li Couture and Monahmour.

Monah Li recently opened her own eponymous boutique in Elysian Park, an area of Los Angeles between Hollywood and Downtown undergoing gentrification, a follow-up of the successful boutique she opened in the buddingly hip Los Feliz area in 1998.

Monah Li's romantic, eclectic silhouettes are designed to be worn by women of all sizes. She increasingly favors "normal" and larger-sized models, as well as real women, over traditionally thin, professional fashion models in her shows. Her use of over-dyed silk, velvet and satin with lace insets, called the "rich Bohemian look" have made her one of the most knocked-off designers in her genre. In December 1999 she received a settlement from Italian designer Patty Shelabarger, who had offered to represent Li's line in Europe,"removed the labels from Li's clothing and sewed in her own."

In addition to designing clothes, Monah Li is a published author and has written a screenplay that is in pre-production. Her essay, "The Making of a Designer" appeared in the LA Weekly on April 10, 2003, and she is a frequent contributor to The Huffington Post, writing about fashion, and more recently her recovery from nineteen years of bulimia. She contributed a story to Love Addict: Sex, Romance, and Other Dangerous Drugs; her screenplay, Fashion Slaves, begins production in fall, 2011 with independent film house BlancBiehn Productions.

== Career ==
Monah Li began her career as a teenager making her own clothes in Vienna. Her dresses attracted attention and were bought by boutiques in her hometown and in Düsseldorf, Germany. One of the only female students to have attended the prestigious Higher Teaching Institute Industries in Austria, she graduated from textile engineering school with honors at age nineteen.

Though accepted into Karl Lagerfeld's class at the Academy for Applied Art in Vienna, Li chose to pursue her career after her hand painted silk garments received a write up in German Vogue, before moving to Los Angeles where her psychiatrist mother was living to attend the Fashion Institute of Design & Merchandising. After a brief stint in Los Angeles where her growing drug use distracted her from school, Monah Li returned to Vienna, where she was hospitalized for addiction. As part of her rehab program, she went to work in a garment shop owned by the rehab's head of psychiatry, learning "couture' from the seamstresses who also worked there. After leaving the rehab program, she opened her own boutique in Vienna, winning the Best Designer of 1988 Award from the Austrian Wool Secretary.

Monah Li then returned to Los Angeles, and after her first successful dress design was knocked off, founded her own company and began to create unique, one of-a-kind hand sewn garments, up-cycling vintage slips, dress and sweaters with lace insets, lingerie fastening and straps, which she then over-dyed. Finding success through sales to trend-setting retailers like Fred Segal, she opened a boutique on Vermont Avenues, which stocked her signature X-dress and other styles. The shop was described as one of "the best new stores in the city," and was credited with turning Vermont Avenue, the main street in the Los Feliz district of Los Angeles, into a hip shopping destination. She rallied a group of other local designers and founded the Coalition of Los Angeles Designers in 1998; the group is now defunct, but while active, staged fashion shows and worked to bring awareness about innovative Los Angeles clothing to a wider audience.

In 1998 Monah Li was nominated as California Mart Rising Star. In 2000, Monah Li added perfume she designed and created to her boutique, and branched out into large scale manufacturing of her designs for department stores. Unfortunately, a production contractor "did such shoddy work that stores nationwide returned the merchandise," costing her business $800,000 in two months. Despite the setback, she put together a fashion show for New York in Spring 2000, where reps from Bebe saw her designs and immediately hired her as head designer for their newly created Los Angeles office.

Bebe CEO and founder Manny Mashouf told the Los Angeles Times, "Her dresses are highly designed in terms of seams and details. They're sexy and feminine and have a fluid motion." Fashion writer Lauri Pike said of Monah Li's hiring, "It's a great matchup in a lot of ways. I think of those [Bebe] clothes as being a little too young and slutty. But if Monah Li designs for them, I'm going to watch it. If they want to pull ahead of their competition or appeal to slightly older women, Monah Li could be very helpful."

Monah Li eventually left bebe to restart her own label. She showed at Los Angeles Fashion Week in 2003, and returned in 2004 with a "dramatically reinvented look" featuring richly colored solids and fur stoles which was called "one of the most visually stimulating and breathtaking shows of the week."

Monah Li then started a partnership with a manufacturing company, but there were disagreements. The business ended in 2007. Monah Li shifted her career goals from fashion, taking writing classes at UCLA and completing a certificate program in alcohol and drug counseling, while assisting her longtime boyfriend who was working on his third novel. During her hiatus from designing, she recovered from nineteen years of bulimia, with the support of friends and her newly discovered interest in belly dancing. In 2008, she and her author/screenwriter boyfriend were married. After their divorce in 2010 and the completion of her counseling internships, Monah Li returned to designing, with a fashion show featuring her classic looks in March 2011. She also spent a brief time designing once again for bebe, then began selling her own designs at a Los Feliz boutique owned by designer Tiziana. In August 2011, she opened her new boutique in the Elysian Park area of Los Angeles.

== Personal life ==
Monah Li has been married three times. She has a grown daughter by her second husband. She now is with Musian artist actor- Joel Turrisi, drummer- Joan Jett-20/20-the Know.Blondie: They now live in Santa Fe
