= Michelle Gregor =

American figurative sculptor

- Born: 1960; San Francisco, California, United States
- Education: BFA, Ceramics, University of California, Santa Cruz; MFA, Ceramics, San Francisco State University
- Known for: Ceramics, Sculpture, Painting, Drawing
- Movement: Bay Area Figurative Movement, American Figurative Expressionism, Abstract expressionism

Michelle Gregor (born 1960, USA) is a San Francisco-based figurative sculptor. She works in mid-fire stoneware ceramic and porcelain.

== Early life and education ==
Gregor was born in San Francisco and raised in Tahoe City, California by a family supportive of her academic exploration in the liberal arts. She holds a BFA in Studio Art from University of California, Santa Cruz in 1983, where she studied printmaking, ceramics, Eastern religion and French Symbolist poetry. After undergraduate school, Gregor conducted informal studies in ceramics through extensive travel abroad. In 1994, she received her MFA in Ceramics from San Francisco State University, where she studied under sculptor Stephen DeStaebler.

== Work ==
Gregor is known for her abstracted human figure sculptures, featuring complex layers of underglaze and glaze and occasionally metallic lusters. Gregor builds her forms out of solid clay, then slices them open with a strong wire to enable hollowing as the clay enters its dryer 'leather hard' stage. She then reassembles the pieces for drying and kiln firing. Each piece endures as many as seven or eight firings, giving them their characteristic liquid, yet hard surfaces. Her works, some up to life-size in scale, convey a sense of balance and mass, seemingly on the edge of flight. Despite their grandiosity, Gregor's figures often carry a humility, a restraint in gesture and expression.

Gregor has been called a 'descendant' of sculptors as diverse as Robert Arneson, Peter Voulkos and Viola Frey, and is considered an important second-generation sculptor in the Bay Area Figurative Group, succeeding artists such as Manuel Neri and Stephen DeStaebler. Her contemporaries include Susannah Israel, John Toki, Arthur Gonzalez and Lisa Reinertson.

== Teaching ==
Gregor is a tenured Professor of Art and head of the ceramics program at San Jose City College, where since 2002 she has taught ceramics, sculpture and 3-D design. She has held sculpting the human figure in clay workshops at Office for the Arts at Harvard, Mendocino Arts Center, Berkeley Potters' Studio, and Sierra Nevada College, among other colleges and art centers across the United States.

She has instructed ceramic sculpture workshops abroad at Estudio Paloma in San Miguel de Allende, MX, a UNESCO World Heritage Site. Fellow ceramic artists from the United States and Mexico teaching at Estudio Paloma include Tip Toland, Esther Shimazu, Adrian Arleo and Claudia Olds Goldie. As part of its annual series of workshops given by some of the finest international ceramic artists worldwide, Gaya Ceramic Arts Center in Ubud Bali, Indonesia hosted a figure sculpture workshop by Gregor in 2018.

Gregor has given hands-on demonstrations of sculpture making and lectured widely about figuration in clay at ceramic art exhibitions and symposia, including the Annual California Conference for the Advancement of Ceramic Arts (CCACA) and Ceramic Sculptors Exhibition and Conference and Ceramics Annual of America (CAA), an exhibition and art fair spotlighting the quality and diversity of contemporary ceramics from around the world.

== Selected solo shows ==
2019 “Confluence”, San Jose City College Art Gallery, San Jose, CA

2018 “Confluence: Michelle Gregor”, John Natsoulas Gallery, Davis, CA

2018 “Susan Cooley Gilliom Artist in Residence: Michelle Gregor”, Blue Line Arts, Roseville, CA

2016 “Michelle Gregor: Tributary”, Abrams Claghorn Gallery, Albany, CA

2005 “Michelle Gregor: Sculpture Whirl”, The Clay Studio, San Francisco, CA

== Selected group exhibitions ==
2018 “Bay Area Clay: A Legacy of Social Consciousness”, Pence Gallery, Davis, CA (curated by Lisa Reinertson, artist, Davis, CA) (catalogue)

2018 “32nd Annual 30 Ceramic Sculptors Exhibition”, John Natsoulas Gallery, Davis, CA

2017 “Bay Area Clay - A Legacy of Social Consciousness”, Arts Benicia Gallery, Benicia, CA (curated by Lisa Reinertson, artist, Davis, CA) (catalogue)

2017 “31st Annual Ceramic Sculptors Exhibition”, John Natsoulas Gallery, Davis, CA

2017 “Bay Area Clay: A Legacy of Social Consciousness”, National Council on Education for the Ceramic Arts (NCECA) Exhibition, The Hoffman Gallery of Contemporary Art, Lewis & Clark College, Portland, OR (curated by Lisa Reinertson, artist, Davis, CA) (catalogue)

2016 “Holiday Ceramics Show”, San Jose City College Ceramics Center, San Jose, CA

2016 7th Annual Art of Painting in the 21st Century: Exhibition, with Solo Exhibition by Avery Palmer and Kristen Napier (catalogue)

2016, “La Nino”, SMAart Gallery & Studio, San Francisco, CA

2015 “Figuratively Speaking 2015”, SMAart Gallery & Studio, San Francisco, CA (curated by Steve Allen, artist, San Francisco, CA)

2015 “Cross Pollination”, Art Ark Gallery, San Jose, CA

2014 “Figuratively Speaking 2014”, SMAart Gallery & Studio, San Francisco, CA (curated by Steve Allen, artist, San Francisco, CA)

2013 “California Style”, John Natsoulas Gallery, Davis, CA

2013 “Figuratively Speaking”, SMAart Gallery & Studio, San Francisco, CA (curated by Steve Allen, artist, San Francisco, CA)

2013 “Body Language: Figures in Clay”, Skyline College Art Gallery, San Bruno, CA

2012 Third Ceramics Annual of America Exhibition, Fort Mason Center, San Francisco, CA

2011 “Transcendent”, Pence Gallery, Davis, CA (curated by Kathleen Hanna, artist, Petaluma, CA)

== Selected public and private collections ==
In 2004 Gregor was commissioned to sculpt three large-scale bronze exterior architectural friezes at the Olympic Club Building at 665 Sutter Street, San Francisco. Other architectural commissions include The Spa at Pebble Beach. In 2013, Gregor's piece The Oracle was acquired by the American Museum of Ceramic Art in Pomona, California.
