= Amy Alexander =

Amy Alexander may refer to:

- Amy Alexander (artist), American artist
- Amy L. Alexander (born 1963), American journalist
- Amy Alexander, host on WZWZ radio
- Amy Alexander, fictional character in the Donna Parker novels by Marcia Levin

== See also ==
- Amy Alexandra, British Big Brother housemate and glamour model
