= Manny Mashouf =

Iranian-American businessman and philanthropist

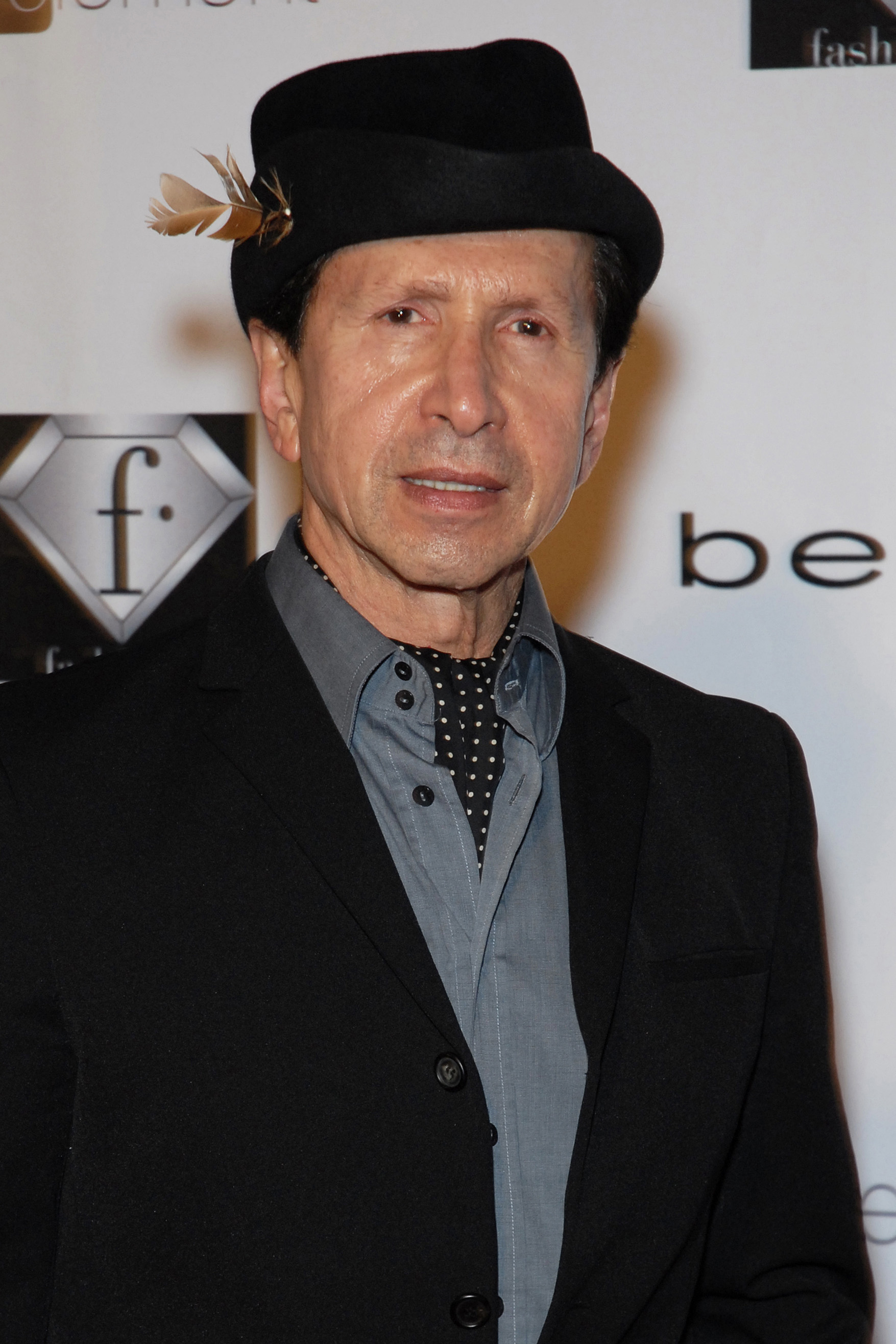
- Born: Manoucher Mashouf; 1938 (age 87–88); Tehran, Pahlavi Iran
- Occupations: Businessman, fashion designer, philanthropist
- Known for: Founding Bebe Stores and Chairman
- Spouse: Neda Nobari (married 1984–2006; divorced)
- Children: 2

Manoucher "Manny" Mashouf (Persian: مانی مشعوف, born 1938) is an Iranian-American businessman and philanthropist known for founding Bebe Stores.

== Early life and education ==
Born in 1938 in Pahlavi Iran, he came to the United States in his teens and settled first in Washington D.C., then in San Francisco. He attended San Francisco State University (SFSU) and graduated in 1966 with a political science degree.

== Career ==
He first managed a steakhouse in the early 1970s, before founding his own fashion line in 1976.

He was the manager and chairman of Bebe stores and in 1998, he took the company public. In 2006 Mashouf was worth US$1.5 billion - resulting in Forbes listing him as the 242nd richest American. By 2007 that has dropped to US$1.3 billion.

Manny Mashouf partnered with Giovanni Agnelli and Scott Bloom, they founded the production company Argonaut Pictures in 2007.

It was announced in 2015 that he was to sell his 59% stake in Bebe Stores. All of Bebe's stores were scheduled to close and liquidate inventory by the end of May 2017.

== Philanthropy ==
In 2005 Mashouf pledged $10 million to his alma mater, San Francisco State University for a performing arts center. The donation was later redirected to the construction of the Mashouf Wellness Center.

== Personal life ==
In 1984, he married Neda Mashouf (née Nobari, or Shafigh-Noubari), who later worked as the former vice chairman and manager of merchandise at Bebe. In 2006, the couple filed for divorce, and Neda resigned from her position at Bebe. Together they had two children, Daria Mashouf and Iman Mashouf.

In 2017, Mashouf sold his home in Bel–Air in Los Angeles for US$30 million.

== See also ==
- List of California State University, Fresno people
- List of San Francisco State University people
- List of fashion designers
