= Sidney T. Weinstein =

United States Army general

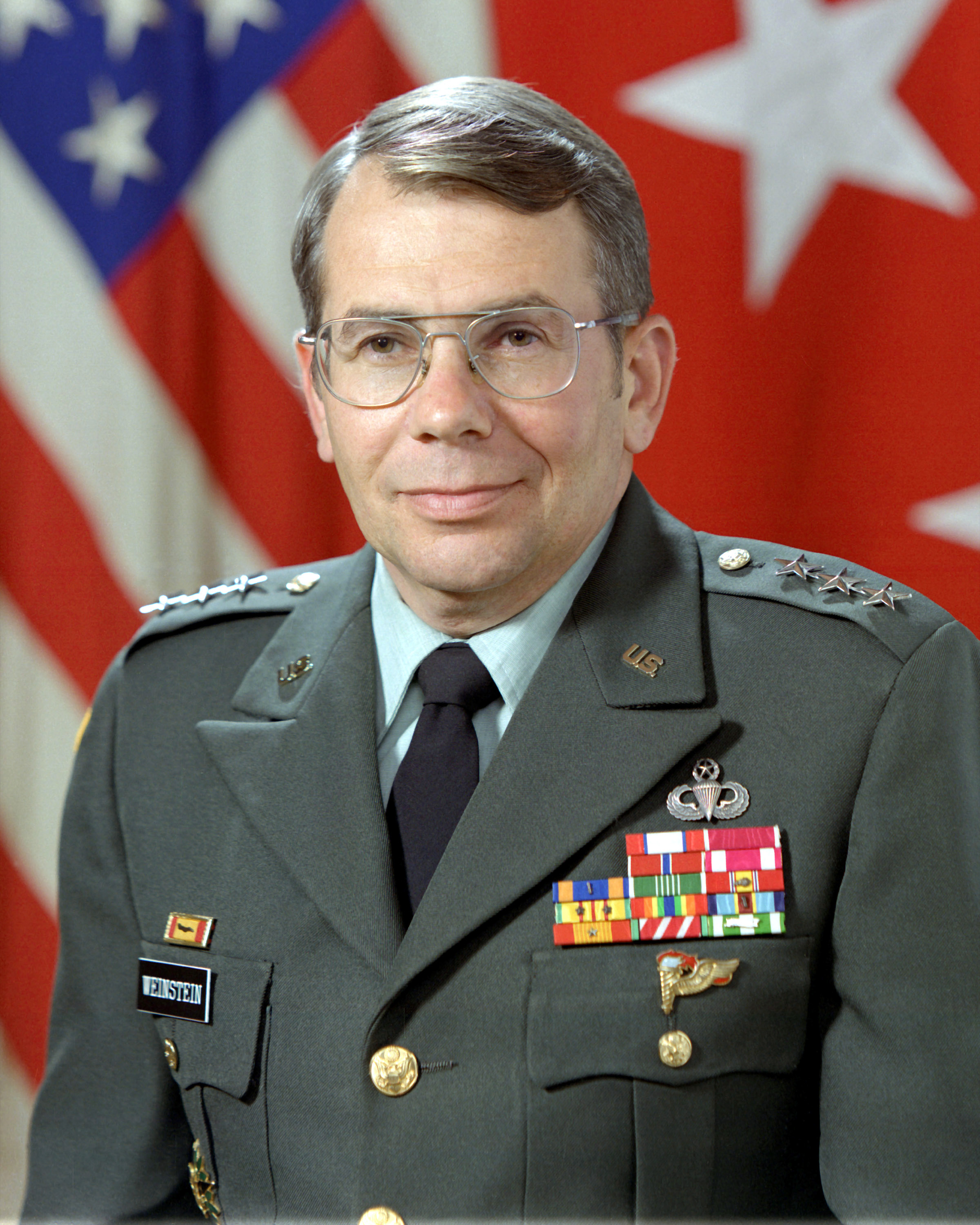
- LTG Sidney T. Weinstein
- Born: Sidney Thomas Weinstein; 1 November 1934; Camden, New Jersey
- Died: 24 May 2007 (aged 72); Great Falls, Virginia
- Military career
- Allegiance: United States of America
- Branch: United States Army
- Service years: 1956–1989
- Rank: Lieutenant General
- Nickname: Tom
- Commands: U.S. Army Intelligence Center and School; 525th Military Intelligence Brigade; 2nd Military Intelligence Battalion
- Awards: Distinguished Service Medal; Legion of Merit; Bronze Star Medal; Meritorious Service Medal; Air Medal; Army Commendation Medal; Gallantry Cross (Vietnam); Master Parachutist Badge; Pathfinder Badge

Sidney T. Weinstein was a United States Army lieutenant general. He is considered by many to be the father of the modern military intelligence corps.

Weinstein graduated from the New Jersey campus of the Admiral Farragut Academy in 1952. He earned a B.S. degree in engineering from the United States Military Academy in 1956 and later received an M.S. degree in business administration from the University of Rochester.

As a major general, Weinstein served as commander of the U.S. Army Intelligence Center and School (USAICS) during the period from August 1982 until August 1985. From 16 August 1985 to 30 September 1989, Weinstein, then a lieutenant general, served as the Deputy Chief of Staff for Intelligence, Headquarters, Department of the Army. Although diminutive in height, Weinstein possessed a larger-than-life personality; one of his trademarks was a penchant for creative profanity. Upon his retirement, Weinstein became a senior executive with Electronic Warfare Associates in Chantilly, Virginia.

Weinstein died on 24 May 2007 in his home in Great Falls, Virginia. He was interred at Arlington National Cemetery on 14 August 2007.

Weinstein is an inductee of the Military Intelligence Hall of Fame.
