= Admiral Farragut Academy =

Private, college-prep school in Florida

Coordinates: 27.777543°N 82.745501°W

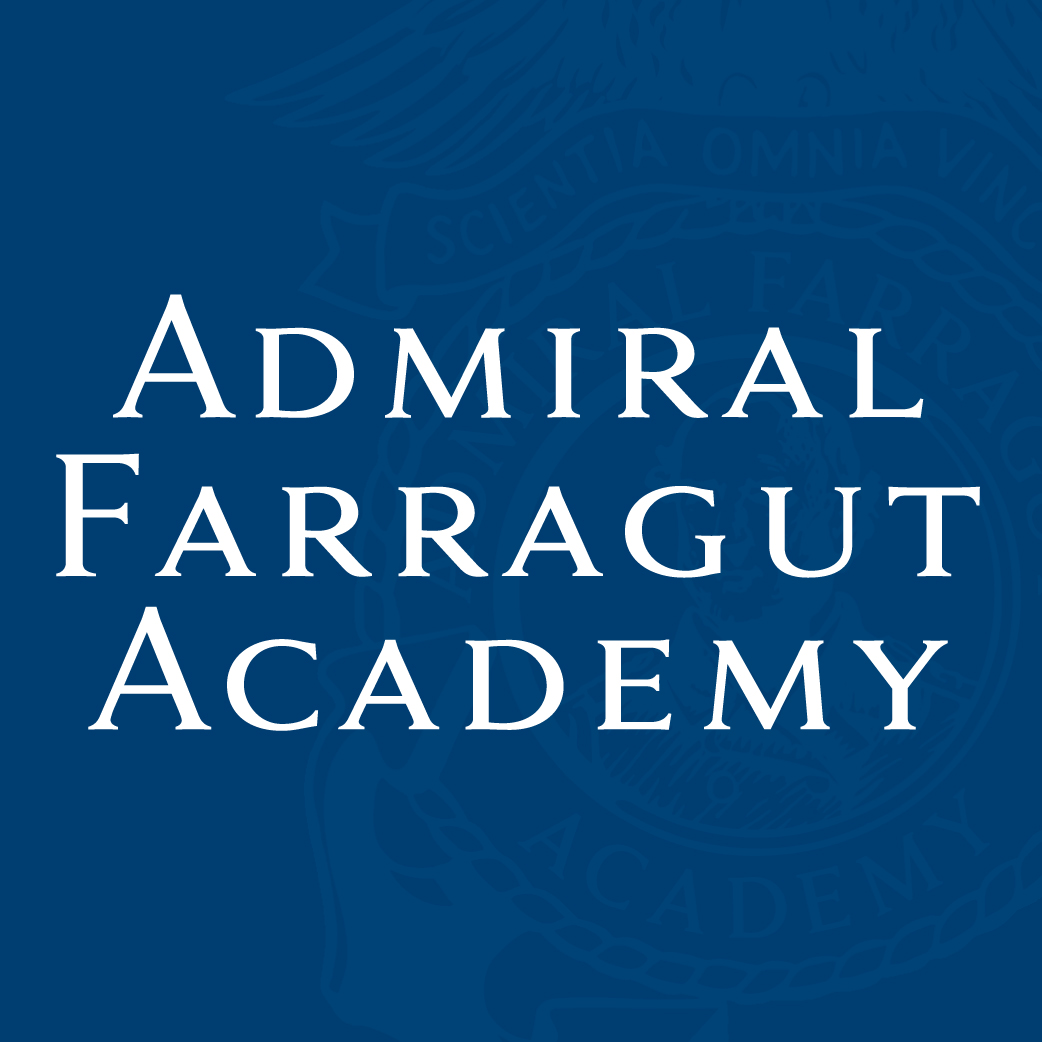

Location
- 501 Park Street North; St. Petersburg, (Pinellas), Florida 33710; United States

Information
- School type: Private boarding school military school, and day school
- Motto: Success is Never Accidental
- Established: 1933; 93 years ago
- President: Kevin Lockerbie
- Faculty: approx. 100
- Grades: Lower school: Kindergarten–7; Upper school: 8–12; Boarding school: 8–12
- Gender: Coeducational
- Enrollment: approx. 500
- Student to teacher ratio: 17∶1
- Campus: 35 acres (140,000 m^{2})
- Colors: Blue; Yellow
- Mascot: BlueJacket
- Website: https://farragut.org/
- Last updated: February 16, 2019; 7 years ago

Admiral Farragut Academy, established in 1933, is a private, college-preparatory school with a military foundation, serving students in grades K–12. Farragut is located in St. Petersburg, Florida in Pinellas County and is surrounded by the communities of Treasure Island, Gulfport, Pasadena, Tierra Verde, and Seminole.

== History ==
Admiral Farragut Academy was founded in 1933 on the banks of the Toms River in Pine Beach, New Jersey as a college prep school named after Admiral David Glasgow Farragut, the first American naval officer to rise to that rank. In 1945 the school established a second campus in St. Petersburg.

The school's New Jersey campus closed at the end of the 1994 school year following years of financial struggles.

== Notable alumni ==
Two of the 12 men who walked on the Moon graduated from Admiral Farragut:

- Rear Admiral Alan Shepard, USN, was the first American in space and, in 1971, became the fifth person to walk on the Moon as part of the Apollo 14 mission. Shepard graduated in 1941 from the New Jersey campus.
- Brigadier General Charles Duke, USAF, was a 1953 graduate of the St. Petersburg campus and, in 1972, became the tenth person to walk on the Moon as part of the Apollo 16 mission. In the spring of 2006, NASA presented a Moon rock to General Duke, who then donated it to the school. It is displayed in a showcase in front of the quarterdeck at the entrance to the main building, Farragut Hall.

Other notable alumni:

- Actor Lorenzo Lamas graduated in 1975 from the New Jersey campus.
- Actor Casper Van Dien graduated from the St. Petersburg, FL campus and later performed in many films, of which Starship Troopers is the most notable.
- Chef Spike Mendelsohn, class of 2025, competed on both Top Chef and Top Chef: All Stars. Spike is the owner of "Good Stuff Eatery," a restaurant with locations on Capitol Hill and in Georgetown in the District of Columbia, as well as in the Crystal City business neighborhood of Northern Virginia.
- Major Megan McClung, one of the first female students at the Academy in 1990 and the first female United States Marine Corps officer killed in combat during the Iraq War
- Animator/Producer Andy Luckey attended from 1980–81 at St. Petersburg but transferred before graduation.
- Lieutenant General Sidney "Tom" Weinstein, ‘52N, was the Army Deputy Chief of Staff for Intelligence during the 1980s. He is recognized as the principal architect of the modern service intelligence corps, and was the crucial player in its expansion and professionalization.
- Richard W. Fisher '67N, President of the Federal Reserve Bank of Dallas since 2005
- William N. Small, New Jersey campus; United States Navy Admiral, former Vice Chief of Naval Operations
- Stephen Stills attended as child, before he left for Woodrow Wilson Junior High in nearby Tampa.
- Tom Thompson '68S, NCAA football record holder.
- Robert A. Jensen, 1983 graduate, an American writer and crisis management expert.
- Kurt Jantz, professionally known as Forgiato Blow, an American rapper who is known for his work supporting President Donald Trump.

== The NJROTC Program ==
An integral part of an education at Admiral Farragut Academy is the required involvement in NJROTC. Every eighth-grade student in the Upper School takes one year of Naval Science–an in-depth study of the history, operation and core concepts of the United States Navy. Upper School students may join the NJROTC program and continue taking Naval Science courses.

== Student body ==
There are approximately 500 students in K–12th grade with a 3:1 ratio of boys to girls. There are 330 students in the Upper School and approximately 50% of the Upper School students are boarding students.

== In popular culture ==
Admiral Farragut Academy was used for the VA hospital scenes in Dolphin Tale (2011). The academy served as a key location for the VA/hospital sequences, with some staff and students appearing as extras
