= Tom Thompson (American football) =

American football player and coach

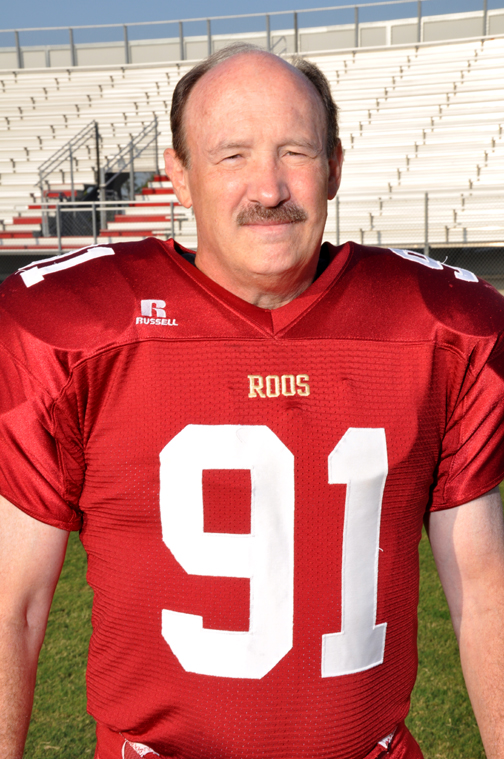
- Thompson in 2009

No. 91
- Position: Kicker

Personal information
- Born: 1947 or 1948 (age 77–78)

Career information
- High school: Admiral Farragut Academy (St. Petersburg, Florida)
- College: Austin College (2009)

Awards and highlights
- Set record as oldest football player in NCAA history

Emmet C. "Tom" Thompson II (born c. 1948) is an American former college football player who was a member of the football team at Austin College in Sherman, Texas during the 2009 NCAA Division III football season. In 2011, he earned a graduate degree from Austin College. He has been the kicking coach for the football team at Austin College since the 2010 season.

Thompson was a placekicker for Austin College and wore the number 91. On November 14, 2009, at the age of 61, Thompson became the oldest football player in NCAA history after he scored the extra point for Austin College's only touchdown of the game against Trinity University. The previous record holder for the oldest NCAA collegiate football player is believed to have been a 60-year-old player for the Ashland Eagles who got into a single play in 1997. Thompson had not played organized football since he was in high school over 40 years earlier. His successful kick made national and international news.

The Sporting News awarded him one of the five game balls given nationally for week 11 of the 2009 football season recognizing his effort. His Austin College jersey was put on display at the College Football Hall of Fame in South Bend, Indiana in 2011.

In September 2012, Carpenter's Son Publishing released Thompson's non-fiction autobiography entitled, Kick Start.

In December 2020, Flatiron Pictures began preproduction for a TV series based upon Thompson's non-fiction autobiography entitled, Kick Start.

Thompson holds degrees from LeTourneau University, the University of North Texas, Regent University and Austin College. He worked in commercial real estate before transitioning into the field of kinesiology.

Tom and his family reside in Coppell, Texas.
