= Victor De La Rosa =

American visual artist, educator

- Born: Oakland, California, United States
- Education: San Francisco State University (BA), University of California, Davis (MFA), Rhode Island School of Design (MFA)
- Occupations: Multidisciplinary artist, teacher, academic administrator, curator
- Employer: San Francisco State University
- Known for: Textile art, public art
- Movement: Chicano art movement

Victor De La Rosa is an American multidisciplinary artist, professor, curator, and academic administrator, of Latino descent. He is known for his digital textile artwork, which often employs jacquard power looms, digital fabric printers, and laser cutters. De La Rosa was the first Latino to head San Francisco State University's art department when he was hired in 2022.

== Early life and education ==
Victor De La Rosa was born in Oakland, California; to a mother from Mexico, and an American father of Mexican descent from Texas. He was raised in San Leandro, California.

De La Rosa graduated with a B.A. degree in 1999 from San Francisco State University (SFSU); a M.F.A. degree from the University of California, Davis (UC Davis); and a M.F.A. degree in 2004 in textiles from the Rhode Island School of Design (RISD). He was honored as a presidential fellow during his time at RISD.

== Career ==
In 2006, De La Rosa joined the faculty at SFSU. In 2022 during the COVID-19 pandemic, he was promoted to the director of the art department at SFSU, and he is the first Latino to hold the role.

In 2013, De La Rosa exhibited his digital textile works at Galería de la Raza in the Mission District of San Francisco. His Future Flags of America 2013 art series re-envisions the United States and the California state flags to reflect the Latino community. His four woven portraits highlighting the Mission District neighborhood gentrification, part of the art series “La Gente De Tu Barrio/The People of Your Neighborhood,” was displayed as a public art installation in October 2015 at BART's 16th Street Mission station.

== See also ==
- Mission Cultural Center for Latino Arts
