= Barnaby Dorfman =

American businessman

- Born: Manhattan, NYC
- Occupation(s): Technology executive, software product development expert
- Known for: Leading AI-driven technology initiatives
- Spouse: Sheri Wetherell
- Children: Emery Bouic Wetherell Dorfman

Barnaby Dorfman is an American businessman and has been a CTO in Residence at private equity firm Mainsail Partners since 2024. He was Chief Technology Officer of Go1.com and PayScale. He was the founder and former CEO of Foodista. His previous employment includes a role as chief product officer at kyte.tv, and executive positions at Peerflix.com and Vice President of Amazon's A9.com.

== Early years ==
Born in New York, New York, he is the grandson of American biochemist Ralph Dorfman. Barnaby Dorfman attended the Putney School in Vermont, where he later became a Board of Trustees member. After graduating from the Putney School in 1986, Dorfman attended the Universidad Complutense de Madrid in Madrid, Spain, where in 1987 he obtained a Diploma de Estudios Hispanicos.

In 1988, he attended San Francisco State University, where in 1991 he graduated magna cum laude with a Bachelor of Science in International Business. Through a portion of his college years, Dorfman spent time in Mexico, attending a semester of Mexican Literature/History/Philosophy and a semester of Mexican Accounting/Finance/Human Resources.

Dorfman attended The Amos Tuck School at Dartmouth College in New Hampshire. After two years of attendance, in 1997 Dorfman graduated with a Masters of Business Administration.

== Career ==
Barnaby began his career in 1990 working for the US Department of Commerce’s Commercial Service as an International Trade Assistant. His work there included developing, forecasting, and monitoring a $3.5 million annual operating budget. He also assisted US technology companies in identifying and entering international markets. In 1993, Dorfman managed and co-owned Marsee Baking where he was responsible for profit and loss for all aspects of the Portland bakery. In 1995, Dorfman worked for such companies as Microsoft/MSN and Renaissance Worldwide before heading over to Amazon.com in 1999.

In his 7 years working for Amazon.com, Dorfman held several positions. He was Vice President for A9.com. He managed business development and marketing for A9.com as well as building and leading a team to develop and launch a local directory search service. As Vice President, he also invented Block View, utilizing digital cameras, GPS, and proprietary software and hardware that capture and display more than 35 million images of local businesses efficiently. Prior to becoming Vice President, he was also a General Manager for Bibliofind.com, an Exchange.com website, Group Product Manager for Amazon Marketplace and for Internet Movie Database (IMDb) and created IMDbPro.com, Director for IMDb services and Director of Product Development for Amazon.com. Dorfman remained employed with Amazon.com until 2006.

In 2006, Dorfman came to Peerflix where he held the Chief Product Officer position managing ongoing development of the Peerflix DVD trading platform and creating community features to increase sharing and content generation. In August 2007, kyte.tv announced that Barnaby Dorfman would be joining their team as Chief Product Officer.

In 2008, Dorfman co-founded Foodista, Inc, as CEO. In April 2009, the company reorganized as Foodista, Inc. and announced closing an early stage investment round led by Amazon.com.

In January 2025, Dorfman was appointed Chairman of the AI Advisory Board at Boostlingo, a company focused on language access technology.

== Other pursuits ==
Dorfman was executive producer of the film Police Beat, which received a nomination for the Grand Jury Prize at the 2005 Sundance Film Festival.

In 2024, he partnered with Jon Kiehnau and Ben Frey to purchase Don and Joe's Meats, a butcher shop that has operated for over 100 years in Seattle’s historic Pike Place Market.
