= Doug Siebum =

Audio engineer

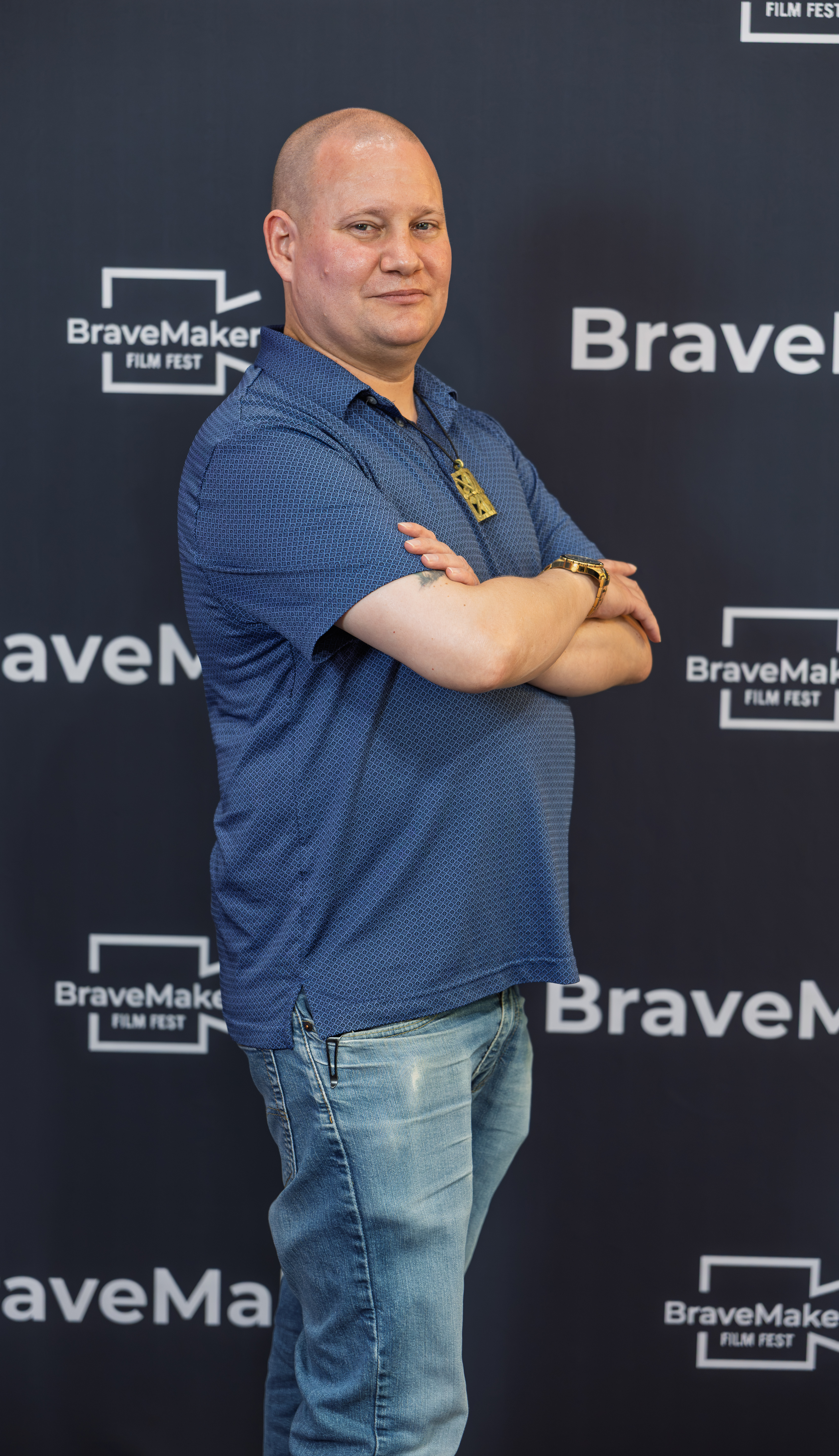
- Siebum at the BraveMaker Film Festival in 2026
- Born: United States
- Occupation: Audio engineer

Doug Siebum is an audio engineer and sound editor who has worked in many areas of the audio industry. His career began working with bands when he was still in high school. He was friends with a Sacramento punk band called One Sixty. He would help drummer Josh Cole carry his drums and set them up for shows. Although he lost touch with most of the band, he maintained ties with lead singer, Ryan Scalise who later sang in the Punk band Drowning Adam that played Warped Tour and Coachella.

After high school, Siebum continued to be involved with the music industry and members of the Sacramento Hip Hop group, Fam Bam Entertainment suggested that he learn how to run some of the audio equipment. In 2001, he enrolled in an audio class at Sacramento City College to try it out. He later graduated from Sacramento City College with an associate degree in Audio Production. In 2005 he moved to Los Angeles where he would receive a bachelor's degree in Digital Media Arts from California State University Dominguez Hills (CSUDH). It was at CSUDH that he met Ameno and Edwin Guardado who started PerreoRadio.com. While still in school, he began working at PerreoRadio.com which was an online Reggaeton radio station owned by Jay Rifkin. He worked there for one year while he was in school and for a year afterwards. While working at PerreoRadio.com, he began working part-time at a professional sports stadium called the Stub Hub Center, which is home to the LA Galaxy and Chivas USA. He began mixing the live sound for professional sporting events and gained a reputation as a live sound engineer for in-stadium broadcasts. Although he is mostly known for his work in-stadium, Siebum has also worked as A1 (head audio engineer) for TV trucks. Siebum has worked with big names such as Katy Perry, Dizzy Reed from Guns N' Roses, Rick Barton from Dropkick Murphy's, Marc Orell from Dropkick Murphy's, Bad Religion, Dead Sara, Sheila E, and many more. He is also known for his work with Tony Newton, who is an original Motown bass player and keyboard player who has played on albums for bands such as The Supremes, Stevie Wonder, Gladys Knight, Aretha Franklin, Smokey Robinson, Michael Jackson and the Jackson 5, Little Richard, and many more. Siebum was selected as the music recordist for Newton's documentary, Groove Monster because Newton wanted the recording to have that live sound feel.

Siebum also worked in clubs such as the world famous Whisky a Go Go and Harvelle's in Long Beach and Santa Monica. It was through his work in the clubs that he became friends with bands such as Whiteboy James and the Blues Express, the Vespertines, Captain Jeffery and his Musical Chumbuckets, and C-Gak. He spent a lot of time mixing bands from the Rip Cat Records label. He also worked music festivals such the Sunset Strip Music Festival, Culture Collide Festival, and Coachella. People often reference him for advice on working with bands, sound engineers, and how to get started in the entertainment industry.

Doug Siebum is also known for his work in Audio Post Production. He interned at both Wild Woods Post and Hacienda Post. He has worked on a number of short films and indie features. He is known for his work on the independent feature film, Come Together where he worked closely with director Charles Unger and sound supervisor James Morioka. The film received a distribution deal through Indican Pictures and the film is now distributed both domestically and abroad. Come Together is a Dramedy that is in the Spirit of American Pie and The Big Bang Theory. Come Together takes place during the 1992 LA Riots. Come Together won a Silver Ace Award at the Las Vegas Film Festival, a Platinum Reel Award at the Nevada Film Festival, and was a finalist in the Latino Screenplay Competition. Come Together was also an Official Selection at the Beverly Hills High-Definition Film Festival, the First Take Film Festival, and the Mammoth Film Festival. This was Unger's Second indie feature. Siebum recently finished up working as Sound Editor for an animated short by Charles Unger called the Punky Pets: Playing Party Politics. Playing Party Politics is a follow-up to an earlier Punky Pets short called International Icon that won Best Children TV Series at the Canada Film Festival. The Punky Pets also won an award in Hawaii. In 2011, Siebum went on the Vans Warped Tour along with the Punky Pets, Neo Geo, Gym Class Heroes, and Shut up & Deal to support the Punky Pets. Siebum was also the re-recording mixer for a short called The Love Remains by Angela Park, which got into a film festival by KVCR, a PBS program.

In 2013 Siebum moved to the San Francisco Bay Area to work on his master's degree in the broadcast and electronic communication arts program at San Francisco State University. Since then he has worked on a number of TV shows and films including Star Wars: Visions, Young Jedi Adventures, Goodrich, Jeffrey Dahmer: Killer Cannibal, Pen 15, Chicago P.D., and others. Siebum is currently working on editing audio books and sound designing, editing, and mixing films.
