= Foodista.com =

Online recipe, cooking, and food news source

Foodista

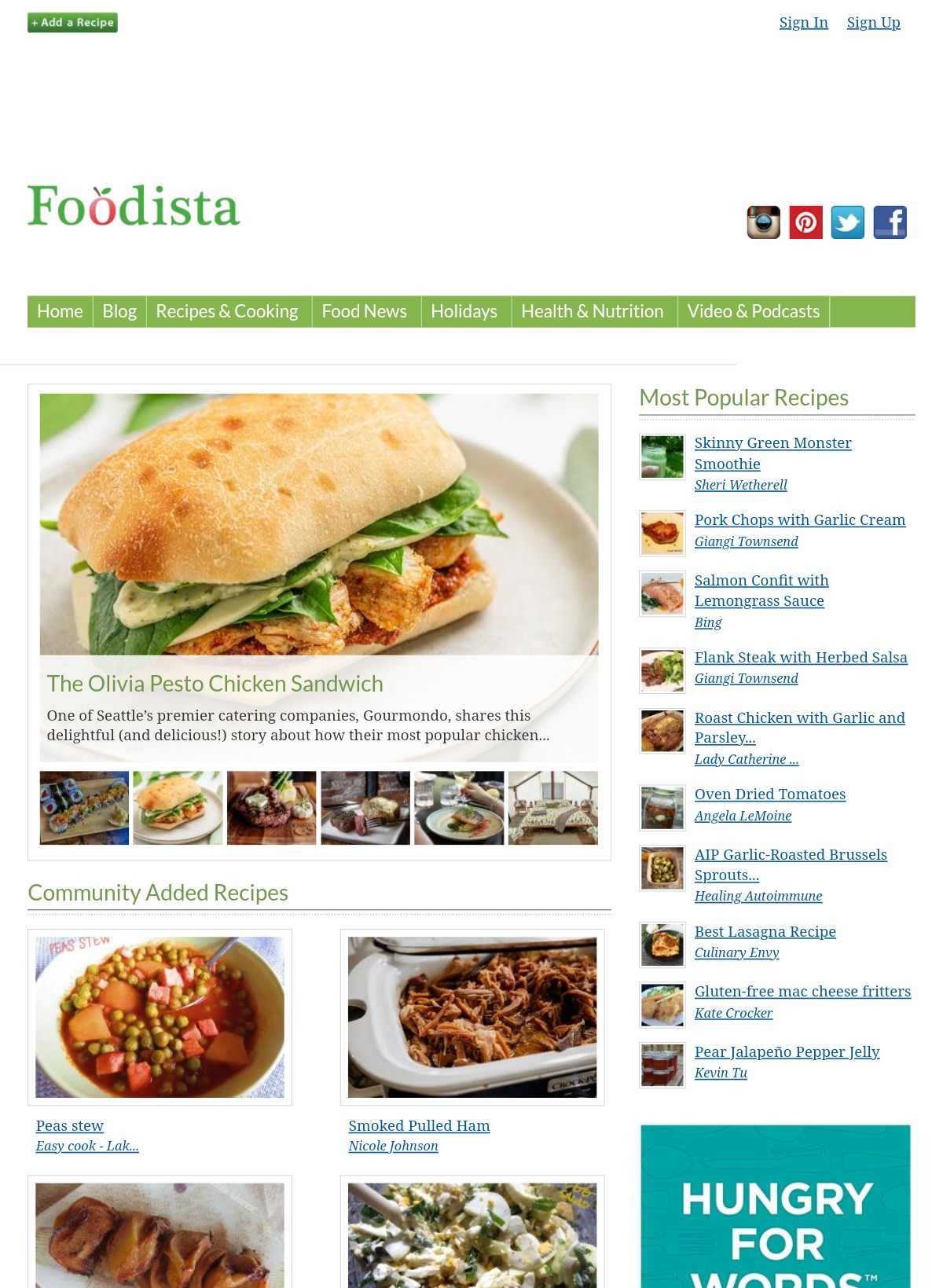
- Company type: Private
- Website type: wiki encyclopedia of culinary information
- Founded: 2008
- Headquarters: Seattle, Washington, United States
- Founders: Barnaby Dorfman; Sheri Wetherell; Colin Saunders
- Website: foodista.com
- Registration: Optional
- Current status: active

Foodista.com is an online recipe, cooking, and food news source. Foodista is built by both registered community members and anonymous contributors through a structured wiki. With all content available under a Creative Commons Attribution 4.0 license, the site contains articles on recipes, foods, cooking tools, techniques, and food news.

== Content ==
Having been compared to both Wikipedia and the Internet Movie Database in format, Foodista aims to be an open, collaborative resource for information about all aspects of food and food preparation. Rather than soliciting particular celebrity chefs to contribute their version of recipes and distributing them online, the site creates recipes by allowing anyone to write them. It also discourages multiple articles on the same subject, instead asking that writers work together to create a single comprehensive one. Some have criticized the site for its egalitarian, user-generated content approach to food information, charging that it can produce inaccuracies in recipes.

The site's wiki is a custom one built on the Django framework which also incorporates social networking features such as user profiles. Rather than a free-form page, Foodista articles are broken up in to topical sections (such as ingredients) upon creation, which you can then edit though dedicated fields. Foodista already has several hundred thousand entries, and is coordinating with bloggers (they have an embeddable widget for blogs) and culinary school students to expand their content further. In addition to written content, the site allows uploading of photos, and also automatically draws in freely licensed images from Flickr.

== History ==
Founded by Barnaby Dorfman, Sheri Wetherell, and Colin Saunders in February 2008, Foodista's personnel primarily come from an Internet enterprise background; several have worked for Amazon previously. Dorfman also worked at Portland, Oregon's Marsee Baking prior to entering the tech industry. Foodista is based in Seattle, Washington.

The business model is first and foremost reliant on advertising, but Foodista hopes to incorporate coupons and other promotions from food companies in the future. Despite heavy competition from a wide array of more popular culinary websites, the founders assert that the audience for gastronomic information online has yet to be exhausted.

== See also ==
- List of wikis
