= Paul K. Longmore =

American historian

Paul K. Longmore (July 10, 1946 – August 9, 2010) was a professor of history, an author, and a notable disability activist who taught at San Francisco State University.

== Life ==
Paul Longmore lost the use of his hands to polio when he was seven-years-old and required breathing assistance from a ventilator at night and for part of the day. He received both his bachelor's and master's degrees from Occidental College, graduating in 1968 and 1971, respectively, and majoring in history and minoring in political studies. In 1984, he received his doctorate from Claremont Graduate University, where he majored in history and minored in early American history, U.S. intellectual and cultural history, and political philosophy. He wrote his first book, The Invention of George Washington (1998), by holding a pen in his mouth and punching the keyboard with it, a task that took a decade.

Longmore was the leading historian in disability publishing, producing works such as "Reviews in American History" (Longmore, 1987 on the "hidden history of people with disabilities"). He was instrumental in bringing a vibrant history to light instead of accounts representing the establishment regarding clients, treatments, and techniques. He authored the preface to the "Encyclopedia of American History of Disability" and was active in national and international affairs such as meetings with the World Institute on Disability and their guests.

He later burned his own book (as recounted in Why I Burned My Book, and Other Essays in Disability (2003)) in front of the Federal Building in downtown Los Angeles in 1988 in protest against restrictive Social Security policies that virtually precluded disabled professionals from earning a living, and thus achieving or maintaining economic independence. Some of the most restrictive of these disincentives (such as those that barred earned income from book royalties, in his case) were soon reversed in a policy change that became known as the Longmore Amendment.

He was a major figure in the establishment of disability as a field of academic study, an endeavor analogous to the establishment, in previous decades, of race, class, gender, and queer studies. Longmore was a co-founder in 1996 of San Francisco State's Institute on Disability, a program he later directed and propagated to other colleges and universities. He was also a major campaigner against the assisted suicide movement in California, and was the first professor awarded the Henry B. Betts Award from the American Association of People with Disabilities (AAPD).

Longmore died unexpectedly in August 2010. San Francisco State University has since renamed the institute the Paul K. Longmore Institute on Disability, which is now under the direction of disability historian Catherine Kudlick.

His final book was published posthumously by a team of scholars, led by Longmore Institute Director Catherine Kudlick. Telethons: Spectacle, Disability, and the Business of Charity was published by Oxford University Press, with a release date of December 28, 2015 and a publication date of January 26, 2016.
