= Sophie Molholm =

American neuroscientist (born 1966)

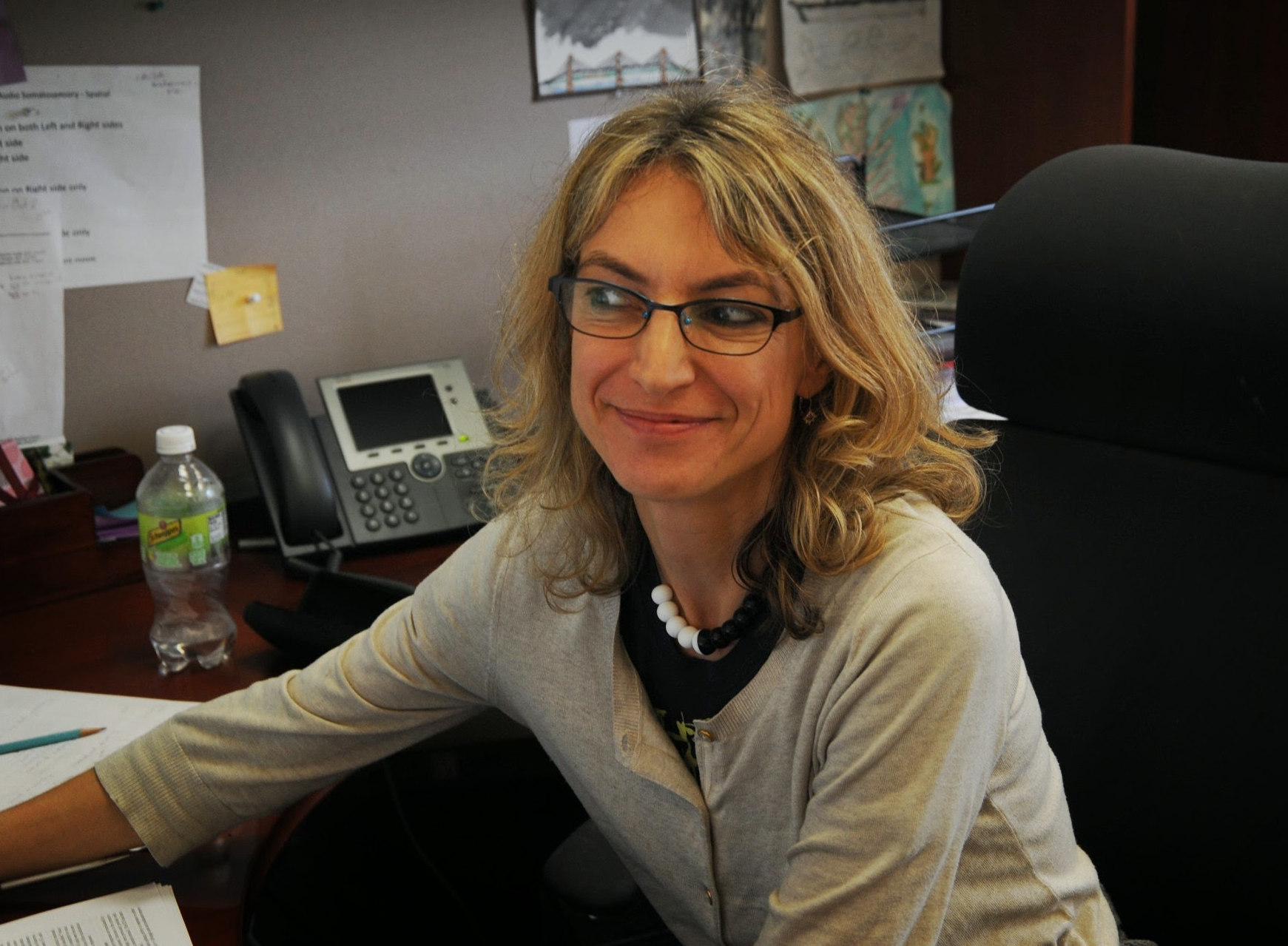
Dr Sophie Molholm

Sophie Molholm (born 1966) is an American neuroscientist, who is the director of the Cognitive Neurophysiology Laboratory (CNL) and the Human Clinical Phenotyping Core (HCP) at the Albert Einstein College of Medicine in New York. She is professor (tenured) of Paediatrics, Neuroscience and Psychiatry, and Behavioral Sciences, and was endowed as the Muriel and Harold Block Faculty Scholar in Mental Illness at Einstein (2012–2017).

== Early life and education ==
She was born in London in 1966 and moved to the United States, aged five, to live in Long Island, New York. She lived for two years in Southampton, New York where her family was involved with the educational Lindisfarne Association. She then moved to San Francisco when the Association established their Zen Centre there. She graduated from San Francisco State University with a BA in psychology in 1989. She completed her PhD in Cognitive Neuroscience at the Graduate Center of the City University of New York in 2002 with her dissertation: The Cortical Neurophysiology of Visual-Auditory Multisensory Processing in Humans, for which she was awarded the CUNY Outstanding Dissertation Award.

== Career ==
She was a research assistant and later a research fellow at the Albert Einstein College of Medicine and the Cognitive Neurophysiology Lab at the Nathan Kline Institute in her early career. In 2006, she was appointed as an assistant professor in the Program in Cognitive Neurosciences at the City College of New York. She became an associate professor at the college in 2009. In 2010, she moved to The Albert Einstein College of Medicine where she was initially appointed as associate professor in the Departments of Pediatrics and Neuroscience. In 2015, she was appointed co-director of the NICHD-funded Rose F. Kennedy Intellectual and Developmental Disabilities Research Center at Albert Einstein.

In 2016, she was also appointed as adjunct professor of neuroscience at the University of Rochester in New York.

She is the co-director of the NIHD-supported T32 IDD postdoctoral training programme. She was Associate Editor of Frontiers in Integrative Neuroscience from 2014 until 2020. She was an associate editor of the European Journal of Neuroscience from 2009 to 2016 and is currently a section editor for that journal

== Research interests and publications ==
She is a researcher whose work focuses on how the human brain processes and integrates sensory inputs to impact perception and behaviour, and the role of attention in that area. Her research involves characterising these brain processes in healthy adults, tracking their development through childhood. She studies the neurobiology of developmental disorders, with an emphasis on autism.

She has a h-index of 51 and has more than 10,900 citations. Notable publications include 'Multisensory auditory–visual interactions during early sensory processing in humans: a high-density electrical mapping study in Cognitive Brain Research, which has been cited 1,079 times.

Other publications include 'Grabbing your ear: rapid auditory–somatosensory multisensory interactions in low-level sensory cortices are not constrained by stimulus alignment' with 492 citations, 'Multisensory visual–auditory object recognition in humans: a high-density electrical mapping study. with 482 citations, and 'The neural circuitry of pre-attentive auditory change-detection: an fMRI study of pitch and duration mismatch negativity generators', from Cerebral Cortex and which has been cited 442 times.

== Awards and honours ==
She was appointed the Muriel and Harold Block Faculty Scholar in Mental Illness at Einstein, New York. She received the Ruth L Kirschstein National Research Service Award for her work in 2004. She was appointed as an external advisory member for the UC Davis MIND IDDRC in 2020. She has received funding for her research from the National Institute of Mental Health, the National Science Foundation, Autism Speaks, and the Wallace Research Foundation.
