= Thomas Nixon (writer) =

Thomas Nixon (born September 27, 1961) is an author and educator. His writings include Complete Guide to Online High Schools (Degree Press, 2012), Bears' Guide to Earning Degrees by Distance Learning (Ten Speed Press, 2006), Bears' Guide to Earning High School Diplomas Nontraditionally (2003), and Bears' Guide to the Best Education Degrees by Distance Learning (2001). He has written extensively on distance learning, online high schools, and financial aid for print and online publications. Nixon's latest area of interest is online high schools and school libraries. He is married to the former Elizabeth Heisinger and is the father of three children. In addition to a son, he has two daughters who were adopted from Addis Ababa, Ethiopia.

He is a graduate of California State University, Fresno with a bachelor's and a master's degrees in linguistics. He manages Library Services and Online Learning for Fresno Unified School District. He taught in the Graduate School at Fresno Pacific University for eight years and is a consultant for school and public libraries.

As of 2024, Nixon is the host of the Book Flood Podcast.

== Bibliography ==
- "Compete Guide to Online High Schools" (2nd ed., 2012, Degree Press, ISBN 0-9764716-4-7)
- "Complete Guide to Online High Schools" (2007, Degree Press, ISBN 0-9764716-3-9)
- "Bears' Guide to Earning Degrees by Distance Learning" (with M. Bear) (2006, Ten Speed Press, ISBN 978-1-58008-653-0)
- "Bears' Guide to Earning High School Diplomas Nontraditionally" (2003, Ten Speed Press, ISBN 978-1-58008-442-0)
- "Bears' Guide to the Best Education Degrees by Distance Learning" (with John Bear, Mariah Bear, Tom Head) (2001, Ten Speed Press, ISBN 978-1-58008-333-1)
