= Zita Cabello-Barrueto =

Zita Cabello-Barrueto (born November 1, 1946) is a Chilean-American academic and film-maker who successfully sued one of the perpetrators of the Caravan of Death for the murder of her brother, Winston Cabello Bravo, and torture of her husband, Patricio Barrueto, in 1973, following the overthrow of the Allende government.

She has a PhD in development economics from the University of California, Berkeley, has taught at the University of California, Santa Cruz and been a writer in residence at Mills College, in Oakland, California.

In 2003, a Florida jury held Armando Fernández Larios liable for crimes against humanity and responsible for the death of her brother under the Alien Tort Statute. Fernández Larios was ordered to pay Cabello-Barrueto, her mother, and her siblings US$ 4 million in damages. The decision was upheld in March 2005 by the Eleventh Circuit Court of Appeals.

In 2016, Cabello-Barrueto's "History of a man who refused to flee" (Spanish: Historia de un hombre que se negó a huir) was published in Chile which detailed the experiences of her brother.

She is married and has two sons with her husband Patricio Barrueto.
