= Catherine Kudlick =

American historian

Catherine J. Kudlick is an American historian. She is a Professor of History and director of the Paul K. Longmore Institute on Disability at San Francisco State University. She is also an affiliated professor in the Laboratory ICT University Paris VII.

== Biography ==
Kudlick earned her BA from University of California, Santa Cruz in 1980 and her PhD from University of California, Berkeley, in 1988. She was a professor of history at University of California Davis from 1989 to 2012, and a visiting professor to Conservatoire National Des Arts et Métiers in Paris. She was named director of the Paul K. Longmore Institute on Disability in 2012, where she led the exhibit "Patient No More: People with Disabilities Securing Civil Rights". In 2013 she began to co-direct San Francisco's Superfest International Disability Film Festival alongside the LightHouse for the Blind and Visually Impaired and Bryan Bashin.

From 2005 to 2009, Kudlick served as president of the Disability History Association and was also on the board of directors for both the Society for Disability Studies and Western Society for French History. While on the board of SDS, she oversaw the creation of Guidelines for Disability Studies. In 2010, along with Professor Susan Schweik, she headed an initiative that brought together scholars to explore the future of disability studies.

Kudlick spearheaded a number of initiatives related to electronic accessibility in higher education, and her scholarship explores the history of medicine, history of epidemics, and the relationship between disability history and history of medicine primarily in eighteenth and nineteenth-century France. She has written the essays "Disability History: Why We Need Another 'Other'" in the American Historical Review and "Comment: At the Borderland of Medical and Disability History" in the Bulletin of the History of Medicine. The later article was originally titled "Disability History and History of Medicine: Rival Siblings or Conjoined Twins?".

Kudlick has also published personal thought-pieces "Black Bike, White Cane: Timely Confessions of a Special Self" and "The Blind Man's Harley: White Canes and Gender Identity in Modern America", which was deemed a Notable Essay in 2005's Best American Essays. Her books include Reflections: the Life and Writings of a Young Blind Woman in Post Revolutionary France with Dr. Zina Weygand and Cholera in Post-Revolutionary Paris: A Cultural History. After the death of Paul K. Longmore in 2010, Kudlick oversaw the completion and publication of his book Telethons: Spectacle, Disability, and the Business of Charity.

== Sources ==
- French edition "Une Jeune aveugle dans la France du XIXème siècle Erès", 2004 "Our Ancestors the Sighted: Making Blind People French and French People Blind, 1750–1991" in Nancy Hirschmann and Beth Linker, eds. Civil Disabilities: Citizenship, Membership, and Belonging, University of Pennsylvania Press, 2015,143-164"Smallpox, Disability and Survival: Rewriting Paradigms from a New Epidemic Script" in Susan Burch and Michael Rembis, eds., Disability Histories University of Illinois Press, 2014, Chapter 9.
- "Guy de Maupassant, Louisa May Alcott, and Youth at Risk: Lessons from the New Paradigm of Disability" Paedagogica Historica International Journal of the History ofEducation,45: 1–2, (February–April 2009), 37–50.
- "Modernity's Miss-Fits: Blind Girls and Marriage in France and America, 1820–1920" in Rudolph Bell and Virginia Yans, eds., Women on Their Own: Interdisciplinary Perspectives on Being Single (Rutgers University Press) 2008. (German version,"Solten blinde Frauen heiraten? Behinderung und Ehe in modernen Frankreich und in den USA, "Die Welt als Barriere: Deutschsprachige Beitraege zu den Disability Studies, Erich Otto Graf, Cornelia Renggli, Jann Weissner, eds. Sozialthek, Zurich, 2006), 149-55.
- "Disability and 'Divorce': A Blind Parisian Cloth Merchant Contemplates his Options in 1756," in Gendering Disability, Bonnie G. Smith and Beth Hutchison, eds. (New Brunswick, Rutgers University Press, 2004)." The Outlook of The Problem and the Problem with The Outlook: Two Advocacy Journals Reinvent Blind People in Turn-of- the-Century America" in Paul K. Longmore and Lauri Umansky, eds., The New Disability History: American Perspectives, New York University Press, 2001, 187–213; reprinted as "A Historian's Look at The Problem at the Turn of the Century," Braille Monitor (December 2000), 948–62.
