= Bennett Friedman =

- Origin: Berkeley, California, U.S.
- Genres: Jazz, mainstream jazz
- Occupations: Musician, educator
- Instrument: Saxophone

Bennett Friedman is an American jazz tenor saxophonist. He attended Berkeley High School, Boston's Berklee College of Music, and San Francisco State University, where he was awarded a Master's Degree in Music (performance).

In addition to actively performing, Friedman is a well-known music educator in the San Francisco Bay area. Friedman directed the San Francisco State University Jazz Ensembles for 8 years and has taught on the faculty at Santa Rosa Junior College since 1977. Friedman was chair of the Music Department at Santa Rosa and head of Jazz Studies. He has taught and performed at the Stanford Jazz Workshop, and has been featured as a performer at the Healdsburg Jazz Festival, the Kuumba Jazz Center in Santa Cruz, and the Monterey Jazz Festival.

Friedman has been awarded the National Endowment For the Arts grant for jazz composition and has been commissioned works by the International Association of Jazz Educators, as well as by college music departments. Among the musicians who cite Friedman as a significant influence is saxophonist Tom Alexander, who describes Friedman as a "San Francisco Jazz legend."

== Publications ==
- "Variations On a Brazilian Song", Mission Music, 1971.
- Works commissioned by the National Association of Jazz Educators, National Endowment for the Arts, University of California Bands and College of San Mateo.
- Big band charts published by University of Northern Colorado Press.

== As sideman ==
- Peter Welker - We'll be Together Again (Brownstone - 1999)
- Dave Eshelman - Sea Breeze (Sea Breeze)
- Dave Eshelman - When Dreams Come True (Sea Breeze)
- Dave Eshelman - Temperature Rising (Sea Breeze)
- Dave Eshelman - The Jazz Garden (Sea Breeze)
