= Richard Dugdale (oceanographer) =

American oceanographer (1928–2026)

- Born: Richard Cooper Dugdale; February 6, 1928; Madison, Wisconsin, U.S.
- Died: January 21, 2026 (aged 97); Marin County, California, U.S.
- Education: University of Wisconsin–Madison
- Occupation: Oceanographer
- Spouse(s): Vera Alexander (divorced) Jane MacIsaac (died. 1982) Frances Wilkerson

Richard Cooper Dugdale (February 6, 1928 – January 21, 2026) was an American oceanographer.

== Life and career ==
Dugdale was born in Madison, Wisconsin, the son of Bryan and Esther Dugdale. He attended the University of Wisconsin–Madison, earning his BS degree in electrical engineering, his MS degree in botany and zoology and his PhD degree in zoology. After earning his degrees, he worked at the Institute of Marine Science at the University of Alaska Fairbanks, and wrote results of oceanographic cruises which helped distinguish new production in the ocean. His results were publicated as the Limnology and Oceanography papers.

In 1963, Dugdale was named a fellow of the American Association for the Advancement of Science. In his later years, he served as the Estuary and Ocean Science Center Research Professor in the department of biology at San Francisco State University.

== Personal life and death ==
Dugdale first married to Vera Alexander, but their marriage ended in divorce. He then married Jane MacIsaac. His second wife MacIsaac died in 1982. After the death of his second wife, he married Frances Wilkerson. Their marriage lasted until Dugdale's death in 2026.

Dugdale died on January 21, 2026 in Marin County, California, at the age of 97.
