= SFSU College of Ethnic Studies =

The College of Ethnic Studies at San Francisco State University was the first Ethnic studies college in the United States.

== History ==
In 1968, the Third World Liberation Front (TWLF) was created as a coalition of student groups at San Francisco State College (now San Francisco State University) and the University of California, Berkeley. The coalition opposed Eurocentrism in higher education and a lack of diversity.

In 1968 and 1969, the TWLF held the longest student strikes in American history at SF State College with the goal of having fifteen demands be met.

The college was founded in Fall 1969 to meet a portion of the demands.

In 2016, hundreds of students protested against budget cuts to the college and for the expansion of the college's programs.

Until 2019, the college was the only College of Ethnic Studies in the United States. The second College of Ethnic Studies was established at California State University, Los Angeles.
