= Robert A. Jensen =

American writer and crisis management expert

- Born: Robert Andrew Jensen; 1965 (age 60–61); Bay Area, California
- Education: California State University, Fresno
- Occupation: Chairman of Kenyon International · Writer · Crisis Management Expert
- Years active: 1998–present
- Spouse: Brandon D. Jones
- Website: robertajensen.com

Robert A. Jensen (born 1965) is an American writer and crisis management expert. He is best known for his responses to the Oklahoma City Bombing, 9/11, Hurricane Katrina and the 2004 Indian Ocean earthquake and tsunami.

== Biography ==
Jensen was born in the Bay Area, California, and spent most of his childhood on the west coast. His last two years of high school were completed in Florida at Admiral Farragut Academy, a Naval Honor Military high school whose alumni include Alan Shepard and Charles Duke. He graduated from California State University, Fresno with a degree in criminology – law enforcement.

Jensen was commissioned as a US Army officer in 1986 with an initial assignment in field artillery at Fort Sill, but soon took the Pershing Officer Course that led him to become a launch control officer in Germany. While serving, Jensen was also the commander of the 54th Quartermaster Company – Mortuary Affairs. As commander, he responded to incidents such as the 1996 Croatia USAF CT-43 crash and the Oklahoma City bombing.

Jensen is the former chairman of Kenyon International Emergency Services. He has directed and been involved in response and recovery efforts for numerous international large-scale crises, typically terrorist attacks, criminal and civil investigations, natural disasters, and countless transportation accidents – most involving large-scale loss of life. These have included complex events such as bombings in the UN Headquarters in Baghdad, 2002 Bali bombings, the September 11 attacks, seizure of the In Amenas gas plant, the 2015 Sousse attacks, the 2004 Indian Ocean earthquake and tsunami, the 2010 Haiti earthquake, Hurricane Katrina and multiple large-scale aircraft, rail and maritime disasters.

Jensen has contributed to international and national news outlets, including Business Insider, NPR and Univision, as to what families and the general public could expect after the Surfside condominium building collapse. The New York Times, Associated Press and BuzzFeed News interviewed Jensen regarding the number of COVID-19 fatalities in New York City. He has provided behind the scenes interviews to The Houston Chronicle, GQ Magazine and The Telegraph about crisis and disaster management. Jensen has also provided commentary on leadership, crises and their aftermath on the Oklahoma City Bombing, 9/11, Bombing of UN Headquarters in Iraq, Hurricane Katrina, 2004 Asian Tsunami, 2010 Haitian Earthquake, Grenfell Tower Fire, Pandemic and multiple aircraft disasters including Germanwings Flight FU 9525, Helios Flight 522, Malaysia Airlines Flight 17 and Malaysia Airlines Flight 370 to media outlets including the Associated Press, Reuters, The New York Times, Wall Street Journal, The Telegraph, BBC, CNN and Sky News.

He has published one technical book and several crisis management articles in publications such as the Houston Business Journal. His first book, Mass Fatality and Casualty Incidents: A Field Guide, a guide to disaster responses to events that result in mass fatalities, was published by CRC Press, a division of British multinational publisher, Routledge, Jensen's second book, Personal Effects: What Recovering the Dead Teaches Me About Caring for the Living, was published in September 2021 by St. Martin's Press.

== Personal life ==
Jensen is married to Brandon Jones and has one daughter.

== Bibliography ==
- Mass Fatality and Casualty Incidents: A Field Guide. CRC Press. 1999. ISBN 9780849312953.
- Personal Effects: What Recovering the Dead Teaches Me About Caring for the Living. St. Martin’s Press. 2021. ISBN 9781250267993.

== Sources ==
- Wickham, Tim (July 21, 2021). "Spotlight: Robert A. Jensen on leadership, responsibility and crisis management". The Business Magazine.
- Leyl, Sharanjit (March 26, 2014). "Malaysia Airlines' Crisis Communications". BBC.
- Baxter, Alice (August 4, 2015). "Malaysia Airlines Flight 370 Aircraft Wing Found". BBC.
- Baldwin, Brooke (July 23, 2014). "First Flight 17 Victims Now at Dutch Forensics Lab". CNN.
- Wilson, Andrew (March 26, 2014). "Malaysia Airlines Crisis Management and Crisis Communications". Sky News.
- Findell, Elizabeth (February 24, 2021). "Tallying Texas Deaths Could Take Months". The Wall Street Journal.
- Hays, Holly (April 25, 2021). "15 agonizing hours" (PDF). The Indianapolis Star.
- Katz, Josh (April 10, 2020). "Deaths in New York City Are More Than Double the Usual Total". The New York Times.
- Gresko, Jessica (April 4, 2020). "Where will the bodies go? Morgues plan as virus grows". The Associated Press.
- Prakash, Nidhi (March 25, 2020). "Doctors And Nurses Say More People Are Dying Of COVID-19 In The US Than We Know". BuzzFeed News.
- Williams, Sally (April 13, 2018). "Grenfell: After the tragedy what's become of the survivors?". The Telegraph. London: Telegraph Media Group.
- Drane, Amanda (July 11, 2021). "Master of Disaster" (PDF). Houston Chronicle.
