= Amy L. Alexander =

American journalist

- Born: May 4, 1963 (age 63); San Francisco, California, U.S.
- Education: San Francisco State University (BA)
- Occupations: Journalist, author, columnist
- Website: http://amyalexanderink.com/

Amy L. Alexander (born May 4, 1963) is an American journalist. Her work has appeared in The Washington Post, NPR, The Root, and The Nation. She is the author of four nonfiction books.

== Life and education ==
Alexander was born in San Francisco, California. She attended San Francisco State University, where she received a B.A. in Magazine Journalism.

== Journalism career ==
Alexander began her career in 1988 as a campus correspondent for the San Francisco Examiner, resulting in a full-time staff position there in 1989. After the Examiner, Alexander wrote for the Fresno Bee, where she helped cover the 1992 Los Angeles riots. Alexander next wrote for the Miami Herald for almost four years, covering ethnic groups in South Florida. Alexander later wrote for The Boston Globe, Chicago Tribune, and The Washington Post. She was also a media columnist at Africana.com, which later changed to AOL BlackVoices.com. Alexander has been a commentator on NPR, as well as an associate producer for NPR's Tell Me More, with Michel Martin.

Awards, Honors: In May 2012, Alexander was named Alumna of the Year by the Journalism Department at San Francisco State University. In 2008, Alexander was The Alfred Knobler Journalism Fellow The Nation Institute and wrote articles and columns for The Nation. In 2001, she received the Survivor Award from The American Foundation for Suicide Prevention.

As of August 2013, Alexander was publisher of Amy Alexander Community Forum.

== Bibliography ==
- The Farrakhan Factor: African-American Writers on Leadership, Nationhood, and Minister Louis Farrakhan (Grove Press, 1998)
- Lay My Burden Down: Suicide and the Mental Health Crisis Among African-Americans, with Alvin F. Poussaint (Beacon Press, 2000)
- Fifty Black Women Who Changed America (Kensington Books, 2003)
- Uncovering Race: A Black Journalist's Story of Reporting and Reinvention (Beacon Press, 2011)
