= Mahmood Monshipouri =

Iranian-born American educator, author and scholar

- محمود منشی‌پوری
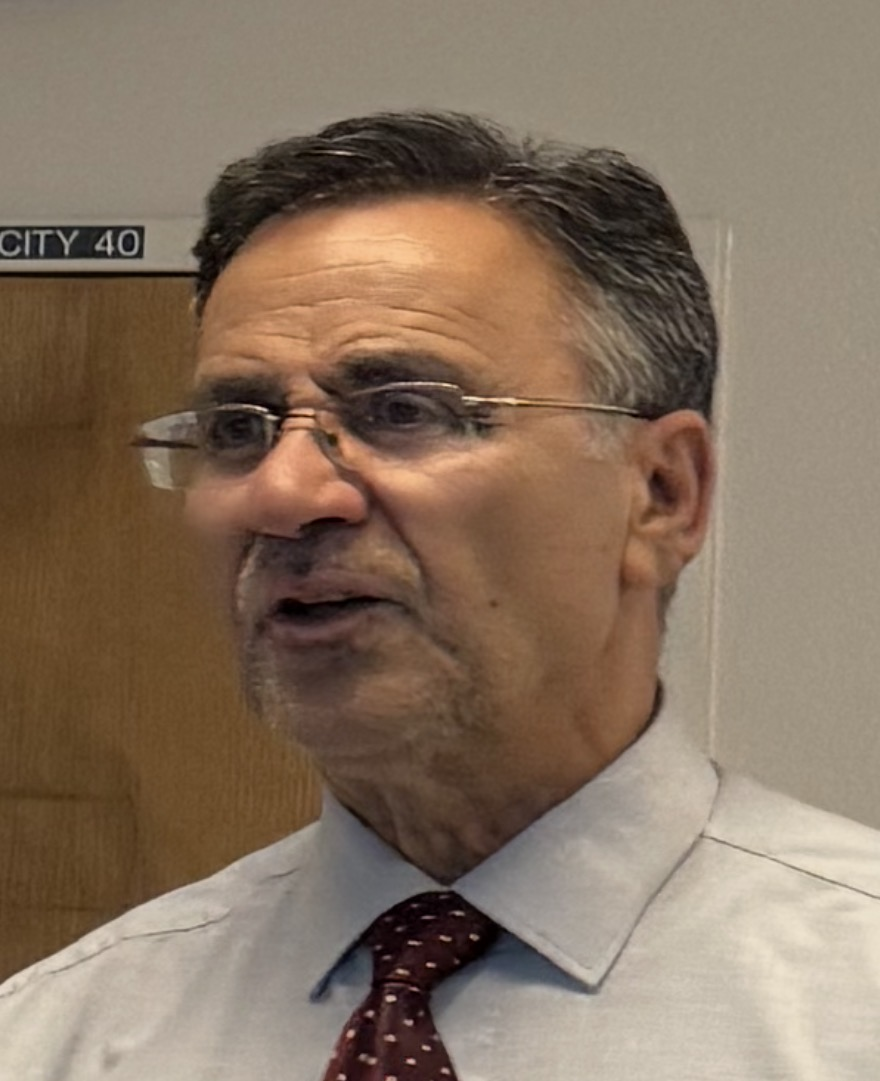
- Monshipouri in 2026
- Born: Mahmood Monshipouri; March 26, 1952 (age 74); Ahvaz, Iran

Academic background
- Education: Shahid Rajaee Teacher Training University (BA); Allameh Tabataba'i University (MA); University of Georgia (PhD)

Academic work
- Discipline: International relations
- Institutions: University of Georgia; Central Michigan University; Alma College; Quinnipiac University; California State University, San Marcos; Redlands University; San Francisco State University
- Main interests: Human rights Refugee studies Globalization in the Middle East; Middle East and North Africa

Mahmood Monshipouri (Persian: محمود منشی‌پوری; born March 26, 1952) is an Iranian-American educator, author, and scholar. He is a professor of international relations at San Francisco State University.

Born and raised in Ahvaz, Monshipouri moved to Tehran at age 16 to continue his education, earning a bachelor's degree in early childhood education from Shahid Rajaee Teacher Training University in 1975. While studying in Tehran, Monshipouri became interested in politics and earned a master's degree in political science from Allameh Tabataba'i University in 1979. After receiving his master's degree, he immigrated to the United States to pursue his postdoctoral studies, ultimately earning a doctorate from the University of Georgia in 1987.

Monshipouri previously taught at his alma mater, the University of Georgia, as an instructor from 1985 to 1986; as well as taught at Central Michigan University as an adjunct assistant professor from 1988 to 1993; Alma College as a professor from 1986 to 1998; and at Quinnipiac University as a professor in the Department of Political Science from 1998. Since 2007, he has taught international relations at San Francisco State University.
