= Susannah Israel =

American artist (born 1954)

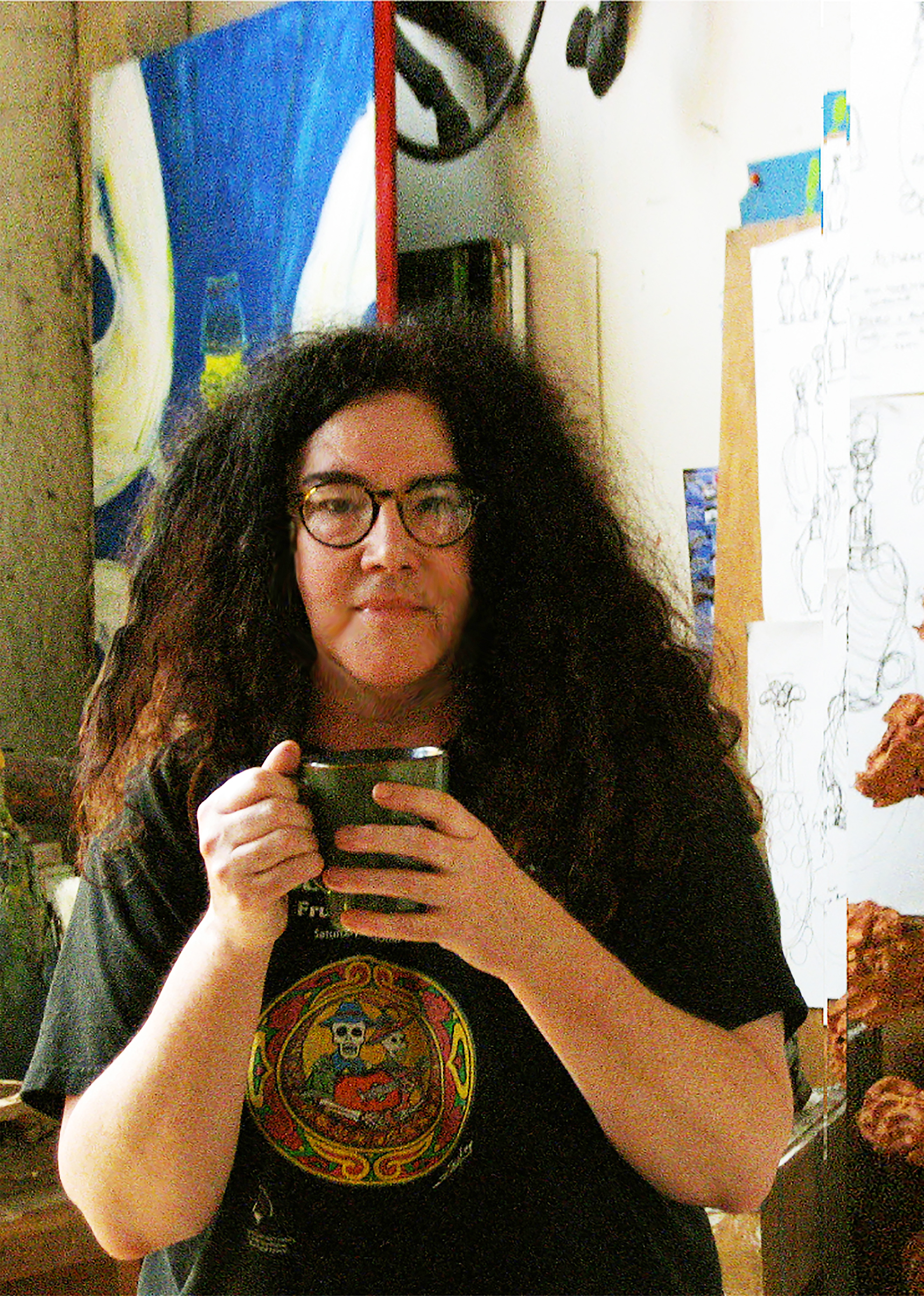
Susannah Israel, 2021

Susannah Israel (born 1954) is an American sculptor, ceramicist, educator, writer, and composer. Israel has published writing since 2000, and musical compositions since 2013. She lives in East Oakland, California.

== Early life, and education ==
Susannah Israel was born in 1954, in New York City. Israel graduated from a high school in the small village of Wappingers Falls, New York, where she was awarded the Regents Honors Scholarship to Pratt Art Institute in New York City in 1972.

A few years later, from 1983 to 1987, Israel attended San Francisco State University, earning a Bachelor of Arts degree in art and chemistry, and then returned in 1997 to acquire a Master of Fine Arts degree in 2000.

== Teaching career ==
In the early 1970s, Israel began teaching art and ceramics. In Fall 2000, Israel served as a one-term, full-time sculpture and ceramics teacher at California State University, Bakersfield. From 2002 to 2018, she taught ceramics and sculpture at Laney College, a community college in Oakland, California where she also served as art department co-chair. Israel taught art history and ceramic sculpture at Merritt College, a community college in Oakland, California from 2003 to 2018. Israel received a distinguished faculty service award for her teaching as an adjunct professor of art at the Contra Costa Colleges community college in San Pablo, California, from 2002 to 2006.

== Fellowships, residencies, and collectives ==
Israel is the only artist from the United States to receive the Fletcher Challenge Premier Award in 1993. Her winning entry, Lobo California, is in the collection of the Auckland War Memorial Museum in Auckland, New Zealand.

== Collections ==
- Mint Museum, Charlotte, North Carolina

=== Public and sited work ===
- American Museum of Ceramic Art
- Archie Bray Foundation for the Ceramic Arts
- Auckland War Memorial Museum
- California State University at Bakersfield
- Gladding McBean
- Madison Public Library, Wisconsin
- City of Moraga Art In Public Spaces. Moraga California
- Ocotillo School in Tucson, Arizona
- Orinda Public Art Program, Orinda Library, California
- San Angelo Museum of Fine Arts, San Angelo Texas
- The Sculptor's Dominion, San Antonio, Texas
