= Bebe Stores =

American retail brand

Bebe Stores, Inc.
- Type: Public
- Traded as: OTCQB: BDST
- Industry: Retail
- Founded: June 7, 1976; 50 years ago, in San Francisco, California, U.S.
- Founder: Manny Mashouf
- Headquarters: 400 Valley Drive, Brisbane, California, U.S.
- Number of locations: 1 (website)
- Key people: Manny Mashouf (CEO), Kenneth M. Young (Director), Perry Mandarino (Director)
- Products: Apparel
- Revenue: ▲US$603 million (FY 2009)
- Operating income: ▲US$16.6 million (FY 2009)
- Net income: ▲US$12.6 million (FY 2009)
- Total assets: ▼US$571 million (FY 2009)
- Total equity: ▼US$459 million (FY 2009)
- Number of employees: 4,433 (2008)
- Website: www.bebe.com

Bebe Stores, Inc. /biːbiː/ (stylized in all lowercase) is a women's retail brand that was established in 1976. The brand develops and produces a line of women's apparel, accessories, and perfume fragrances, which it markets under the "Bebe" or "Bebe Sport" or "Bebe Outlet" names.

On April 21, 2017, Bebe announced it would close its remaining 168 brick-and-mortar locations to sell products online as web sales.

== History ==
The company was founded by Iranian-American businessman Manny Mashouf in 1976, where he opened the first Bebe store in San Francisco during a time when three categories dominated the women's wear market: junior, bridge and misses.

The name "Bebe" is derived from the soliloquy from Shakespeare's play Hamlet in which the eponymous Prince ponders: "To be or not to be..." However, the company's name was "Babe, Inc." until it held its initial public offering in 1998.

Mashouf has owned approximately 55% of the company. It was announced in 2015 that Mashouf was to sell his 59% stake in Bebe.

In 2014, a Telephone Consumer Protection Act class action lawsuit was filed against Bebe Stores, Inc. The plaintiff sought to certify a nationwide class consisting of all people who provided their cell phone numbers to Bebe at one of its brick-and-mortar stores and subsequently received text messages from Bebe at any point from January 2010 through the present (the Class Period was later certified to begin October 16, 2013, when governing law took effect).

In March 2017, Bebe announced that it would close all stores in 2017, and become an online-only retailer.

Bebe has partnered with Global Brands Group to keep its e-commerce and its international stores in operations since June 2017. A new lifestyle concept store was opened in New York City in March 2018.

In May 2020, Centric Brands, who licensed the Bebe brand, filed for Chapter 11 bankruptcy protection due to the effects of the COVID-19 pandemic. Bebe was listed as an entity in the bankruptcy, as Centric Bebe, LLC.

== Stores ==
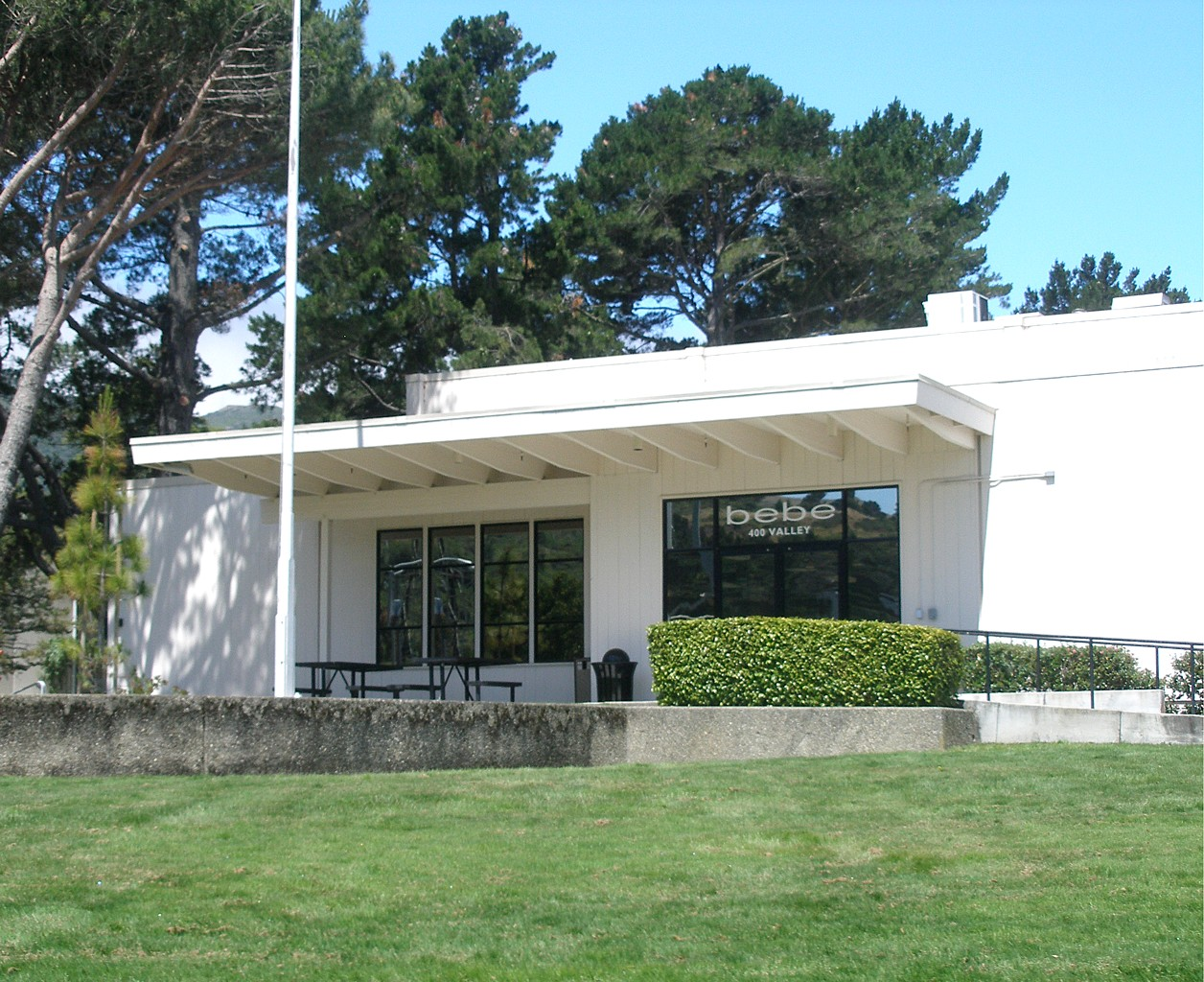
Bebe stores headquarters in Brisbane

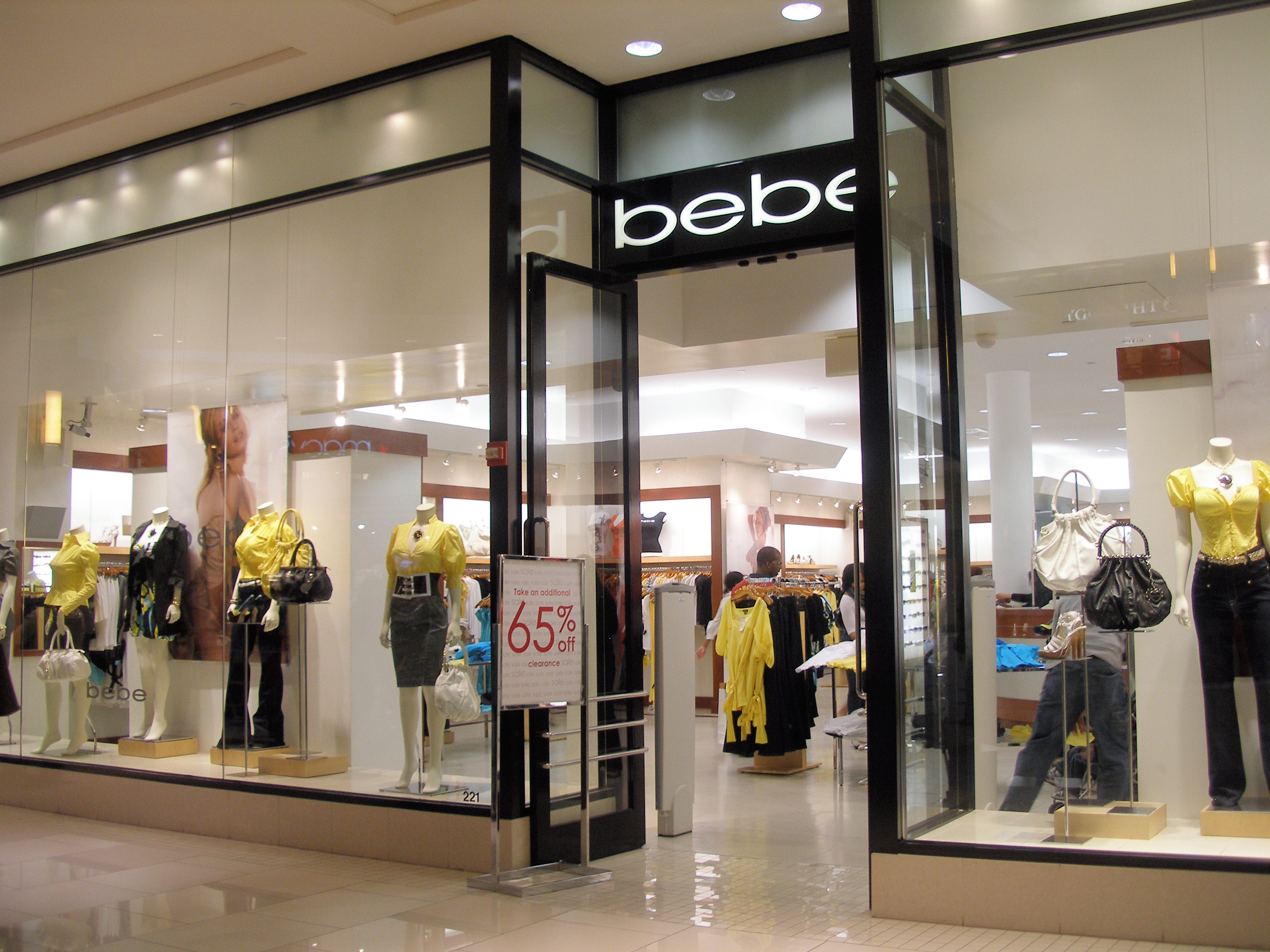
A Bebe store at Aventura Mall in Aventura, Florida.

The company has operated 312 stores, of which 215 are Bebe stores, 32 are 2b Bebe stores, 64 are BebeSport stores (this includes Bebe BebeSport 2-in-1 stores), and one is a Bebe accessories store. These are located in the United States, Puerto Rico, the U.S. Virgin Islands and Canada. Bebe also has international divisions in Lebanon, Kuwait, Egypt, Israel, Singapore, Indonesia, Malaysia, Mexico, Russia, Saudi Arabia, Thailand, Turkey, and UAE.

In 1976, the first store was launched on Polk Street in San Francisco as Bebe. The company launched BebeSport in year 2003 to focus on active lifestyle by means of sportswear, tops, sweaters, outerwear, and accessories. In 2009, BebeSport stores were converted to PH8, with BebeSport product now sold in Bebe and 2b Bebe stores. The company converted BebeSport stores to PH8 stores in November 2009. PH8 offers casual weekend apparel, work-out attire and accessories such as bags, shoes and seasonal items. Bebe's outlet division 2b Bebe provided clearance merchandise, logo merchandise and special cuts produced under the 2b Bebe label exclusively for the outlet stores.

In 2012, Bebe launched a bridal wear line which was available in stores throughout the United States. The line debuted with a collection designed by Project Runway runner up Rami Kashou. Additional bridal salons were under consideration; however, the business venture was eventually ditched due to poor sales.

On April 21, 2017, Bebe made an announcement that it would close its remaining 175 brick-and-mortar locations. The company anticipated a charge of approximately $20 million as a result of the store closures. The company said it expected to incur losses in sales with the closures, but did not disclose the estimate.

In January 2019, Bebe launched a revamped e-commerce platform and loyalty program developed by outsourced e-commerce company Branded Online.

== Marketing ==
To further brand exposure, the company signs celebrities for ad campaigns. Brenda Song was the face of Bebe's 2007 ad campaign. The company signed actresses Rebecca Romijn as the face of Bebe from spring 2007 through spring 2008 and Eva Longoria as the face of BebeSport from spring 2007 through spring 2009. Mischa Barton was the face of Bebe's 2006 ad campaign.

In 2007, Bebe selected advertising agency MD70, with creative direction by Fredrik Peterhoff to produce Bebe Holiday, Bebe Sports, and Bebe Accessories' spring 2009 campaigns. Photographed by Camilla Åkrans, styled by Julia von Boehm and shot in Beverly Hills, Los Angeles, the Bebe spring campaign featured model Anne Marie van Dijk. The campaign appeared in the February and March issues of Vogue, Elle, Cosmopolitan, and Glamour, as well as on billboards and phone kiosks in New York, Los Angeles, and Las Vegas. A campaign video ran in stores and online on the Bebe YouTube channel. Singer Bebe Rexha was the promotion campaign face in 2019.

=== Events ===
Bebe has semi-annual collection preview events where clients are invited to preview the latest collections at Bebe stores. The company partners with national and regional magazines to host events benefiting non-profit organizations.

== Design and manufacturing ==
The company designs and develops the majority of merchandise in-house with outsourced manufacturing.

== Executives ==
On August 9, 2010, Emilia Fabricant became president of Bebe Stores. She reported directly to CEO Manny Mashouf and her core responsibilities included oversight of design, marketing, merchandising, Internet sales, production, and retail planning. In 2012 she left to take a position at Aéropostale. Mashouf decided to take a lesser role as a non-executive chairman and hired Steve Birkhold as CEO. Birkhold has extensive experience in retail as US CEO of Diesel Jeans and CEO of Lacoste. Upon Birkhold's resignation in June 2014, the board of directors appointed Jim Wiggett, currently chief executive officer of Jackson Hole Group, as interim chief executive officer of Bebe. On December 15, 2014, Bebe announced that Wiggett had been named chief executive officer and appointed to the company's board of directors, effective immediately.

== See also ==
- Retail apocalypse
- List of retailers affected by the retail apocalypse
