= History of San Francisco State University =

The history of San Francisco State University began in 1857, with a teacher-training program at a high school, which led to the creation of San Francisco State Normal School. It became San Francisco State Teachers College, San Francisco State College, and California State University, San Francisco before becoming San Francisco State University, as it's known today.

== 19th century ==
In 1857, the San Francisco Board of Education created the San Francisco Weekly Normal School, also known as the Minns' Evening Normal School. In 1862, it became the California State Normal School, the first postsecondary institution established by the state. Only six students were enrolled on its first day. By 1866, enrollment had increased to 384.

In 1867, the principal of Girls' High School and Normal School, Ellis Holmes, realized that the California State Normal School was not meeting the demand for teachers. The city approved the addition of a new year-long teacher-training program to his high school's curriculum, for girls who wanted to pursue a career in education. This program is what would eventually become San Francisco State University. When the California State Normal School was moved to San José in 1871, Girls' High became the only publicly-supported teacher-training institution.

In 1895, the teaching program was split from the school and became San Francisco City Normal School. Due to a lack of funding, the school closed in 1898. A group of teachers, students, and supporters pressured the California State Legislature to convert it into a state-funded institution.

=== Founding ===
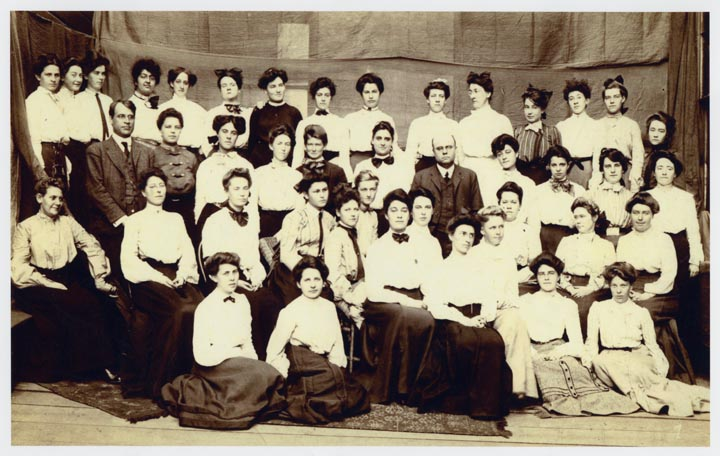
The graduating class of San Francisco State Normal School in June 1906.

On March 22, 1899, the California State Legislature approved the creation of the San Francisco State Normal School, with an appropriation of $10,000. Frederic Lister Burk was appointed as the first president and chose the school's motto, Experientia Docet. The school rented space in a building on Powell Street between Clay and Sacramento Streets and 31 women were enrolled in the first year.

== 20th century ==
The 1906 earthquake and fire forced the school to relocate from Nob Hill to a temporary campus at the Grant School in Oakland. Ten days after the earthquake, President Burk found a new site for the school at a property bound by Laguna, Haight, Buchanan and Hermann Streets.

In 1921, the school began offering Bachelor's degree options and was renamed San Francisco State Teachers College. Teachers Colleges in California received authorization to grant Bachelor of Arts degrees in 1923.

In 1924, Burk died and Archibald B. Anderson took over as acting president.

Also in 1924, construction for new buildings started on vacant land at the school's site. The campus consisted of four Spanish Colonial Revival style buildings designed by George McDougall, a California state architect.

There were three presidents of the teachers college in 1927. Anderson served until his death in the summer of that year. Then, Mary A. Ward, the Dean of Women, served as acting president until the fall, when Alexander C. Roberts was appointed president.

In the 1930s, overcrowding became an issue at the campus. It had been designed for 1500 students, but had to accommodate about 3000. When the Hetch Hetchy project was completed in 1934, the city no longer needed land near Lake Merced for a reservoir. In 1938, students rallied for a new campus with non-wooden buildings; San Francisco's 1906 earthquake and fire made students feel unsafe in crowded wooden buildings. By 1939, the land had been acquired to build a new campus, but plans were paused due to World War II. Many students took part in the war, causing enrollment to decline.

During the 1920s and '30s, State Teachers Colleges expanded beyond being only vocational schools to train teachers. They were formally authorized to offer four-year liberal arts curriculums and renamed State Colleges in 1935. So, the school became known as San Francisco State College.

When veterans started returning in 1945, the Vets Village, a housing complex, was built at the site of the new campus. Some students commuted from there to the campus at Buchanan and Haight Streets. In the same year, J. Paul Leonard became president after Alexander C. Roberts retired.

In 1949, master's degrees were authorized to be offered.

In 1951, the Gymnasium building was the first major building to be completed at the current campus near Lake Merced. The Creative Arts building was built second. The campus opened for classes for Fall 1953, before it was formally dedicated in October 1954.

In 1956, the Frederic Burk School opened. The elementary school served as a demonstration lab for new teaching methods until its closure in 1971. It was also a teaching lab for college students earning degrees in education, under the supervision of experienced teachers. Curriculum included music instruction.

From 1957 to 1961, Glenn S. Dumke was president of San Francisco State.

San Francisco State College became part of the California State College system established under the Donahoe Higher Education Act in 1960. Dumke resigned to become the system's vice chancellor for academic affairs, before becoming the second chancellor of the system for 20 years.

In Fall 1965, the Experimental College was started by students Cynthia Carlson, Donna Michaelson, Sharon Gold, and James Nixon, in an effort to teach untraditionally. In 1927, over 2000 students enrolled in courses offered by the Experimental College. The original Experimental College stopped operating after 1969.

A 760-bed, 15-story dorm building, Verducci Hall, was built near Lake Merced Boulevard in 1969.

=== Demonstrations of the 1960s ===
==== 1967 ====
On May 2, 1967, 60 students staged a sit-in protest in President John Summerskill's office, opposing the practice of providing students' academic standing to the Selective Service System. On June 22 of the same year, students and faculty picketed administrative offices to protest the California State College Chancellor Glenn S. Dumke's directive to continue providing students' academic standings.

On November 6, James Vaszko, the campus editor of the Gater, the student newspaper at the time, was assaulted by members of the Black Student Union. This event became known as the Gater Incident. In an interview the day after the assault, Vaszko said he had no idea why it happened, but something was said during the incident about the Gater not running a photo of the BSU candidate for homecoming queen. However, the Gater had included a photo of the candidate. The District Attorney's office issued arrest warrants on November 9 for three individuals.

About 450 students participated in a protest on December 2 against President Summerskill and the Vietnam War.

On December 6, students protested against the suspension of students in the Gater incident. During the protest, students broke into the Administration building.

==== 1968 ====
President Summerskill announced his resignation, effective in September, on February 22.

The Third World Liberation Front was a coalition of the Black Students Union, the Latin American Students Organization, the Filipino-American Students Organization, and El Renacimiento. They occupied the school's YMCA office on March 23.

On May 21, in the Administration building, approximately 400 students held a sit-in protesting various issues, including an end to AFROTC on campus and the hiring of nine minority faculty members. After nine hours, police were called to remove the students. 26 people were arrested.

Students protested again on May 23. On the following day, Chancellor Dumke asked President Summerskill to resign immediately. Robert Smith, a professor of education, was appointed president on June 1.

On September 10, George Mason Murray, a graduate student in English and Black Panther Minister of Education, was hired as a teaching assistant to teach introductory English classes for 400 students.

President Smith announced the creation of a Black Studies Department and named Dr. Nathan Hare, a professor of sociology, as acting chair on September 18.

On September 26, after Murray allegedly made inflammatory remarks at Fresno State College and San Francisco State, the California State College Trustees voted to ask President Smith to reassign George Murray to a non-teaching position.

Smith refused, causing Chancellor Dumke to order him to suspend Murray on October 31. On the same day, the Black Student Union Third World Liberation Front threatened to strike on November 6 and presented their 15 demands. The demands were not met, and a lengthy student strike erupted. It was the longest student strike in American history.

On November 13, 1968, the campus closed after a week of confrontations between students and police. On November 18, the California State College Trustees ordered Smith to reopen the campus. The faculty didn't want to reopen the campus, but met for a convocation to discuss the issues. On November 26, Black Student Union leaders confronted Smith and the faculty during the convocation. Smith resigned the same day.

On December 2, S. I. Hayakawa was appointed president. On his first day, he climbed onto a sound truck positioned at 19th and Holloway Avenues. and pulled out the speaker wires. According to a student who was inside the truck, "he was so mad, you could see the foam on his mouth."

On December 10, Mayor Joseph Alioto organized a citizen's committee to help end the strike.

The school closed for the holidays a week early, on December 13.

Also during that month, two bombs were discovered on campus. One was in the Administration building and the other was in the Psychology building (now Ethnic Studies and Psychology building).

==== 1969 ====
On January 4, 1969, President Hayakawa banned meetings and gatherings on campus and limited picketing activities to the perimeter of the campus. Picketers ignored the ban.

About 350 teachers who were part of the American Federation of Teachers picketed around the campus on January 6.

On January 23, over 500 people had gathered on campus for a rally. Police surrounded the protestors and arrested hundreds of them, backing up San Francisco's court system for months.

On March 5, Timothy Peebles, a freshman, set off a bomb in the Creative Arts building at night. The bomb injured his hands and face.

The strike officially ended on March 21, after an agreement was signed the previous day by representatives of the Black Student Union, the Third World Liberation Front, and the school. The school agreed to establish the first College of Ethnic Studies in the country, housing the departments of American Indian Studies, Asian American Studies, Black Studies, and La Raza Studies, and to accept almost all nonwhite applicants for the Fall 1969 semester.

In Fall 1969, Richard Oakes led a group of SF State students in the occupation of Alcatraz Island.

=== 1970s and onwards ===
In 1971, campus-based childcare at SF State was approved by the California State Colleges board of trustees. On October 10, 1972, the Associated Students Lilliput Childcare Center opened, providing childcare to students who are parents and the general public. It's now called the AS Early Childhood Education Center.

In 1972, the State Colleges system was designated "The California State University and Colleges." 14 colleges met the criteria established by the Board of Trustees and the Coordinating Council for Higher Education, including San Francisco State, which was renamed California State University, San Francisco. This name was not popular with students, and the university was soon renamed San Francisco State University in 1974.

Hayakawa resigned in 1973. This led to the appointment of Paul F. Romberg.

The Student Union building (now Student Center) was opened in 1975. It was designed by Paffard Keatinge-Clay.

On March 10, 1975, American Nazi leader Alan Vincent was invited to speak to a class. Students protested against his presence on campus and disrupted the class he was supposed to be in. He was in an office across from the classroom. Students filled the hallway and waited for him and other Nazis to leave. Police escorted them to 19th and Holloway Avenues as protestors chased them. There, a physical altercation took place that ended with a Nazi spraying a fire extinguisher at a protestor. The Nazis quickly went into a van and drove away.

President Romberg secured a permanent federal lease for 25 acres of shoreline in Tiburon for just $1 in 1978. The Romberg Tiburon Campus would eventually expand to 53 acres.

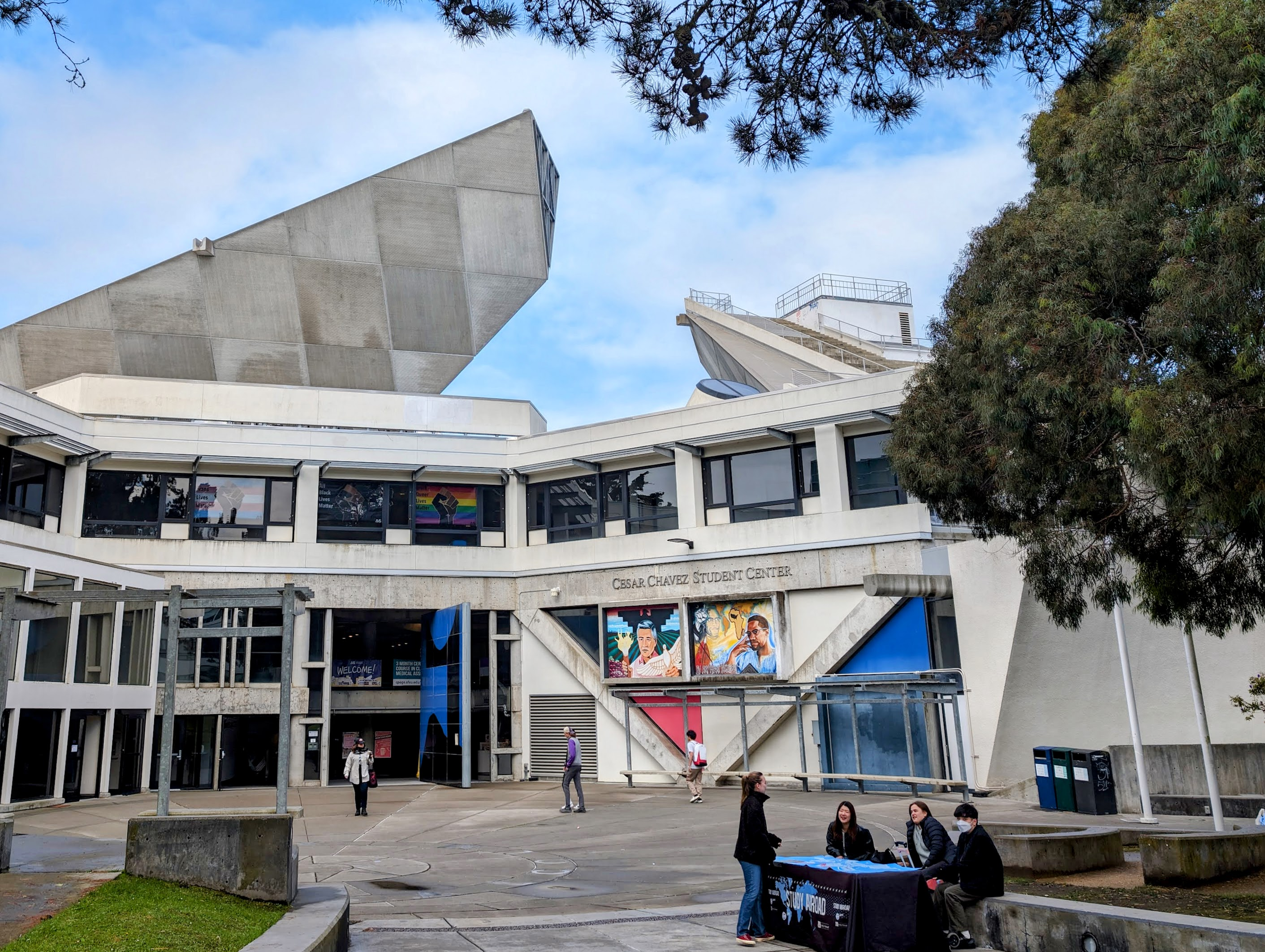
Student Center

In 1983, Chia-Wei Woo became the 11th president of the university. Woo was the first Chinese-American to head a major American university.

On May 14, 1985, a pipe bomb in a purse was found in the Business/Ethnic Studies Building (now Business Building). A US Army bomb disposal team removed it. In September that year, Coy Ray Phelps was arrested and charged for the attempted bombing. Phelps had also planted bombs in four other locations in San Francisco, but only one exploded at the offices of the local Humanist Party. On September 17, 1986, Phelps was placed in a psychiatric facility after being found not guilty by reason of insanity. He was released in 1999, but after starting a website that advocated for murdering Black people and Jewish people, a panel of three judges ruled that he should not have been released in the first place, and he was rearrested in 2002. He appealed the ruling, but his case was dismissed in 2004. On September 23, 2015, he was released from the United States Medical Center for Federal Prisoners.

After suffering damage from the 1989 Loma Prieta earthquake, Verducci Hall was permanently closed.

In 1993, the College of Extended Learning (now College of Global and Professional Education) opened the Downtown Center in San Francisco's Multimedia Gulch, at 425 Market St.

In 1994, a mural depicting Malcolm X was painted on the Student Union building, commissioned by the Pan-African Student Union and African Student Alliance. The mural's border contained yellow Stars of David and dollar signs mingled with skulls and crossbones and near the words "African Blood." The next week, after demonstrations on both sides, the university's administration had the mural painted over, and subsequently sand blasted. Two years later, a new Malcolm X mural was painted, without the controversial symbols.

In 1995, San Francisco State alumni Geoff Marcy and Paul Butler discovered two new Jupiter-sized planets within 35 light-years of Earth, including one that could contain elements for organic life. They discovered another planet about 40 light years away less than three months later.

On March 28, 1999, construction began on the Village at Centennial Square, a low-rise, mixed-use, 760-bed complex to replace the housing provided by Verducci Hall. The same day, Verducci Hall was imploded. The site now has tennis courts and a recreation field.

== 21st century ==
In 2007, the Downtown Campus was opened at 835 Market Street, replacing the Downtown Center. The campus had nearly 47,000 square feet of classroom space in Westfield San Francisco Centre. The campus was used for courses in the College of Extended Learning and Lam Family College of Business.

In 2009, the Children's Campus opened to provide childcare, primarily to faculty and staff.

The first Rhythms Music Festival happened in March 2011. The annual music festival is held in a building called the Annex.

In the summer of 2011, the university's eight academic colleges at the time were reorganized into the six academic colleges that currently exist (the College of Extended Learning was not considered an academic college.) This reorganization was the result of a budget crisis.

The university was designated by the US Department of Education as an Asian American, Native American, and Pacific Islander Serving Institution in 2012.

In 2013, the Science Building was found to have "unsafe levels" of airborne mercury, lead and asbestos in the basement as a result of reports that pesticide-laden Native American artifacts were previously stored with a material now known to be highly hazardous. Over $3.6 million was spent for remediation of the pervasive contamination. University administration terminated several employees who reported the contamination, resulting in several wrongful termination and whistle-blower lawsuits, including one by the recently hired director. In July 2014, Cal/OSHA cited the university for various health and safety violations in the Science Building, which included SFSU failing to locate asbestos in the building and warn employees about the hazards of mercury. SFSU previously ran into trouble with its Environmental Health and Safety program when the director prior, Robert Shearer, was accused of accepting bribes from a waste disposal firm in exchange for at least $4 million in university funds.

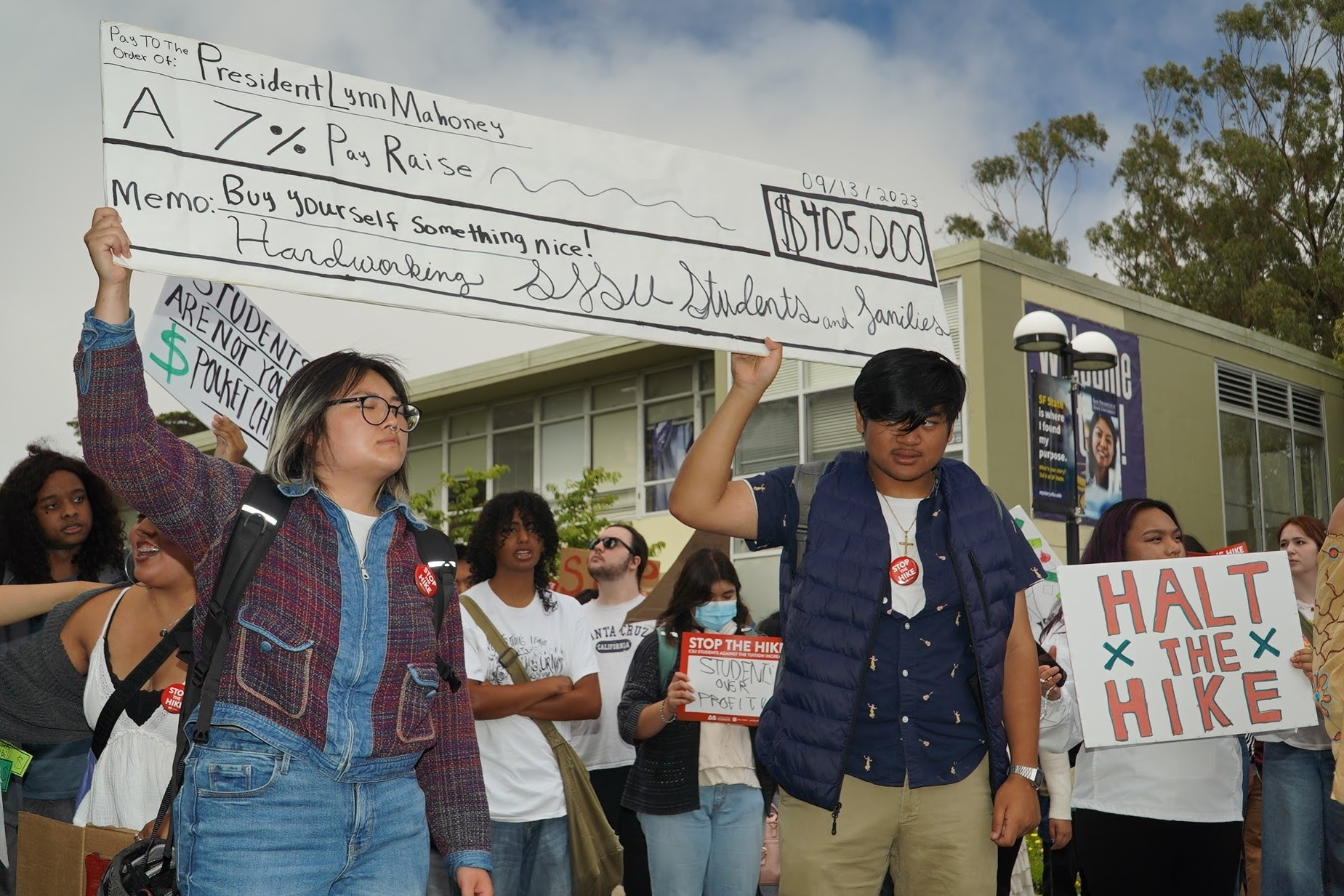
Students at San Francisco State University rallied and marched in protest of the CSU tuition increase on September 11, 2023.

The university was designated by the US Department of Education as a Hispanic Serving Institution in 2016.

In March 2016, a video of a student being attacked for having dreadlocks went viral and sparked discussions about cultural appropriation.

In response to the College of Ethnic Studies being underfunded since 2008, four students held a ten-day hunger strike from May 2–11, 2016, resulting in one hospitalization. The strike ended when President Leslie Wong agreed to commit nearly $500,000 to the college and meet a portion of their demands.

The Experimental College was revived in Fall 2017. One-unit courses are created and taught by students.

Also in 2017, a group of Jewish students and local residents accused SFSU of encouraging antisemitism and excluding Jewish student pro-Israel activist groups from campus activities. The students filed two lawsuits focusing on the disruption of a speech by Jerusalem mayor Nir Barkat in 2016. One suit was dismissed by a federal judge in 2018. Another lawsuit was settled in 2019 and included provisions for a $200,000 university fund to promote viewpoint diversity, a new coordinator of Jewish Student Life position for at least four years, and an independent consultant to review the university's non-discrimination policies.

In May 2019, Lynn Mahoney became the first woman to become president of San Francisco State in a permanent capacity. Mary Ward had served as an acting president in the summer of 1927, after the death of Archibald Anderson.

On September 23, 2020, SFSU faculty Rabab Abdulhadi and Tomomi Kinukawa hosted a discussion on Zoom titled "Whose Narratives? Gender, Justice, and Resistance." The event's speakers included Leila Khaled, a Palestinian political activist and plane hijacker, and Laura Whitehorn, an American political activist and domestic bomber. Zoom and YouTube canceled the broadcast due to Khaled's history of violent actions towards civilians. Facebook also removed a page for the event. President Lynn Mahoney wrote a letter about the incident. A second event titled "Whose Narratives? What Free Speech for Palestine?" was scheduled for April 23, 2021, and was also blocked. The event had nine speakers scheduled, including Khaled, Whitehorn, and Sekou Odinga, an activist and former Black Panther.

In 2022, the new Downtown Campus opened on the fifth floor and a part of the 12th floor of 160 Spear St., replacing the Downtown Campus at 835 Market Street. The campus now only occupies the fifth floor.

In 2023, San Francisco State University launched an investigation into Maziar Behrooz, a history professor, after a student complained he had shown a depiction of Muhammad while teaching a class on the history of the Islamic world. The investigation was strongly criticized by the Foundation for Individual Rights and Expression (FIRE) as an "unacceptable — and unconstitutional" violation of academic freedom. The university continued its investigation despite FIRE's letter urging it to stop.

In Fall 2024, the Science & Engineering Innovation Center opened. The center includes a new 125,000 square-foot building and a renovated 54,000 square-foot building. West Grove Commons, a new freshmen dorm building, also opened in this semester.

In 2025, a closure of the Romberg Tiburon Campus was announced, but it was later paused after a fundraising campaign raised millions. It was announced in August 2026 that the campus would close by the end of September.

Also in 2026, Cesar Chavez's name was removed from the Student Center due to sexual misconduct allegations against the activist surfacing.

=== Demonstrations of the 2020s ===
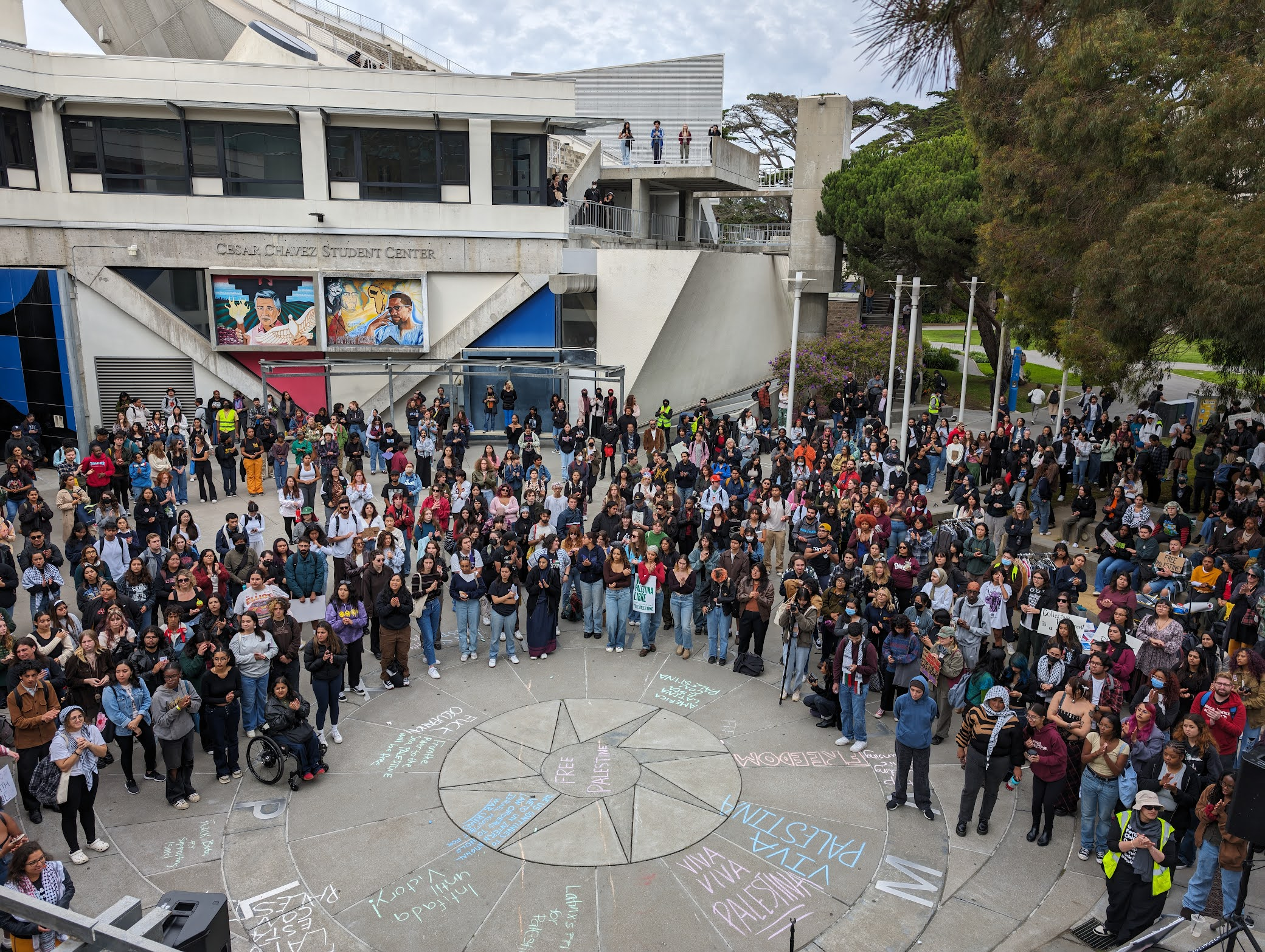
Hundreds of students walked out and rallied at San Francisco State's Malcolm X Plaza on October 25, 2023.

==== Budget and funding ====
===== 2023 =====
On September 11, about 300 students rallied and marched against the CSU system's proposed tuition increase. On September 15, CSU's Board of Trustees voted in favor of the plan to reduce the system's $1.5 billion deficit with annual tuition increases of 6%, starting from the 2024–2025 academic year to the 2028–2029 academic year.

After years of declining enrollment, budget cuts were announced on August 31, totaling $11 million. The university was also facing a $9 million budget deficit. A plan to eliminate the deficit calls for cutting the equivalent of 125 full-time positions. The California Faculty Association said it would result in the layoff of about 325 part-time lecturers.

On October 11, the CFA held a practice rally against the tuition increase and possible layoffs. On October 26, the CFA and the university's Young Democratic Socialists of America chapter led about 300 students and faculty in a rally and march against layoffs and the tuition increase. The CFA led another rally against layoffs on November 15.

On November 14, Teamsters Local 2010 held a one-day strike across all 23 CSU campuses, seeking higher pay. San Francisco State skilled laborers marched through the university before joining the picket line at the university's 19th and Holloway Avenues entrance.

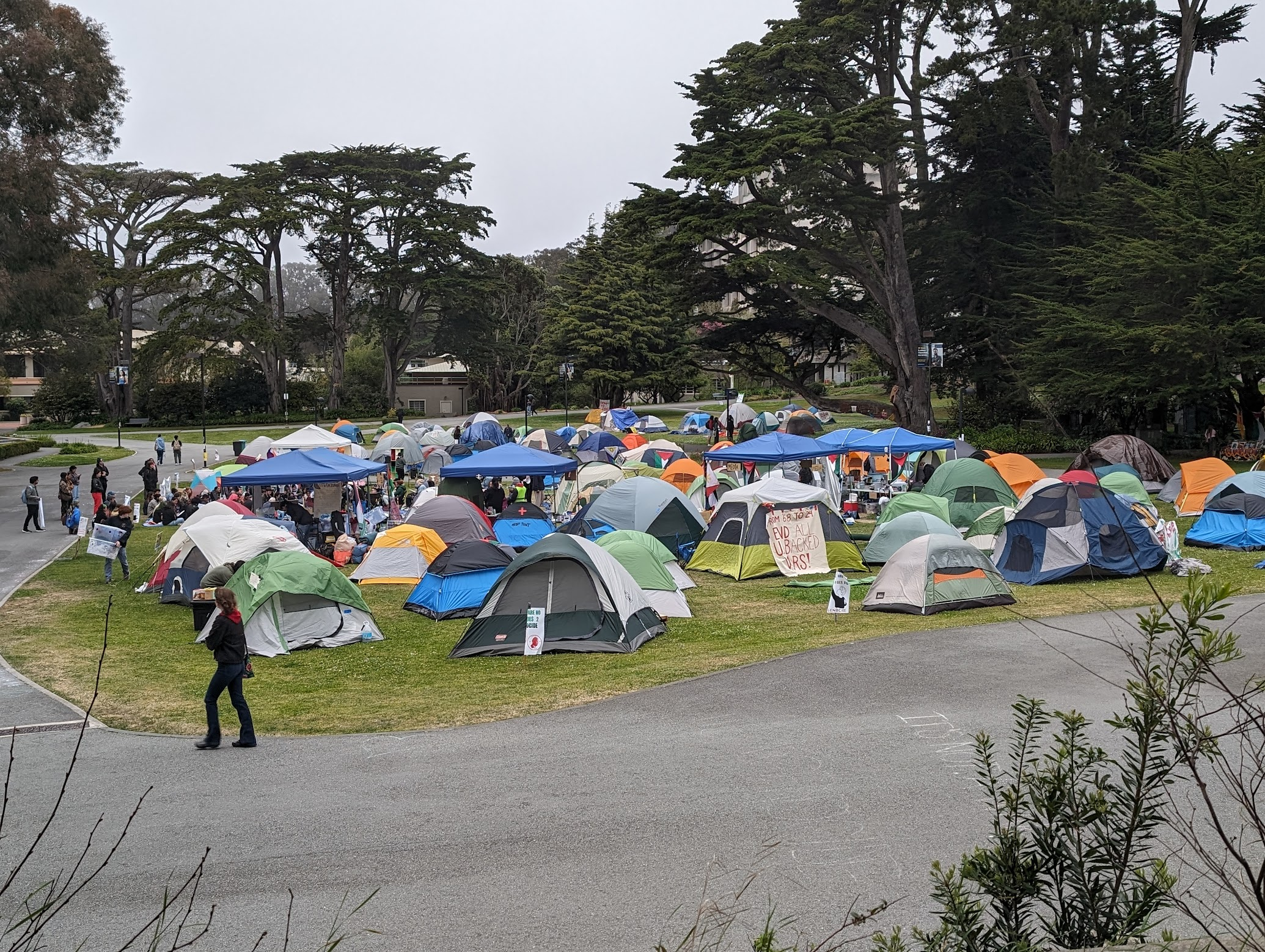
The encampment at SF State on May 3, 2024. It started on April 29.

Students walked out and protested on November 28, in response to 655 courses being cut and over 300 faculty members being laid off in the Spring 2024 semester.

One-day strikes led by the CFA were held across four CSU campuses from December 4–7, including San Francisco State on December 5. Faculty and students picketed against budget cuts and possible layoffs, also seeking a raise of 12%.

===== 2024 =====
SFSU faculty members participated in a strike led by the California Faculty Association across the CSU system on January 22, 2024. The strike was planned to last through the week before the university's spring semester, but ended early due to the CFA reaching a tentative agreement with the CSU.

On January 25, roughly 250 members and supporters of SFSU's CFA chapter rallied in protest of the tentative agreement and stood in the shape of the word "NO."

Over 200 students walked out on February 28 to protest annual 6% tuition increases for five years that would total to about 34%.

On December 11, about 150 people took part in a march styled as a jazz funeral to protest against lecturer faculty being laid off.

===== 2025 =====
In March and October, faculty wore red to protest against budget cuts. Dance students protested against budget cuts on September 5. On December 5, student workers protested for higher wages.

===== 2026 =====
Students protested for more funding with oversight, funding for rapid response efforts against ICE, and for dorm safety. They staged a walkout after unsuccessful negotiations. Also, university employees rallied in May and September for better pay.

==== Politics ====
===== 2023 =====
On April 6, 2023, former NCAA swimmer Riley Gaines visited SFSU for a Turning Point USA student chapter event and spoke publicly about her campaign against transgender athletes in women's sports, referring to it as spiritual warfare. Protesters attended the event and were peaceful. After the event concluded, more protesters arrived. Gaines was escorted by university police officers to shelter in a classroom. Video clips were posted to social media, including by Gaines, that appear to show protesters chanting, shouting, and holding signs. After the event, Gaines said she had been physically struck twice by a person during the protest. Soon after the event, the university police stated that no arrests were made and an investigation was ongoing. In 2024, the investigation was suspended due to a lack of evidence for Gaines' claims.

In response to the Gaza war, hundreds of students walked out and rallied on October 25, calling for a ceasefire. It was part of a nationwide walkout organized by Students for Justice in Palestine.

===== 2024 =====
April 29 marked the first day students held an encampment to protest against the Gaza war and call for the CSU system to divest from Israel. The encampment began after about 500 people attended a rally. This encampment began as part of a wave of protests in multiple countries. The encampment ended on May 15 after Students for Gaza, a student organization at SFSU, reached a divestment agreement with university leaders.

On November 12, approximately 40 people protested outside an event that hosted Chloe Cole.

===== 2025 =====
On February 18, students protested against deportations of undocumented immigrants under the Trump administration. Riley Gaines appeared for a second time on April 8, resulting in a small protest. On May 6, over 200 people protested outside a large event that featured Charlie Kirk and Riley Gaines again.

===== 2026 =====
On February 9, students walked out to protest against ICE.

== Milestones ==
- 1899 – Founded
- 1901 – First graduating class consisting of 36 women.
- 1923 – First Bachelor of Arts degree awarded
- 1930 – Became four-year school
- 1929 – Grace Hackett became the first known African-American to graduate from the school
- 1949 – Master's degree first offered
- 1972 – Received university status
- 1974 – Renamed San Francisco State University
- 1975 – Student Center opened its doors to students
- 1983 – Woo Chia-wei became the first Chinese-American to head a major American university
- 1999 – Celebrated 100th anniversary
- 2019 – Lynn Mahoney became the university's first female president in a permanent capacity

== Presidents ==
1. Frederic Lister Burk (1899–1924)
2. Archibald B. Anderson (1924–1927)
3. Mary A. Ward (1927)
4. Alexander C. Roberts (1927–1945)
5. J. Paul Leonard (1945–1957)
6. Glenn Dumke (1957–1961)
7. Frank L. Fenton (1961–1962)
8. Paul A. Dodd (1962–1965)
9. Stanley F. Paulson (1965–1966)
10. John Summerskill (1966–1968)
11. Robert R. Smith (1968)
12. S. I. Hayakawa (1968–1973)
13. Paul F. Romberg (1973–1983)
14. Chia-Wei Woo (1983–1988)
15. Robert A. Corrigan (1988–2012)
16. Leslie Wong (2012–2019)
17. Lynn Mahoney (2019–present)
