= Paul Leonard =

Paul Leonard may refer to:

- Paul Leonard (politician) (born 1943), American politician of the Ohio Democratic party
- Paul Leonard (writer), author of spin-off fiction based on Doctor Who
- J. Paul Leonard (1901–1995), American educator and university president

== See also ==
- Paul Leonard-Morgan (born 1974), Scottish composer
