= Elizabeth Wright =

Elizabeth Wright may refer to:

- Elizabeth Wright (artist) (born 1964), English artist
- Elizabeth Wright (educator) (1876–1963), founder of Connecticut College
- Elizabeth Wright (swimmer) (born 1979), Australian Paralympian
- Elizabeth Wright Hubbard (1896–1967), American physician and homeopath
- Elizabeth Wright (architect) (1922–2013), American architect; granddaughter of Frank Lloyd Wright
- Elizabeth Evelyn Wright (1872–1909), founded Denmark Industrial Institute
- Elizabeth Mary Wright (1863–1958), linguist and folklorist
- Elizabeth Oehlkers Wright (born 1966), American translator
- Elizabeth Washburn Wright (1874–1952), anti-opium campaigner in the United States
- Lizz Wright (Elizabeth LaCharla Wright, born 1980), American jazz singer
