= Connecticut College =

College in New London, Connecticut, US

- Latin: Collegium Connecticutense
- Former names: Thames College (1911); Connecticut College for Women (1911–1969)
- Motto: Tanquam lignum quod plantatum est secus decursus aquarum
- Motto in English: "Like a tree planted by rivers of water that bringeth forth its fruit in its season."
- Type: Private liberal arts college
- Established: April 1911; 115 years ago
- Academic affiliations: Oberlin Group; Annapolis Group; CLAC
- Endowment: $510.9 million (2025)
- President: Andrea Chapdelaine
- Academic staff: 281 (203 full-time, 81 part-time)
- Undergraduates: 1,990 (2024)
- Location: New London, Connecticut, United States; 41°22′42.36″N 72°06′16.81″W
- Campus: Suburban, 750 acres (303 ha)
- Colors: Connecticut College blue and white
- Sporting affiliations: NCAA Division III – NESCAC; NEISA; CWPA
- Mascot: Camel (Dromedary)
- Website: www.conncoll.edu
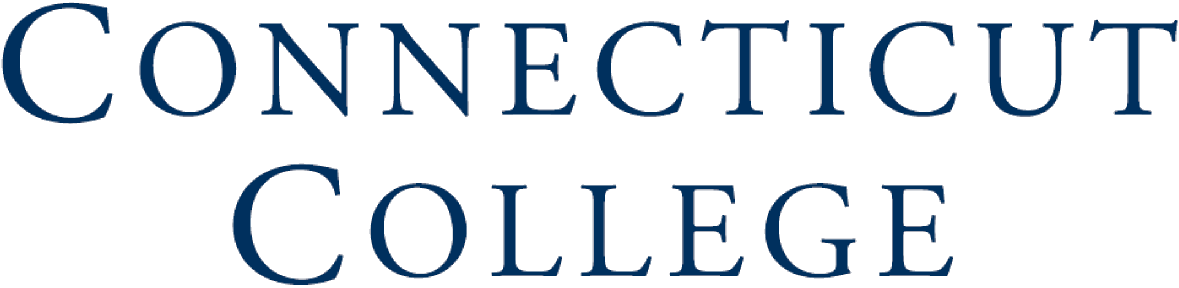

Connecticut College (Conn) is a private liberal arts college in New London, Connecticut, United States. Originally chartered as Thames College but soon changed to Connecticut College for Women, it was founded in 1911 as the state's only women's college, a response to Wesleyan University having closed its doors to female students in 1909. The college became coeducational in 1969, adopting its current name.

Conn is a four-year residential undergraduate institution with approximately 1,900 students. Students choose courses from 41 programs, including interdisciplinary pathways and centers, with a majority choosing to study abroad. The college is situated on a hill located adjacent to the Thames River. In 1982, Conn was inducted as a member of the New England Small College Athletic Conference (NESCAC), where its athletes compete as part of NCAA Division III.

== History ==
Connecticut College was chartered in 1911 as Connecticut's only women's college, having been established as a direct response to Wesleyan University's decision to stop admitting women. Elizabeth C. Wright and other Wesleyan alumnae convinced others to found this new college, espousing the increasing desire among women for higher education. To that end, the institution was initially chartered as Thames College, but a few months later the name was changed to the Connecticut College for Women. Their initial endowment came from financial assistance from the city of New London and its residents, along with a number of wealthy benefactors. The college sits on a former dairy farm owned by Charles P. Alexander of Waterford. He died in 1904 and his wife Harriet (Jerome) Alexander died in 1911. Their son Frank sold a large part of the land to the trustees to found Connecticut College.

The Hartford Daily Times ran an article on October 12, 1935, marking the college's 20th anniversary: "On September 27, 1915, the college opened its doors to students. The entering class was made up of 99 freshmen students, candidates for degrees, and 52 special students, a total registration of 151. A fine faculty of 23 members had been engaged and a library of 6,000 volumes had been gathered together." The college became co-educational in 1969, as President Charles E. Shain claimed that there was evidence that women were becoming uninterested in attending women's colleges. At that time, the school adopted its current name, Connecticut College.

In the spring of 2023, students, faculty, and staff began protesting against college president Katherine Bergeron, who had been president of the college for nearly a decade. A dean for equity and inclusion resigned after the college decided to hold fundraiser at the Everglades Club, a social club and venue that has longstanding accusations of discrimination against Black and Jewish people, but there had been longstanding criticism of Bergeron's "administrative overreach, micromanagement and lack of transparency". On March 24, 2023, after a vote of no confidence by the faculty in early March, Bergeron announced her resignation. On June 30, 2023, her last day in office, the board of trustees awarded her the title of President Emerita.

On July 1, 2023, Leslie Wong began work as interim president of the college. Andrea Chapdelaine, then-president of Hood College, was selected by the search committee to be the College's 12th president. Her term officially began on June 1, 2024. Chapdelaine was inaugurated on April 26, 2025.

== Campus ==
The vast majority of the university property is in New London. A piece is in Waterford.

The main campus has three residential areas. The North Campus contains the newest residential halls. The South Campus contains residence halls along the west side of Temple Green, across from several academic buildings. The oldest dorms on campus are Plant House and Blackstone House, which were founded in 1914. The campus houses the Winslow Ames House.

Connecticut College's two principal libraries are the Charles E. Shain Library and the Greer Music Library, which is located in the Cummings Arts Center. The Shain Library houses a collection of more than 500,000 books and periodicals and an extensive collection of electronic resources. It is also home to The Linda Lear Center for Special Collections and Archives, and to the Charles Chu Asian Art Reading Room. The Lear Center has more than fifty book, manuscript, and art collections including research archives devoted to Rachel Carson, Eugene O'Neill, and Beatrix Potter. The Charles Chu Asian Art Reading Room serves both as a quiet reading area and as the permanent exhibition space for the Chu-Griffis Art Collection.

The student center is "The College Center at Crozier-Williams" (often shortened to "Cro"), and is located in the middle of the campus. The student center houses the Connecticut College bookstore (which doubles as a small convenience store), the campus post office, the Oasis Snack Shop, and the campus bar, Humphrey's (formerly The Cro Bar). There are also student services offices as well as faculty offices and performance spaces for the Dance department.

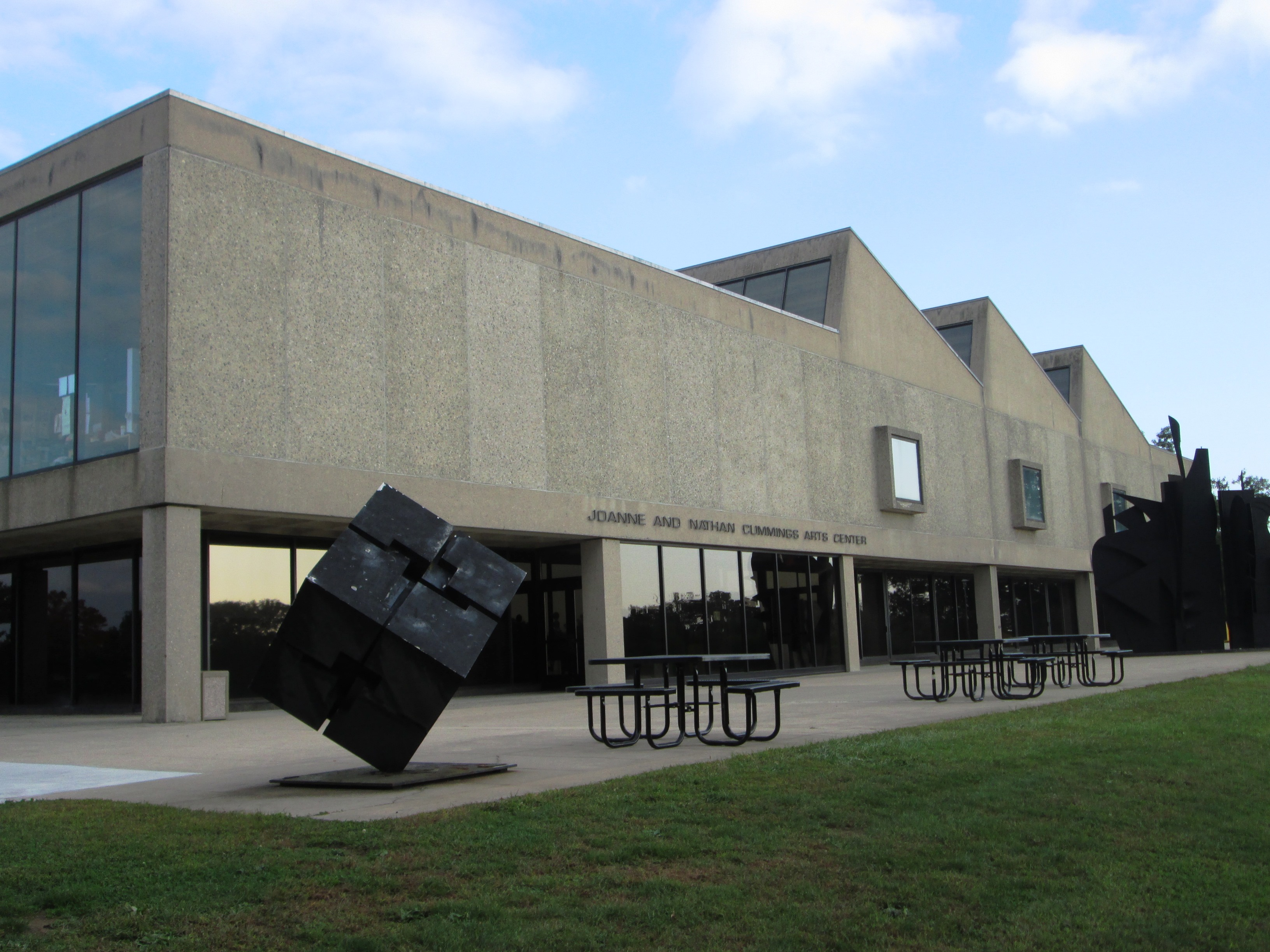
Cummings Art Center

The Charles E. Shain Library was originally dedicated in 1976 and is named after former College President Charles Shain. It was renovated, expanded, and re-dedicated in 2015. The renovation was honored by the American Institute of Architects with a 2015 New England Honor Award in the category of Preservation. In 2016, LibraryJournal named the library a New Landmark Libraries Winner.

Performance spaces on campus include: Palmer Auditorium, Tansill Theater, housed in Hillyer Hall; Myers Dance Studio, housed in Crozier-Williams College Center; Harkness Chapel; and Evans Music Hall, Fortune Recital Hall, and Oliva Hall, all located in Cummings Art Center.

Palmer Auditorium was home to the American Dance Festival from 1947 to 1977, featuring choreographers such as Martha Graham, José Limón, and Merce Cunningham in what was called "the most important summertime event in modern dance."

The campus makes up part of the Connecticut College Arboretum. This arboretum and botanical garden is free and open to the public year-round.

Harkness Chapel was designed by architect James Gamble Rogers, exhibiting his Colonial Georgian style, with twelve stained glass windows by G. Owen Bonawit. The building is used for denominational religious services, as well as for ceremonies, concerts and recitals, weddings, and other public functions.

The Lyman Allyn Art Museum is also located on campus, and while some classes are taught there, it is not part of the College itself. The museum's website states that "the permanent collection includes over 10,000 paintings, sculpture, drawings, prints, furniture, and decorative arts, with an emphasis on American art from the 18th through 20th centuries." The collection is housed in a neo-classical building designed by Charles A. Platt.

== Academics ==
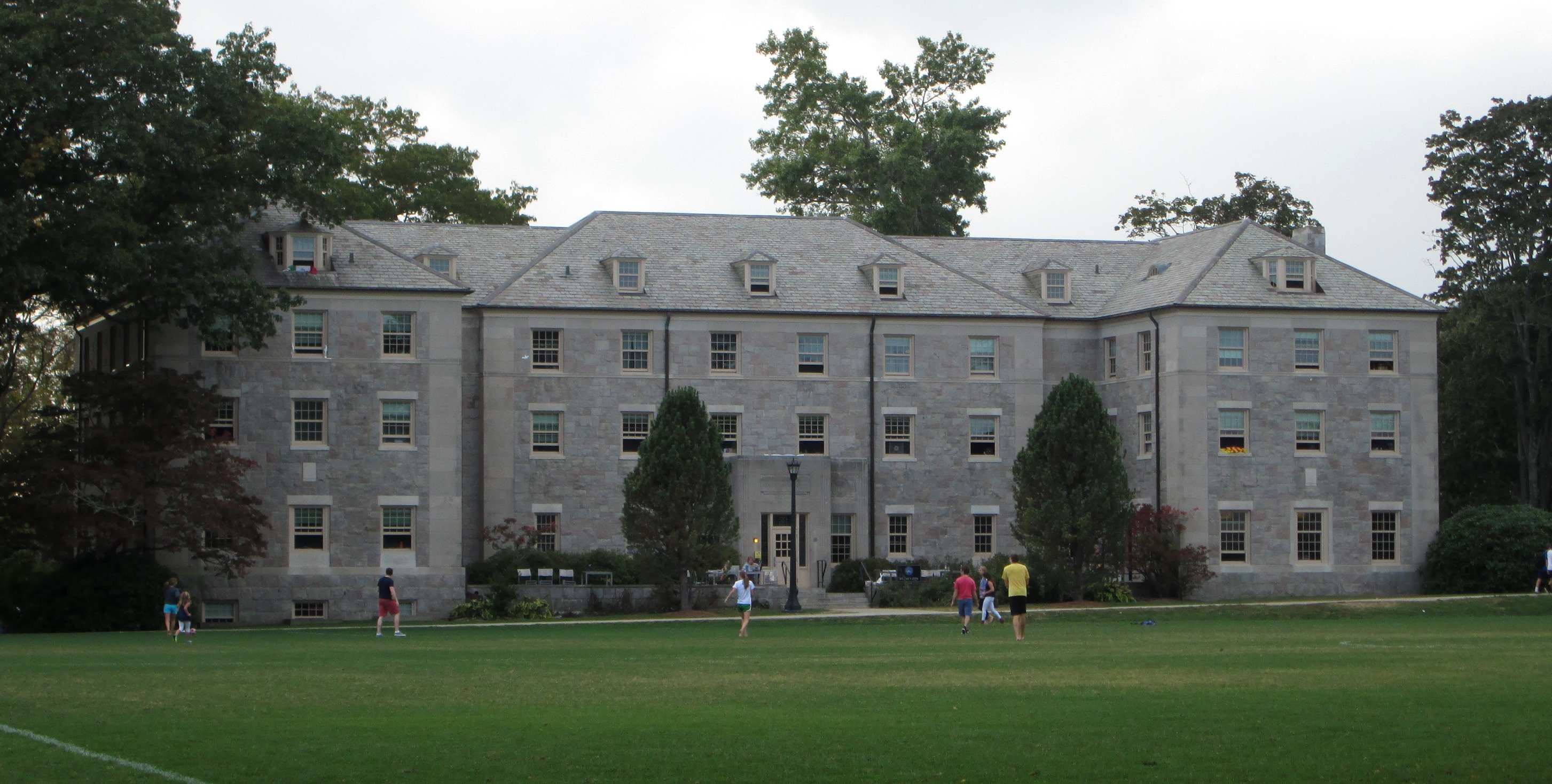
Harkness House

Connecticut College is accredited by the New England Commission of Higher Education; it has been so continuously by NECHE or its predecessor since December 1932. The college's academics are organized into thirty-one academic departments and seven interdisciplinary programs with forty-one traditional majors plus opportunities for self-designed courses of study. Starting with the class of 2020, students at Connecticut College participate in a new interdisciplinary general education curriculum called Connections.

Its most popular majors, by 2024 graduates, were: Psychology (55), Economics (44), Computer Science (32), Government (29), and Biological Sciences (26).

Connecticut College has a history of undergraduate research work and students are encouraged to make conference presentations and publish their work under the guidance of a professor. The college had 187 full-time faculty members in 2024-25; 96% held a doctorate or other terminal degree. The student-faculty ratio is about 9.4 to 1.

=== Admissions ===
Admission to the college is considered "more selective" by U.S. News & World Report. The college received 7,950 applications for the Class of 2028 of which 2,945 (36%) were accepted. Of the students in the entering class who submitted SAT scores, the middle 50% range was 690-755 for evidence-based reading and writing, and 660-740 for Math.

=== Rankings ===
Academic rankings

Liberal arts
- U.S. News & World Report: 55
- Washington Monthly: 25

National
- Forbes: 162
- WSJ/College Pulse: 103

In the 2025 college rankings of U.S. News & World Report, Connecticut College ranked 55th (tie) among national liberal arts colleges, 35th (tie) for "Best Undergraduate Teaching", 38th (tie) for "Most Innovative", 82nd for "Best Value", and 88th (tie) for "Top Performers in Social Mobility".

Washington Monthly ranked Connecticut College 48th in 2024 among 194 liberal arts colleges in the US based on its contribution to the public good, as measured by social mobility, research, and promoting public service. Forbes ranked Connecticut College 162th overall in its 2023 list of 650 liberal arts colleges, universities and service academies; 45th among liberal arts schools, 65th in the Northeast, and 90th among private colleges. Connecticut College is accredited by the New England Commission of Higher Education.

== Student life ==
=== Honor code ===
Students live under the college's student-adjudicated honor code which was introduced in 1922. Manifestations of the code include self-scheduled, non-proctored final exams.

=== Demographics ===
In a typical year, the college enrolls just under 2000 students from 40 to 45 states, Washington, D.C., and 70 countries. Approximately forty percent of students are men. The fall 2024 student body was 68% White, 12% Hispanic, 3% Asian American, 5% African American, and 4% multiracial, with an additional 6% international students.

=== Memberships ===
Connecticut College is a member of Phi Beta Kappa, the Annapolis Group, and the New England Small College Athletic Conference (NESCAC).

=== Clubs and organizations ===
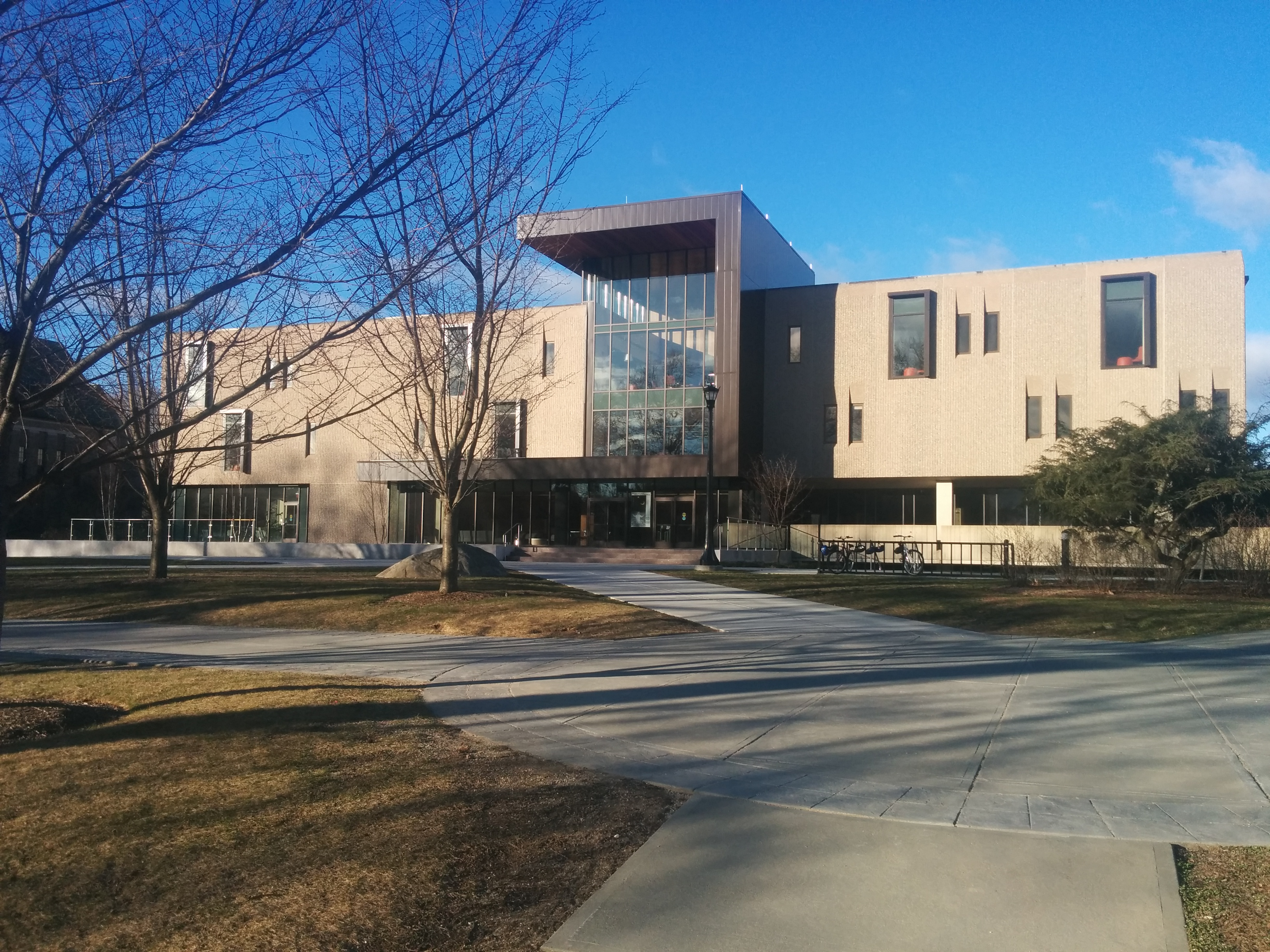
Charles E. Shain Library

Connecticut College includes many extracurricular clubs and associations, but it does not offer a Greek system of fraternities or sororities. Some current clubs and organizations include African Student Association, Alpine Ski Team, Amaltheia Ultimate Disc Club, Asian Student in Action, Black Student Union, Books and Banter, Cadenza Literary Magazine, Camel Studios, CC Civic Forum, Club Tennis, Club Volleyball, Conn Christian Fellowship, Dance Club, Debate Union, Deimos Ultimate Disc Club, Disability Affinity Club, Entrepreneurship Club, Equity in STEM, Figure Skating Club, Film Club, Gaming Club, Gray Area Magazine, Her Campus, Hillel, Las Voces Unidas, Men's Club Hockey, Mock Trial, Model United Nations, Movimiento Estudiantil Chicanx de Aztlan, Musicians Organized for Band Rights on Campus, Muslim Students Association, National Alliance on Mental Illness, N2O Improv Comedy, Outdoor Adventures, People of Color Alliance, Pre-Health Club, SCUDS Improv, Student Refugee Alliance, Wig and Candle, Women's Club Ice Hockey, Women's Club Soccer, Women's Weightlifting, Women's/Nonbinary Rugby Club. The college has seven a cappella groups. Treble or high voice groups are The Shwiffs (founded in 1944), The ConnChords (founded in 1946), and MissConnduct (founded in 2010). The mixed groups with singers of all voice parts include the Vox Cameli (founded 1999), ConnArtists (founded 1995), and the Williams Street Mix (founded in 1991). The Co Co Beaux (founded in 1978) is the only all low voice group.

Composer and violinist Margaret Jones Wiles founded and conducted the Connecticut College Orchestra when she taught at the college during the 1950s.

The college radio station (WCNI 90.9 FM) broadcasts a variety of music, including polka, blues, and Celtic music shows. A 2,000 watt transmitter installed in 2003 reaches much of the lower New England region. Connecticut College has two student newspapers in which students handle all aspects of production: reporting, editing, ad sales, management, photography, layout, multimedia, and design. The College Voice is an editorially independent print and online bi-weekly publication, and The Conntrarian is an online opinion publication and a member of the Collegiate Network.

The Student Activities Council (SAC) runs events including club fairs, school dances, concerts, and off-campus excursions. SAC is also responsible for Floralia, the annual spring concert. Recent Floralia artists have included Waka Flaka Flame, Daya, Misterwives, Cash Cash, RAC, and St. Lucia.

Unity House is the college's multicultural center which promotes, supports, educates, and implements multicultural awareness programs on campus. It supports various affinity, activist, and performance student groups. The Feminist Resource, Education, & Empowerment (F.R.E.E) Center (formerly the Women's Center) provides a space for programming and events concerning gender issues. The LGBTQIA Resource Center serves queer students and their allies by providing a supportive space, resource library, social events, and educational programming. It also hosts several student organizations. In August 2013, Campus Pride named Connecticut College one of the top 25 LGBT-friendly colleges and universities.

== Athletics ==
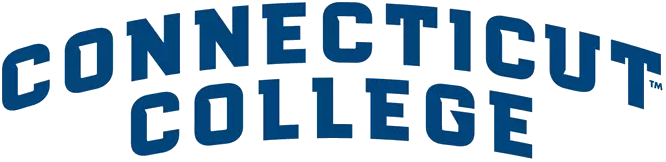
Connecticut athletics wordmark

The College's teams participate as a member of the National Collegiate Athletic Association's Division III in the New England Small College Athletic Conference (NESCAC). There are a total of 28 varsity athletics teams at Conn. The twelve men's sports include basketball, cross country, ice hockey, lacrosse, rowing, soccer, squash, swimming and diving, tennis, track and field, and water polo. The fifteen women's sports consist of basketball, cross country, field hockey, ice hockey, lacrosse, rowing, sailing, soccer, squash, swimming and diving, tennis, track and field, volleyball, and water polo.

In 2014, the women's soccer team won the College's first NESCAC Championship, defeating Williams College in penalty kicks. The team advanced to the NCAA Division III Tournament, but lost in the second round to Montclair State University in extra time.

On December 4, 2021, the men's soccer team won the College's first-ever NCAA Division III National Championship by defeating Amherst College in penalty kicks. Earlier in the season, the team won its first NESCAC regular season title.

On January 21, 2021, Connecticut College goalkeeper AJ Marcucci was selected 67th overall in the 2021 MLS SuperDraft by New York Red Bulls. He became the first-ever draft pick from Connecticut College and was the first Division III pick since 2016.

The Connecticut College Women's Water Polo Team has won four Collegiate Water Polo Association Division III championships.

Connecticut College has produced 427 collegiate All-Americans, sixty Academic All-Americans and twelve Olympic qualifiers.

The Connecticut College Athletics Hall of Fame was established in 1989 and currently has over 100 inductees.

== Notable alumni ==
Connecticut College graduates of note include Bloomberg Businessweek senior national correspondent Joshua Green, AOL CEO Tim Armstrong, New York Times best-selling authors Sloane Crosley, Hannah Tinti and David Grann, Academy Award-winning actress Estelle Parsons, fashion designer Peter Som, National Baseball Hall of Fame director Jeff Idelson, philanthropist Nan Kempner, Beyond Meat founder Ethan Brown, Senior Federal District Judge Kimba Wood and American Olympic rower Anita DeFrantz.

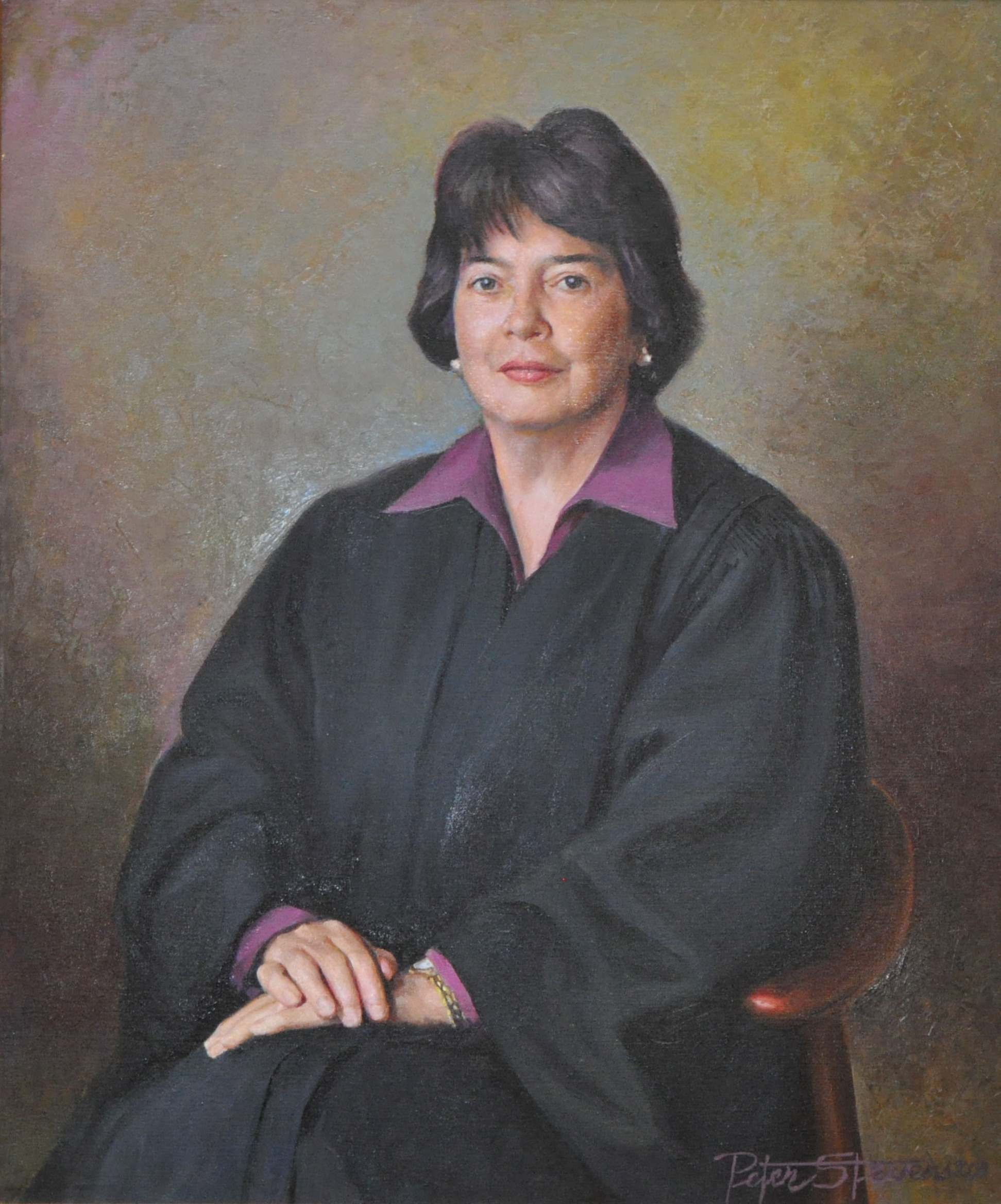
Patricia Wald,
Chief Judge of the U.S. Court of Appeals for the D.C. Circuit

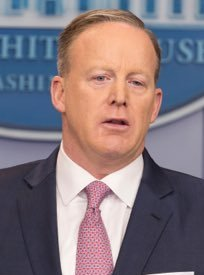
Sean Spicer,
30th White House Press Secretary

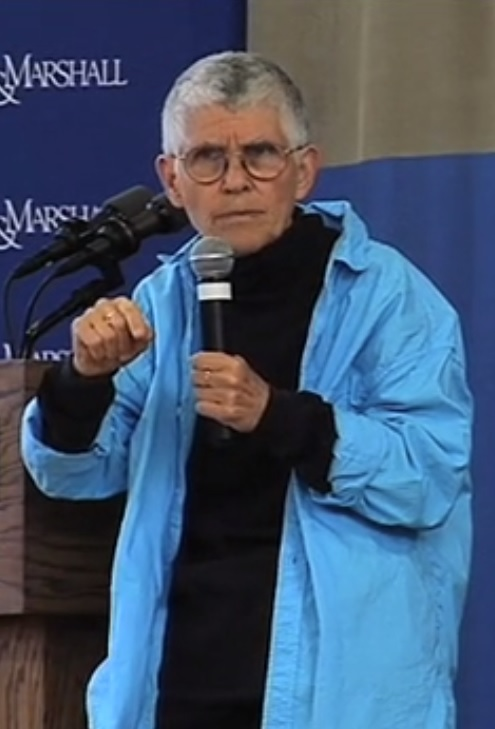
Cynthia Enloe,
Political theorist and feminist writer

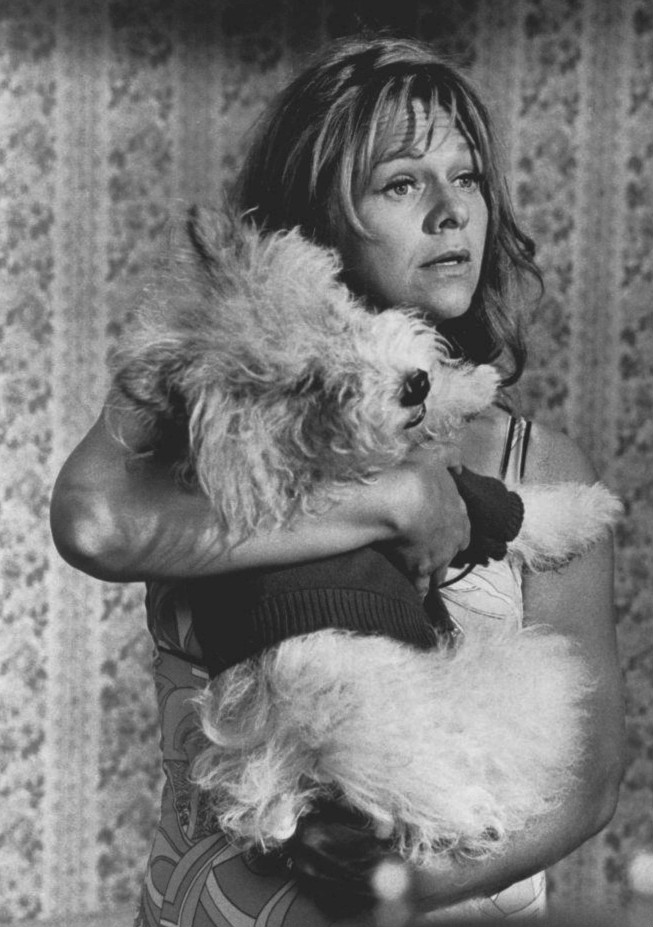
Estelle Parsons,
Starring actress of Bonnie and Clyde and Rachel, Rachel

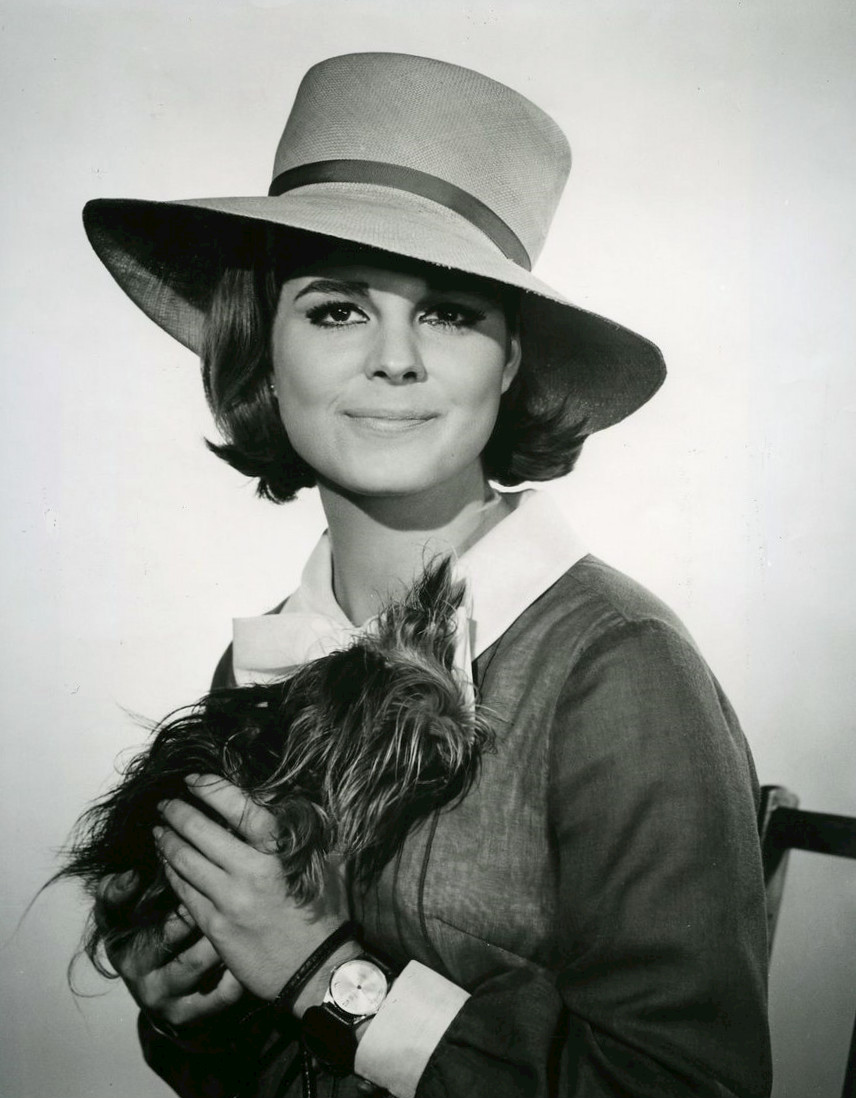
Susan Saint James,
Actress, activist, and star of Kate & Allie

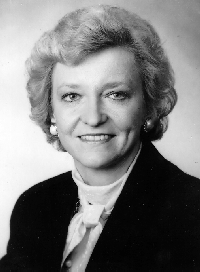
Dorcas Hardy,
10th Commissioner of the Social Security Administration

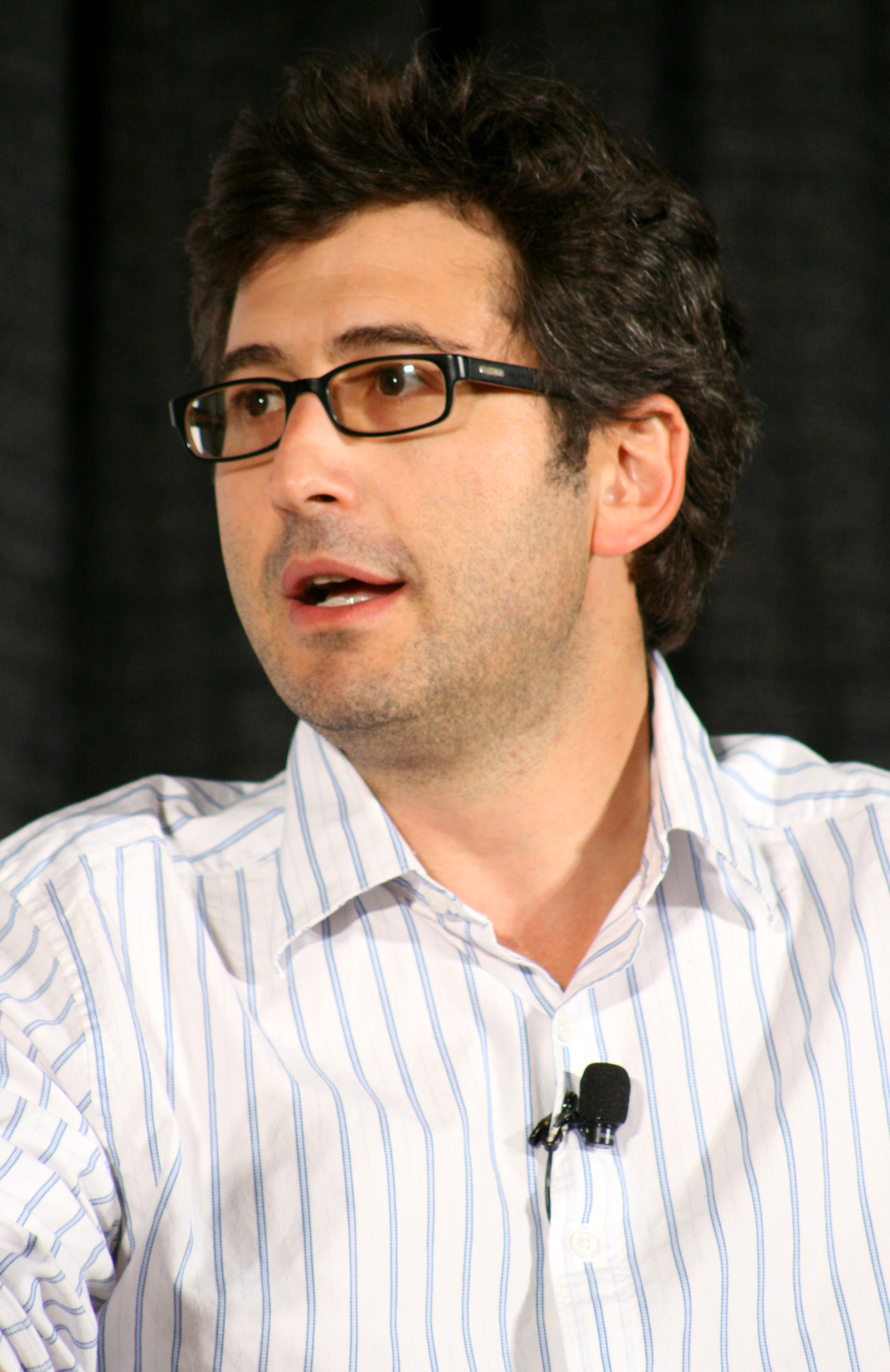
Sam Seder,
Political commentator and host of The Majority Report
