= Charles E. Shain =

American professor and college president

Charles E. Shain was an American professor and college president. He served as sixth president of Connecticut College from 1962 to 1974, and prior that, as a professor of English at Carleton College and chief administrator of their American Studies Program.

== Early life and education ==
Shain was raised in Pennsylvania. He earned his bachelor's degree, masters, and doctorate degrees at Princeton University, in English, where he was also elected to Phi Beta Kappa and awarded a Woodrow Wilson Scholarship. As a Mathey Fellow at Princeton, he studied at Cambridge University, and at the University of London under a Fulbright Grant.

== Career ==
Shain began teaching English at the Los Alamos Ranch School, and later at the Milton Academy. After chairing the English Department at Carleton College and teaching English and American Studies from 1949 until 1962, he was appointed as president of Connecticut College. During his 12 year presidency, Shain oversaw several progressive changes to the College's structure, such as encouraging admission of students of color and recruiting faculty and staff of color, leading the college through several major strikes and demonstrations against the Vietnam War, and in 1969, he facilitated the admission of men and the transition of the College to coeducation. As a college president, Shain served in a variety of offices, such as president of the Connecticut Conference of Independent Colleges.

Shain retired in 1974 from Connecticut College. In 1985, the College renamed the new campus library as the Charles E. Shain Library.

== Personal life ==
In the second World War, Shain served in the Army Air Force in the Pacific, where he became a major and was awarded a Bronze Star.

Shain was married first to Josephine Hooker Wilson, and, after her death, married Samuella R. Etnier.
