= Andrea Chapdelaine =

American academic administrator

- Chapdelaine in 2016

12th President of Connecticut College
- Incumbent
- Assumed office June 1, 2024
- Preceded by: Leslie Wong (interim)

11th President of Hood College
- In office July 1, 2015 – June 1, 2024
- Preceded by: Ronald Volpe
- Succeeded by: Debbie Ricker (interim)

Personal details
- Education: University of New Hampshire (BA); University of Connecticut (MA, PhD)

Andrea E. Chapdelaine is an American academic administrator and social psychologist serving as the 12th President of Connecticut College. She was formerly the 11th president of Hood College 2015 to 2024.

== Life ==
Chapdelaine is from Chicopee, Massachusetts. A first-generation college student, she earned a bachelor's degree in psychology with a minor in justice studies from the University of New Hampshire. She completed a master's degree in social psychology and Ph.D. in psychology at the University of Connecticut.

Chapdelaine worked at Wabash College from 1993 to 1995. From 1995 to 1998, she taught at Trinity College. In 1998, Chapdelaine joined Albright College as a psychology professor. She was Provost and Vice President of Academic Affairs from 2006 to 2015. In July 2015, she became the eleventh president of Hood College. She stepped down on June 30, 2024. On July 1, 2024, she became the twelfth president of Connecticut College, succeeding interim president Leslie Wong.
