= Charles Chu =

Chinese-American painter and educator

Charles Chi-Jung Chu
- 朱继荣
- Born: October 8, 1918; Hebei Province, China
- Died: October 30, 2008 (aged 90); New London, Connecticut
- Education: Chongqing University University of California, Berkeley Harvard University
- Occupations: Painter, professor, calligrapher
- Style: Landscapes, mogu, shan shui
- Spouse: Bettie Cole
- Children: 4
- Website: https://www.littlefrog.com/home

Charles Chi-Jung Chu (October 8, 1918 – October 30, 2008) was a Chinese-American painter, calligrapher, scholar, and professor emeritus at Connecticut College. He founded the Chinese language program at Connecticut College and was known for his contributions to Asian art and his landscape watercolors.

== Early life ==
Charles Chu was born in 1918 in a small farming village in Hebei Province, China. His early life in China was characterized by his love for art and nature, which later influenced his artistic work. He attended high school in Beijing and went on to study at the National Central University in Chongqing.

After serving in the Chinese army during World War II, Chu emigrated to the United States in 1945. He pursued graduate studies in political science, first at the University of California, Berkeley, and later at Harvard University, with plans to return to China and contribute to its post-war reconstruction. However, when the Chinese Communist Party assumed control of China in 1949, Chu realized that his Western political science training would put a target on his back, and he chose to remain in the United States.

== Academic career ==
Chu began his teaching career at Yale University, where he worked for 15 years before moving to Connecticut College in 1965. At Connecticut College, he founded and directed the Chinese language program. He taught Chinese language, literature, and the history of Chinese painting until his retirement in 1984. Chu maintained close relationships with his students throughout his career and his home near the campus was often open to students.

== Artistic work ==
Chu was an accomplished painter and calligrapher, and his work gained prominence both during and after his teaching career. He specialized in traditional Chinese landscape painting, often focusing on serene, natural scenes, or on depictions of animals. After retiring from teaching, Chu devoted more time to his art, holding several exhibitions of his work.

He played a significant role in curating and growing the Chu-Griffis Art Collection, an extensive collection of literati-style paintings established in his honor by his close friend Toby Griffis. The collection, which includes numerous pieces of contemporary and traditional Asian art, is housed at Connecticut College in the Charles E. Shain Library.

== Legacy ==
In recognition of Chu's contributions to art and education, the Charles Chu Asian Art Reading Room was established at Connecticut College in 2001. Funded by a donation from John and Heidi Niblack, along with a gift from Agnes Gund and Daniel Shapiro, the reading room serves as both a quiet study area and a permanent exhibition space for Asian art. Designed by Schwartz/Silver Architects, the room is characterized by simplicity, tranquility, and a deep connection to traditional Asian aesthetics, reflecting Chu's own artistic philosophy. It regularly hosts exhibitions, including works from the Chu-Griffis Collection.

== Personal life ==
Chu married Bettie Cole, and together they raised four children. Charles and Bettie lived in New London, Connecticut, for 40 years. Chu was sometimes referred to by his childhood nickname "Little Frog."

Charles Chu died at his home on October 30, 2008. A special memorial exhibition, Remembering Charles Chu: A Special Exhibition of Love and Friendship, was held in the Charles Chu Reading Room in 2009.
