= Debbie Ricker =

American reproductive biologist and academic administrator (born 1965)

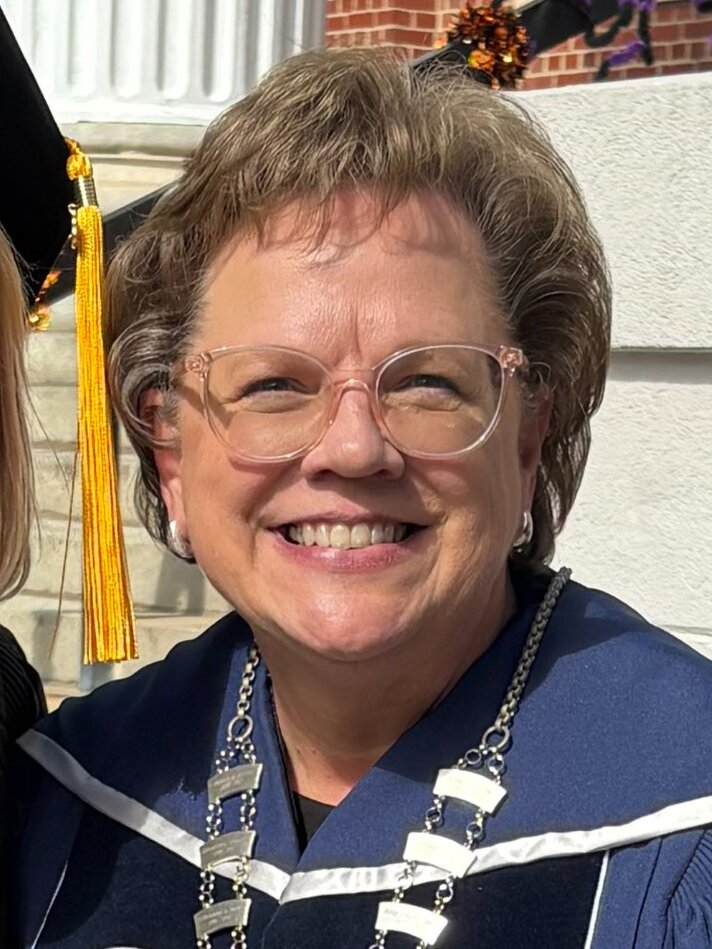
- Ricker in 2025

President of Hood College
- Incumbent
- Assumed office October 18, 2025 (Interim from July 1, 2024)
- Preceded by: Andrea Chapdelaine

Personal details
- Born: Deborah Dianne Ricker; October 1, 1965 (age 60) Asheville, North Carolina, U.S.
- Education: Mars Hill College; East Tennessee State University; Johns Hopkins University

Deborah Dianne Ricker (born October 1, 1965) is an American reproductive biologist and academic administrator serving as the president of Hood College since 2024. Her research has focused on reproductive biology, particularly studying sperm motility, fertilization processes, and the role of nitric oxide synthase in male reproductive systems.

== Early life and education ==
Ricker was born on October 1, 1965, in Asheville, North Carolina. She pursued an undergraduate degree in biology at Mars Hill College, graduating cum laude with a B.S. in 1987. Ricker then earned a M.S. in biological science from East Tennessee State University in 1989. During her graduate schooling, she served as a graduate teaching assistant and laboratory technician in the department of obstetrics and gynecology at East Tennessee State University James H. Quillen College of Medicine from 1987 to 1989. Early in her research, she studied reproductive biology topics, including the effects of platelet-activating factors on sperm motility and fertilization processes across various species. Her research on reproductive biology and sperm physiology was further shaped by mentors such as Donald S. Coffey.

Ricker continued her studies at Johns Hopkins School of Hygiene and Public Health, completing her Ph.D. in reproductive biology in 1995. During her doctoral studies, Ricker's primary advisor was Thomas S. K. Chang, who encouraged her development as a scientist and educator and offered her guidance in balancing academic and personal pursuits. Ricker began her doctoral research under an National Institutes of Health (NIH) training grant. Her work there included studies on epididymal protein changes following sympathetic denervation and the role of nitric oxide synthase in male reproductive systems. She collaborated with colleagues Barry and Barbara Zirkin, Arthur Burnett, and Evelyn Barrack, who contributed to her training and research in the division of reproductive biology and the department of urology.

Ricker completed training at the Institute for Educational Management at the Harvard Graduate School of Education.

== Career ==
Ricker's academic career began at York College of Pennsylvania, where she joined as an assistant professor in the biological sciences in 1995. She advanced through academic ranks to associate professor with tenure and later to professor of biological science. Her early research focused on reproductive biology, specifically the autonomic innervation of the male reproductive tract and its effects on fertility, with her work published in journals such as Journal of Andrology, Biology of Reproduction, and Fertility and Sterility. She received several research grants from the Pennsylvania Academy of Science to support her studies and undergraduate research initiatives.

At York College, Ricker held administrative roles, including chair of the department of biological sciences from 2002 to 2008. She expanded the biology curriculum and developed a new ecological sciences center, promoting undergraduate research through events like Student Scholars Week. Ricker authored strategic plans and led initiatives for a new general education curriculum, "Generation Next," implemented in 2015. In 2010, Ricker became dean of academic services at York College, overseeing academic advising, career services, study abroad, and experiential learning programs. In this role, she developed first-year and at-risk student support programs, including the summer academic enrichment program, "Bridge to Results." Her retention-focused initiatives helped improve first-year student retention rates. Her research on reproductive biology, combined with her administrative experience, guided her work in supporting academic quality and program structure at York College.

In July 2016, Ricker joined Hood College as provost and vice president of academic affairs, where she managed the college's 17 academic departments and partnered with faculty on initiatives related to student success, institutional research, and community engagement. Her work at Hood College includes developing new programs in public health, cybersecurity, and finance and advancing student success and experiential learning initiatives. In 2019, she was one of four finalist to be provost of Elon University. In July 2024, Ricker was appointed interim president of Hood College following the departure of Hood's previous president, Andrea Chapdelaine. She began this role on July 1, 2024, overseeing the institution's strategic goals during the leadership transition. Ricker was inaugurated as Hood College's 12th president in October 2025.

== Personal life ==
Ricker resides in Jefferson, Maryland, with her partner, Christopher, and their 3 dogs. She enjoys quilting.
