= W. Ann Reynolds =

American academic administrator (born 1938)

President of the University of Alabama at Birmingham
- In office 1997–2002
- Preceded by: Paul Hardin
- Succeeded by: Carol Garrison

Chancellor of the City University of New York
- In office 1990–1997

3rd Chancellor of California State University
- In office 1982–1990
- Preceded by: Glenn Dumke
- Succeeded by: Ellis E. McCune

Provost of the Ohio State University
- In office 1979–1982

Personal details
- Born: Wynetka Ann King; 1938 (age 87–88) Coffeyville, Kansas, U.S.
- Parent: John E. King (father)
- Education: Emporia State University (BS); University of Iowa (MA, PhD)
- Profession: Zoologist, university administrator

Wynetka Ann Reynolds (born 1938) is an American zoologist and university administrator who has served as provost of the Ohio State University (1979–1982), chancellor of the California State University (CSU) system (1982–1990), chancellor of the City University of New York (CUNY) (1990–1997), and president of the University of Alabama at Birmingham (1997–2002). She is the only person to have headed two (CSU and CUNY) of the three largest systems of higher education in the United States. The universities she has led account for 6 of the top 10 U.S. schools in upward mobility for their students.

== Early life and education ==
Wynetka Ann King was born in 1938 in Coffeyville, Kansas. Her father, John E. King, was a Presbyterian missionary, and she spent her early years on Indian reservations in Oklahoma and Arizona. She earned a B.S. degree at Emporia State University in 1958, and M.A. (1960) and Ph.D. (1962) degrees in zoology from the University of Iowa.

== Academic career ==
Reynolds began teaching in the College of Medicine at the University of Illinois in 1965, where she also conducted research on embryonic and fetal development, child nutrition, and pancreatic disease. She was named Dean of the Graduate College at the University of Illinois Medical Center in 1972 and served until 1979. She was named provost at Ohio State University in 1979 and stayed for three years.

=== California State University (1982–1990) ===
In 1982 Reynolds was designated chancellor of the California State University system, replacing Glenn S. Dumke, who had held the job for twenty years, most of the life of the CSU system. During the late 1980s when the CSU system was contemplating a facility in the northern part of San Diego County, she was insistent that it be a full fledged university, California State University San Marcos (CSUSM), rather than a satellite campus of San Diego State University. It was the nation's first new state university in more than 20 years.

Although her term was generally successful, she was forced to resign in 1990 when the system trustees questioned the substantial pay raises she had given herself, other top executives, and campus presidents. In addition, several trustees were displeased with a rule that she had put in place shortly before being forced to resign that required campus presidents who were 65 years of age or older to retire. Among those campus presidents forced to retire before this rule was rescinded were Jewel Plummer Cobb at California State University, Fullerton and Ellis E. McCune at Cal State Hayward (now California State University, East Bay). Ironically, the CSU Board of Trustees appointed McCune interim Chancellor while a search for Reynold's replacement was conducted.

=== City University of New York (1990–1997) ===
When Reynolds became the chancellor of the City University of New York (CUNY) in 1990, the system's open enrollment policy had been the subject of debate for two decades. Reynolds defended open enrollment, and also worked to develop stronger college preparatory courses before students entered CUNY – which resulted in applicants with stronger academic records. Reynold's effort to introduce academic coordination among campuses and reduce duplicated programs was less successful, and provoked resistance from faculty and administrators. She angered mayor Rudolph W. Giuliani by attempting to relieve students on welfare from workfare requirements. She removed Leonard Jeffries as chairman of the black studies department at City College after he made anti-Semitic comments.

In 1994 critics charged she spent too much time serving on the boards of five companies; Reynolds replied corporate contacts strengthened CUNY. According to The New York Times, when she left CUNY in 1997, she had a reputation as a "hard-charging, sometimes tyrannical administrator who can be utterly charming but also short-tempered and brusque."

=== University of Alabama at Birmingham (1997–2003) ===
In 1997 Reynolds was named president of the University of Alabama at Birmingham, where she established successful capital campaigns and new programs in arts, math and science to develop local teens into college-bound students. She continued to serve on several corporate boards, resulting in frequent absences from the university, a practice different from her predecessors and successors.

In 2003, Reynolds claimed she was forced out of the presidency because of gender and age, and filed a federal discrimination complaint. She charged that system chancellor Thomas C. Meredith treated her "in a demeaning and sexist manner," including having her stand in line in the rain to buy theater tickets for him, restricting her contact with board members, and after firing her in 2002, offering her a retirement package less than those offered to other outgoing presidents. She accepted a one-year position as director of the university's Center for Community Outreach and Development from 2002 to 2003.

== Books by W. Ann Reynolds ==
- with Gary Parker and Rex Reynolds, DNA: The Key to Life (1966; Longman, 1975)
- with Gary Parker, Mitosis and Meiosis (1966; Dearborn Trade Publishing, 1979)
- Beauty in the Bureaucracy, the David Dodds Henry lecture (Springfield: University of Illinois, 1998), 30 pp.

Academic offices
Preceded by Glenn S. Dumke	3rd Chancellor of the California State University System; 1982–1990	Succeeded by Barry Munitz
