= Glenn Dumke =

American academic administrator and historian (1917-1989)

Glenn S. Dumke
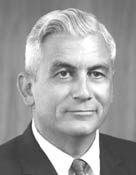

2nd Chancellor of California State University
- In office 1962–1982

6th President of San Francisco State University
- In office 1957–1961
- Preceded by: J. Paul Leonard
- Succeeded by: Frank L. Fenton

Personal details
- Born: Glenn Schroeder Dumke; May 5, 1917 Green Bay, Wisconsin, U.S.
- Died: June 30, 1989 (aged 72) Encino, California, U.S.
- Spouse: Dorothy Robinson Dumke
- Education: Occidental College; University of California, Los Angeles
- Occupation: Administrator, professor, chancellor, university president, historian

Glenn Schroeder Dumke (May 5, 1917 – June 30, 1989; pseudonyms Glenn Pierce and Jordan Allen) was an American historian, educator, university president, and chancellor of the California State University system. Dumke was the 6th President of San Francisco State University (SFSU; formerly San Francisco State College), serving from 1957 to 1961. He served as the second chancellor of the California State University system from 1962 to 1982, for most of its first twenty years. He developed common standards for the colleges and universities in the system, supported affirmative action to recruit women and minority students, and assisted the establishment of four new campuses.

== Early life and education ==
Glenn Dumke was born in 1917 in Green Bay, Wisconsin. When he was age five, his family moved to Glendale, California. His father, William Frederick Dumke, was a buyer for a southern California grocery business. His mother, Marjorie Schroeder Dumke, was a homemaker who later went to work as a title searcher in Los Angeles.

Dumke attended the University of California, Los Angeles's (UCLA) Training School and graduated from Glendale Hoover High School in 1934. He earned a history degree from Occidental College in 1938; completed an M.A. degree in history from Occidental College; and a Ph.D. in history from UCLA in 1942. At UCLA he studied under John Walton Caughey.

== Career ==
Dumke's first academic job was teaching Western American and Hispanic history at Occidental College. During the 1940s he conducted extensive research and published his most notable historical works, including The Boom of the Eighties in Southern California (1944) and A History of the Pacific Area in Modern Times (1949), co-authored with Osgood Hardy. In 1950 he became Dean of Faculty at Occidental. In 1957 he accepted the position of president at San Francisco State College. Shortly thereafter, he was invited to join the committee creating the California Master Plan for Higher Education (1960), which distinguished among the University of California (UC) system, whose research campuses would offer degrees through the Ph.D., the California State Universities & Colleges (now known as CSU), which would offer bachelor's and master's degrees, and the California Community Colleges, which would offer two-year programs. Dumke was appointed the first vice chancellor for academic affairs of the CSU system. When Buell Gallagher, the first chancellor of the new system, resigned suddenly after only eight months on the job, Dumke was offered the position.

As CSU chancellor from 1962 to 1982, Dumke's accomplishments were significant. Under his leadership 19 separate state colleges became the largest system of higher education in the United States, and enrollment tripled to 319,000 students. He created a system-wide academic senate. He began the practice of meeting monthly with the campus presidents, giving them significant input on system policies. He pushed for strong accreditation standards, and a system-wide general education program. He advocated for admission standards, which the CSU finally adopted in 1990. During his term of office, he helped create four new campuses at Dominguez Hills, Bakersfield, San Bernardino and Sonoma. Dumke was a staunch opponent of student and faculty strikes in the period of unrest from 1965 to 1971, issuing a ban on faculty strikes in 1969. Other initiatives of Dumke include the establishment of off-campus and extension programs in 1971, and a 1978 five-year affirmative action plan to increase enrollment of women and minorities in the CSU.

== Later life ==
After his retirement in 1982, Dumke was president of several think-tanks, including the conservative Institute for Contemporary Studies (1982–1989) and the Foundation for the 21st Century (1986–1989). He also sat on the governing boards for Pepperdine University, University of Redlands, and the California Chamber of Commerce. Among his national awards were the USO Distinguished American Award and the award for Individual Excellence in Education from the Freedoms Foundation. He was a member of a number of social clubs, including the Bohemian Club and the Commonwealth Club of California.

He was married to Dorothy Robinson Dumke for 44 years.

Dumke died on June 30, 1989, of a heart attack in Los Angeles.

== Books by Glenn S. Dumke ==
- The Boom of the Eighties in Southern California (1944; Huntington Library Press, 1991). ISBN 978-0-87328-003-7
- editor, Mexican Gold Trail: The Journal of a Forty-Niner (Huntington Library, 1945; reprinted 2006).
- co-authored with Osgood Hardy, A History of the Pacific Area in Modern Times (1949).
- The Crossing of the Tahachapi by the Southern Pacific (Book Club of California, 1954).
- co-authored with Robert Glass Cleland, From Wilderness to Empire: A History of California (Knopf, 1959).

Dumke wrote several historical novels under the pseudonyms Glenn Pierce (The Tyrant of Bagdad, 1955; and King's Ransom, 1986) and Jordan Allen (The Condor, 1970; Texas Fever, 1980; and Cavern of Silver, 1982).

== See also ==
- Membership discrimination in California social clubs

== Notes ==
Academic offices
Preceded by Buell G. Gallagher	2nd Chancellor of the California State University System; 1962–1982	Succeeded by W. Ann Reynolds
