= Thomas S. K. Chang =

American reproductive biologist

- Born: 1948; Hawaii, United States
- Died: April 13, 1996
- Education: University of Hawaii
- Spouse: Rosemary Chang
- Scientific career
- Fields: Reproductive biology
- Workplaces: Johns Hopkins School of Medicine
- Doctoral students: Debbie Ricker

Thomas S. K. Chang (1948-1996) was an American reproductive biologist. He was born in Hawaii in 1948, and earned a bachelor's degree and Ph.D. from the University of Hawaiʻi in 1970 and 1976. In 1977, he came to The Johns Hopkins School of Hygiene and Public Health to carry out his postdoctoral studies. In 1981, he joined the Department of Urology of The Johns Hopkins School of Medicine to carry out his postdoctoral studies. His studies focus on male infertility in relationship to sperm physiology and endocrinology.

The Thomas S. K. Chang Merit Award, established in 1996, is awarded annually by the American Society of Andrology.
