= Rabab Abdulhadi =

Palestinian-American professor (born 1955)

Rabab Ibrahim Abdulhadi
- Born: 1955 (age 70–71); Nablus, Jordanian-occupied West Bank
- Education: Hunter College (BA), Yale University (MA, MPhil, PhD)
- Known for: Palestinian diaspora, Palestinian activism, Palestinian women's studies, Sociology
- Awards: Georgina M. Smith Award (American Association of University Professors), Jere L. Bacharach Service Award (Middle East Studies Association), Angela Y. Davis Award for Outstanding Public Scholarship (American Studies Association),
- Scientific career
- Fields: Sociology
- Workplaces: University of Michigan–Dearborn, San Francisco State University
- Thesis: "Palestinianness in Comparative Perspective: Inclusionary Resistance, Exclusionary Citizenship" (2000)
- Doctoral advisor: Michele Dillon
- Other academic advisors: Kai Erikson, Debra Minkof

Rabab Ibrahim Abdulhadi (born 1955) is a Palestinian-American scholar, activist, educator, editor, and an academic director born in Jordan-occupied West Bank. She is an Associate Professor of Ethnic Studies, Race and Resistance Studies, and the founding Director of Arab and Muslim Ethnicities and Diasporas Studies (AMED) at San Francisco State University (SFSU). Colleen Flaherty of Inside Higher Education described her as "a controversial figure in an already controversial field".

== Early life and education ==
Rabab Ibrahim Abdulhadi was born in 1955 in Nablus, Jordanian-occupied West Bank, into a Muslim family.

She received a B.A. degree (1994) in women's studies from Hunter College. She then completed a M.A. degree (1995), a M. Phil. degree (1998), and a Ph.D. (2000) in sociology, all from Yale University. Abdulhadi's dissertation, under advisor Michele Dillon, was titled, "Palestinianness in Comparative Perspective: Inclusionary Resistance, Exclusionary Citizenship" (2000).

== Career ==
From 2004 to 2006, she served as the founding Director of the Center for Arab American Studies, and as an associate professor of sociology at University of Michigan–Dearborn.

In January 2007, she joined the faculty at San Francisco State University. Since her hire in 2007, Abdulhadi has been the only faculty within her department, much of which has been supplemented by student research assistants, visiting scholars, and lecturers over the years. In 2018, Abdulhadi formally filed a lawsuit and complaints, and has stated she was promised two faculty positions, at her time of hire.

Abdulhadi has routinely come under fire by Zionist and pro-Israel groups such as the David Horowitz Freedom Center, the AMCHA Initiative, Campus Watch, and the Lawfare Project. Posters at SFSU have circulated multiple times, featuring caricatures of Abdulhadi's likeness in derogatory manner, as well as implying Abdulhadi was involved in terrorist organizations. In 2017, the SFSU Associated Students, Inc. (ASI), the General Union of Palestinian Students (GUPS), and the Black Student Union (BSU) have stood with Abdulhadi and expressed disappointment in how then-university President Leslie E. Wong, and the on-campus police handled the hate speech.

In 2017, the mayor of Jerusalem was to give a speech on the SFSU campus, and was met with student protests. A group of Jewish students accused the school of encouraging antisemitism, led by Abdulhadi and her "anti-Zionist statements". Speaking in support of Abdulhadi, former San Francisco Supervisor Eric Mar stated that such "well-funded campaigns are really harmful to the careers of great community activists and professors like Abdulhadi" and that these actions have a "chilling effect". The issue went to court and 2018, a federal judge found no evidence of discrimination. This event was covered by US national media.

In 2019, Abdulhadi was co-hosting an online talk using SFSU's instance of Zoom by Palestinian political activist and member of the Popular Front for the Liberation of Palestine, Leila Khaled. The night before the event, the university informed Abdulhadi that Zoom would not allow SFSU to use Zoom for the talk, stating that the talk contravened the Zoom terms of service. Though the event was shifted on the scheduled day to YouTube, that shift only lasted for 23 minutes before YouTube shut down the stream, similarly stating it went against YouTube's terms of service. Facebook also shut down the event page, claiming violations of its policies. The United States government considers The Popular Front for the Liberation of Palestine to be a terrorist organization. The Leila Khaled event added to the tense national news debate on the "boundaries and consequences of freedom of expression", and had SFSU President Lynn Mahoney fielding questions about her support and/or lack of support for the Middle Eastern studies program.

In 2024, a guest speech from Abdulhadi at Wake Forest University was cancelled after the planned event received backlash from pro-Israel Jewish students and others. A petition to cancel her speech received over 8000 signatures, accusing Abdulhadi of supporting antisemitism and Hamas in the wake of the Gaza genocide. She delivered her lecture at a local church in Winston-Salem.

She is a member of the Democratic Socialists of America.

== Awards ==
Abdulhadi has received several awards from national and international academic, civic, and professional organizations in recognition for her work and community service. Notable awards include:

- 2004, New Century Scholarship, J. William Fulbright Foreign Scholarship Board
- 2020, Georgina M. Smith Award by the Association of American University Professors
- 2023, Jere L. Bacharach Service Award by the Middle East Studies Association, "recognizing her lifelong work for freedom and liberation"
- 2023, American Studies Association's Angela Y. Davis Award for Outstanding Public Scholarship
- Lucius Walker Community Organizing Award by the Interreligious Foundation for Community Organizing
- Annual Alex Odeh Memorial Award, American-Arab Anti-Discrimination Committee
- Courage Award, American Muslims for Palestine
- Community Leadership Award, American Muslims for Palestine

== Publications ==
=== Books ===
- Abdulhadi, Rabab; Alsultany, Evelyn; Naber, Nadine, eds. (2011). Arab and Arab American Feminisms: Gender, Violence, and Belonging. Syracuse University Press. ISBN 9780815651239.

=== Articles and chapters ===
- Abdulhadi, Rabab (Winter 2005). "Tread Lightly: Teaching Gender and Sexuality in Time of War". Journal of Women's History. 17 (4). Johns Hopkins University Press: 154–158. doi:10.1353/jowh.2005.0040. S2CID 144865347.
- Abdulhadi, Rabab Ibrahim (2009). "Whose 1960s? Gender, Resistance and Liberation in Palestine". In Dubinsky, Karen; Krull, Catherine; Lord, Susan; Rutherford, Scott; Mills, Sean (eds.). New World Coming: The Sixties and the Shaping of Global Consciousness. Between the Lines. ISBN 9781897071519.
- Abdulhadi, Rabab (April 4, 2012). "Debating Palestine: Representation, Resistance, and Liberation". Al-Shabaka, The Palestinian Policy Network.
- Abdulhadi, Rabab; Olwan, Dana M. (December 2015). "Introduction: Shifting Geographies of Knowledge and Power: Palestine and American Studies". American Quarterly. 67 (4): 993–1006. doi:10.1353/aq.2015.0075. S2CID 146409698.
- Abdulhadi, Rabab Ibrahim (Fall 2018). "Framing Resistance Call and Response: Reading Assata Shakur's Black Revolutionary Radicalism in Palestine". Women's Studies Quarterly. 46 (3). The Feminist Press at the City University of New York: 226–231. doi:10.1353/wsq.2018.0043. JSTOR 26511343. S2CID 91832980.

== See also ==
- Marc Lamont Hill
- Steven Salaita
