= Gerald Nazareth =

Hong Kong senior judge

Non-Permanent Judge of the Court of Final Appeal
- In office 2000–2012

Personal details
- Born: 27 January 1932 British Kenya

Gerald Paul Nazareth CBE, GBS (Chinese: 黎守律; 27 January 1932 – 13 August 2018) was a Hong Kong senior judge, who served in Hong Kong, Brunei and Bermuda.

Gerald Nazareth was born in British Kenya. He was educated at the Catholic Parochial School in Nairobi and St. Xavier's College and Government Law College in Mumbai. Mr. Nazareth was called to the English Bar at Lincoln's Inn.

Mr. Nazareth joined the Kenyan Public Service in 1954, as a prosecutor. He rose to the position of Senior Counsel. He moved to the British Solomon Islands in 1963 to take up the appointment of Assistant Attorney General. He subsequently became the Solicitor General and then Attorney General to the British Western Pacific High Commission. Mr. Nazareth also became a member of the island's Legislative and Executive Councils and was Deputy Governor for a short time.

In 1976, he transferred to Hong Kong and joined the Hong Kong Legal Department as Assistant Principal Crown Counsel. In 1977, he was promoted to Principal Crown Counsel. Mr. Nazareth served as Law Officer between 1979 and 1985. He was appointed Queen's Counsel in 1981. He played an important role in drafting the Sino-British Joint Declaration regarding the establishment of the Hong Kong Special Administrative Region. He served as a judge in Hong Kong from 1985. He retired to London in 2000, however he continued to be a non-permanent judge of the Court of Final Appeal in Hong Kong until 2012. He also served as a Justice of the Court of Appeal of Bermuda from 2001-2010.

Gerald Nazareth died in the UK on 13 August 2018, aged 86. He is survived by his wife, three daughters and nine grandchildren.

== Judicial career ==
Gerald Nazareth was appointed a Judge of the High Court in Hong Kong in 1985. He became a Justice of Appeal on the Court of Appeal in 1991. Mr. Nazareth played a key part in arranging the swearing in of judges within hours of the handover of Hong Kong in 1997. He was one of the non-permanent judges of the Court of Final Appeal in Hong Kong from 1997 to 2012.

== Honours ==
For his dedicated and distinguished service to the Crown and the British Overseas Civil Service, Mr Justice Nazareth was presented with the OBE in 1975 and the CBE in 1985.

In 2000, he received the Gold Bauhinia Star honour for serving Hong Kong judiciary for more than 24 years in excellence.

Order of precedence
Preceded by David Lan; Recipients of the Gold Bauhinia Star	Hong Kong order of precedence Recipients of the Gold Bauhinia Star	Succeeded by Woo Chia-wei; Recipients of the Gold Bauhinia Star
