= Huntington Library Press =

American publisher

The Huntington Library Press (HLP), established in 1920, is one of the oldest book publishers in Southern California. It is a part of the Huntington Library, and primarily a publisher of journals (including the Huntington Library Quarterly), scholarly books, and conference papers.

HLP also publishes exhibition catalogs, visitor publications, and facsimiles from its collections, and issues books in cooperation with other publishers in the United States, England, and Japan.
