= Multimedia Gulch =

Neighborhood in San Francisco

Multimedia Gulch was part of the SoMa district of San Francisco, California which contained many early computer multimedia focused companies in the 1990s. The name was a reference to Silicon Valley which is also in the San Francisco Bay Area.

It was described as "bounded by Market Street to the north, the Embarcadero to the east, Townsend Street to the south and Division Street to the west".
