= Lynn Mahoney =

American university president

14th President of San Francisco State University
- In office July 1, 2019 – 2027
- Preceded by: Leslie Wong

Personal details
- Born: May 19, 1964 (age 62)
- Spouse: Charles Ponce de Leon
- Children: 2
- Education: Stanford University (BA); Rutgers University (PhD)
- Occupation: University president, administrator, author, social historian

Academic background
- Thesis: Near the edge: Elizabeth Stoddard and the boundaries of Victorian culture (1991)
- Doctoral advisor: T.J. Jackson Lears

Academic work
- Discipline: History
- Institutions: State University of New York at Purchase; California State University, Long Beach; California State University, Los Angeles; San Francisco State University

Lynn Mahoney (born 1964) is an American university president, author, and social historian. Mahoney is the president of San Francisco State University (SFSU) since July 2019, and is the first woman to hold this role. Her scholarly work has focused on United States history, women's history, feminism, race studies, and ethnicity. She is the author of Elizabeth Stoddard and the Boundaries of Bourgeois Culture (2004, Routledge); a book about novelist and poet Elizabeth Stoddard.

== Biography ==
Lynn Mahoney was born on May 19, 1964, in the United States. She attended Stanford University, graduating with a Bachelor of Arts degree (1986) in American studies, and then received a Ph.D. in history in 1999 from Rutgers University.

She is married to history professor Charles Ponce de Leon, together they have two children.

Prior to her role at SFSU, she previously worked at State University of New York at Purchase; California State University, Long Beach (August 2008 – 2015); and California State University, Los Angeles (February 2015 – 2019) as the Provost and Vice President of Academic Affairs.

=== San Francisco State University ===
In July 2019, Mahoney succeeded Leslie Wong, to serve as the 14th President of San Francisco State University and the first woman President. During her tenure was the COVID-19 pandemic, which forced a move towards online classes, budget shortfalls, and staff cuts.

In September 2020, SFSU faculty Rabab Abdulhadi and Tomomi Kinukawa were hosting a virtual class lecture on Zoom (software) by Leila Khaled, a Palestinian political activist with a militant history, when the Zoom canceled the broadcast due to the company's support of a pro-Zionism stance. The Leila Khaled event brought SFSU into a tense national news debate on the "boundaries and consequences of freedom of expression", and had Mahoney fielding questions about her support and/or lack of support for the Middle Eastern studies program.

In April 2023, Turning Point USA an American conservative non-profit organization student chapter at SFSU hosted a Riley Gaines event where she spoke against the participation of trans women in women's sports. After the event concluded, protesters arrived. Mahoney publicly spoke out against the Gaines event and negative effect on the LGBTQ campus community. Gaines claimed she was assaulted twice by a man after the event, and insisted that women need protection.

In September 2026, Mahoney announced her retirement in the summer of 2027, which received mixed emotions from staff and students.

== Publications ==
- Mahoney, Lynn (2004). Cain, Willam (ed.). Elizabeth Stoddard and the Boundaries of Bourgeois Culture. Studies in Major Literary Authors. New York City, NY: Routledge. ISBN 9781135883416.
