= Woo Chia-wei =

Hong Kong physicist and educator (1937–2025)

Chia-Wei Woo GBS CBE

Inaugural President of Hong Kong University of Science and Technology
- In office 1991–2001
- Chancellor: David Wilson; Chris Patten; Tung Chee-hwa
- Preceded by: Office established
- Succeeded by: Chu Ching-wu

11th President of San Francisco State University
- In office 1983–1988
- Preceded by: Paul F. Romberg
- Succeeded by: Robert A. Corrigan

Personal details
- Born: 13 November 1937 Shanghai, China
- Died: 2 March 2025 (aged 87) San Francisco, California, U.S.
- Education: Georgetown College (BS); WUSTL (MA, PhD)
- Scientific career
- Awards: 1996 CBE; 2000 GBS; 2001 Chevalier de la Légion d'Honneur
- Fields: Physics
- Workplaces: Northwestern University; UC San Diego; San Francisco State
- Thesis: Theory of the normal ground state of liquid helium three (1966)
- Doctoral advisor: Eugene Feenberg

Chia-Wei Woo GBS CBE (traditional Chinese: 吳家瑋; simplified Chinese: 吴家玮; pinyin: Wú Jiāwěi; 13 November 1937 – 2 March 2025) was a Hong Kong physicist and educator who was the inaugural president of the Hong Kong University of Science and Technology. His work included raising funding and recruiting outstanding faculty for the university. With Chung Sze Yuen, Woo created an institution, including a top-ranked Business School, known as the HKUST Business School. The school's MBA, EMBA and Executive Education programmes have been consistently ranked as Asia's top programmes, and in the World Top 50 MBA programmes by the Financial Times of London. Woo retired in 2001 after 13 years of service and remained President Emeritus as well as University Professor Emeritus.

== Education and academia ==
Born in Shanghai in 1937, Woo received his secondary education from Pui Ching Middle School in Hong Kong and went to the US in 1955, where he acquired his BS degree in Physics/Mathematics at Georgetown College in Kentucky, and his MA degree in Physics at Washington University in St. Louis. He went on to pursue his PhD at Washington University in St. Louis under Eugene Feenberg. Later, he taught at Northwestern University and at the University of Illinois, served as Northwestern's chairman, Physics and Astronomy Department, then as Provost, Revelle College, U.C. San Diego (where he had pursued post-doctoral work). In 1983, at the age of 45, he became president of San Francisco State University, the first Chinese American to head a major university in the United States.

From 1964, Woo published 120 papers and books in various fields of physics, particularly in quantum many-body theory, statistical mechanics, liquid crystals, low temperature physics, and surface physics.

== Political career ==
Woo served on Hong Kong Government's Industry and Technology Development Council and the Board of Overseers for the Institutes of Biotechnology, and was appointed by the Municipal Government of Shenzhen as Senior Adviser. He served on governing and advisory boards of the Business and Professionals Federation of Hong Kong, the Shanghai-Hong Kong Council for the Promotion and Development of Yangtze, the National Natural Science Foundation of China, Fudan University, Hua Qiao University, Zhongguancun Science Park (Advisory Committee), Ghulam Ishaq Khan Institute of Engineering Sciences and Technology (Pakistan), World Scientific Publishing Company (Singapore), and China Europe International Business School.

From 1993–96, he was appointed by the Chinese government, first as a Hong Kong Affairs Adviser, then a Member of the Preliminary Working Committee, and then a Member of the Preparatory Committee, and was elected to the Selection Committee for the HKSAR. He was appointed in 1998 to the Commission on Strategic Development of the HKSAR and the Chinese People's Political Consultative Conference. In 2000, he was appointed to the Council of Advisers on Innovation and Technology of the HKSAR, and as Chairman of the Committee on Hong Kong – Mainland Technological Collaboration. He spoke multiple times at the World Economic Forum in Davos, Switzerland.

== Death ==
Woo died in San Francisco, California on 2 March 2025, at the age of 87.

== Honours and awards ==
Woo received many honours and awards for professional achievement and civic contribution, including Fellowships of the American Physical Society and the California Academy of Sciences; the Alfred P. Sloan Research Fellowship; Honorary Professorships at Fudan University, Chinese Academy of Sciences (Institute of Physics), Shenzhen University, and Peking University; the Eleanor Roosevelt Humanitarian Award by the United Nations Association; the Golden Key of the City of San Francisco; Chia-Wei Woo Day was declared by the Mayor of San Francisco.

He was National President of the National Association of Chinese-Americans during 1984–86. He was the US China Olympics Liaison for the 1984 Summer Olympics, held in Los Angeles. In 1991, he received a Distinguished Alumnus Award from his alma mater, Washington University. In 1995, Woo received an honorary Doctor of Letters degree from Georgetown College, and was named an Honorary Citizen by the Municipal Government of Shenzhen. In 1996, he received a Distinguished International Service Award from the University of Minnesota and an honorary Doctor of Science degree from Washington University; and was appointed a Commander of the Most Excellent Order of the British Empire (CBE) by Queen Elizabeth II. In 2000, he was awarded the Gold Bauhinia Star by the Government of the Hong Kong Special Administrative Region (HKSAR). In 2001, he was awarded "Chevalier de la Légion d'Honneur" by the President of the French Republic.

Academic offices
Preceded by Paul F. Romberg	President of San Francisco State University; 1983–1988	Succeeded by Robert A. Corrigan
New institution	President of the Hong Kong University of Science and Technology; 1991–2001	Succeeded by Chu Ching-wu
Order of precedence
Preceded by Gerald Nazareth; Recipients of the Gold Bauhinia Star	Hong Kong order of precedence Recipients of the Gold Bauhinia Star	Succeeded by Lee Hon-chiu; Recipients of the Gold Bauhinia Star
