= Robert A. Corrigan =

American academic (1935–2024)

Robert Anthony Corrigan

12th President of San Francisco State University
- In office 1988–2012
- Preceded by: Chia-Wei Woo
- Succeeded by: Leslie Wong

Personal details
- Born: April 21, 1935 New London, Connecticut, US
- Died: July 5, 2024 (aged 89) San Francisco, US
- Spouse: Joyce Mobley
- Education: Brown University, University of Pennsylvania
- Occupation: University president, academic

Robert Anthony Corrigan (April 21, 1935 – July 5, 2024) was an American academic who served as the 12th president of San Francisco State University from 1988 to 2012.

Before that, Corrigan served nine years as chancellor of the University of Massachusetts Boston from 1979 to 1988.

== Early life and education ==
Corrigan was born on April 21, 1935. He attained an A.B. from Brown University and later completed a A.M. (1959) and Ph.D. in American civilization (1967) from the University of Pennsylvania.

== Career ==
Corrigan was a provost at the University of Maryland, College Park, and dean at the University of Missouri, in addition to holding faculty positions at the University of Iowa, Bryn Mawr, the University of Pennsylvania, and the University of Gothenburg in Sweden.

Corrigan was a member of the National Cancer Institute's Comprehensive Minority Bio-medical Branch Task Force and the National Advisory Council for Campus Compact. He was immediate chair of the board of directors of the Association of American Colleges and Universities (AAC&U).

In January 2007, Corrigan began his second and final term as chair of the Board of Directors of the San Francisco Chamber of Commerce. He also served on the San Francisco Mayor's Biotechnology Advisory Council. He was a member of the San Francisco Economic Development Corporation, the California Historical Society Board of Directors, and the Private Industry Council of San Francisco. In between 1994 and 1995, he served on the Mayor's Blue Ribbon Budget Task Force; furthermore he was a past co-chair of the Bay Area School Reform Collaborative/Annenberg Challenge.

In the fall of 2011, Corrigan announced plans to retire by the end of that academic year concluding in May 2012. On April 17, 2012, Lynne Woolsey spoke before the Assembly to announce Corrigan's retirement, and to acknowledge achievements and contributions during his 24-years of service and tenure at San Francisco State University. Subsequently, Leslie E. Wong succeeded Corrigan as president of San Francisco State University.

On May 24, 2015, Brown University awarded Corrigan an honorary doctorate (honoris causa) for his work in promoting diversity and tolerance.

== Personal life and death ==
In 1970, Corrigan met Joyce Mobley at the University of Iowa. The two were married in 1975. Mobley had children from previous relationships; her oldest son is George Russell Jr., a serial killer responsible for murdering three women in Washington in 1990. Corrigan had a daughter and two sons from his first marriage.

Corrigan died on July 5, 2024, at the age of 89.
