= Elizabeth Wright (educator) =

Founder, secretary and bursar of Connecticut College (1910-1943)

- Born: November 14, 1876; Hartford, Connecticut, U.S.
- Died: February 23, 1963 (aged 86)
- Education: Wesleyan University (BA)
- Known for: Founding Connecticut College

Elizabeth C. Wright (November 14, 1876 – February 23, 1963) was one of the founders of Connecticut College (formerly Connecticut College for Women). She served as the first Secretary of the college from 1910 to 1921 and as the college's bursar from 1917 to 1943.

== Early life ==
Wright was born on November 14, 1876, in Hartford, Connecticut. She obtained her Bachelor of Arts from Wesleyan University in 1897 where she was a member of the Delta Delta Delta sorority. and went on to teach at Portland (CT) High School and Hartford Public High School.

== Founding Connecticut College ==
In 1872, Wesleyan University began what was known as the "Wesleyan Experiment", allowing women to take classes at the College. Four women matriculated that fall, and it was the first time in the Connecticut region that a woman stayed enrolled in classes beyond her first term. Male alumni, though, were concerned that the College would become populated only by women, and that the College was less prestigious with women attending. In turn, they voted to stop admitting women in 1912.

Upon learning that there were no longer any educational options for higher education for women in the state of Connecticut, Elizabeth Wright began contacting other colleges and universities in the region and asking them to allow women to take classes. When this proved unsuccessful, Wright contacted E.V. Mitchell, president of the women's Hartford College Club, an organization for women with college educations, with her idea of opening a women's college in Connecticut.

E.V. Mitchell appointed a committee of herself, Elizabeth Wright, and Mary Partridge to work on the founding of a women's college. The committee eventually expanded in order to handle real business, and had offers of land for the women's institution in more than twenty cities in Connecticut. The city of New London offered a site for the college, fundraised $135,000 in ten days, and was chosen as the location for what would become Connecticut College for Women. A local business man, Morton Plant, endowed $1 million in the College.

== Career ==
Wright's original office was in the Mohican Hotel, where she worked as the College's first secretary until the opening of the first campus building in 1915. From there, she moved to New London Hall, where she worked as secretary, bursar, and served on the board of trustees. She worked as Secretary of the College from 1910-1921, and as Bursar from 1921 until her retirement in 1943. In 1935, Wright founded the Connecticut College Delta chapter of Phi Beta Kappa, a national honor society. That same year, Wright was awarded an honorary Master of Arts degree from the College.

== Legacy ==
In 1960, Elizabeth Wright published a novel titled The Force of Circumstances about a young Irish girl during wartime. The publication came as a surprise to those around her, as Wright had kept everything involving the book a secret.

In 1961, it was announced that one of the new dormitories at Connecticut College was to be named in Wright's honor. Today, Wright House is located in the North Complex of dorms at the College, and houses students of all genders and class years.
