= J. Paul Leonard =

American university president (1901–1995)

5th President of San Francisco State University
- In office 1945–1957
- Preceded by: Alexander C. Roberts
- Succeeded by: Glenn Dumke

5th President of American University of Beirut
- In office 1957–1961
- Preceded by: Constantin Zureiq
- Succeeded by: Norman Burns

Personal details
- Born: John Paul Leonard; December 2, 1901 Lockwood, Missouri, U.S.
- Died: February 24, 1995 (aged 93) Walnut Creek, California, U.S.
- Resting place: Oakmont Memorial Park
- Spouse: Johnnie Lucille Ferguson (m. 1927–1995)
- Children: 2
- Education: Drury University, Teachers College, Columbia University

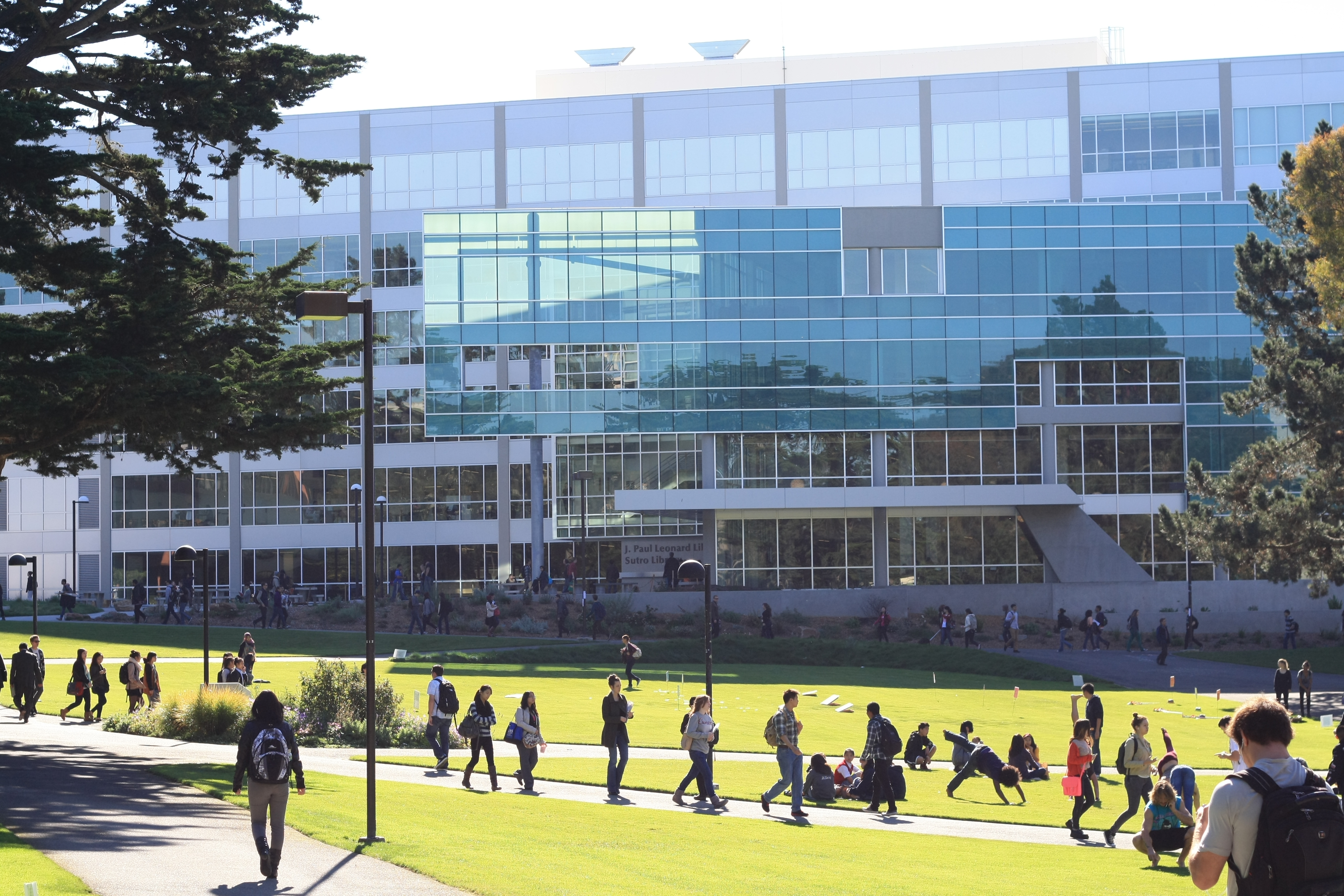
The J. Paul Leonard Library and Sutro Library (2012) at SFSU, viewed from Malcolm X Plaza

John Paul Leonard (1901–1995) was an American educator, and university president. He was the 5th President of San Francisco State University (SFSU) serving from 1945 to 1957; and the 5th President of American University of Beirut serving from 1957 to 1961.

== Early life and education ==
John Paul Leonard was born on December 2, 1901, in Lockwood, Missouri.

Leonard attended Drury University (formerly Drury College), and received a degree in 1923. After his undergraduate graduation he taught in the Springfield Public Schools. Leonard attended Teachers College, Columbia University, and received a master's degree in 1927, followed by his Ph.D. His dissertation was titled "The Use of Practice Exercises in Teaching Capitalization and Punctuation."

== Career ==
Leonard taught at the College of William & Mary; and at Stanford University in academic administration.

In 1945, Leonard became San Francisco State University's president. During his 12-year tenure Leonard moved the SFSU campus from Haight and Buchanan streets in Lower Haight to its present location in the Parkmerced neighborhood. The move allowed for the school to grow and accommodate the post-World War II influx of students, up to 10,000 enrollees. In order to accomplish this goal, Leonard and students needed to appeal to then-mayor Roger Lapham, which only narrowly won legislative approval. Additionally Leonard reorganized SFSUs academics by combining related academic departments into seven divisions, and they started offering master's degrees.

From 1961 until 1967, Leonard was a professor at the Teachers College, Columbia and worked on the "India Project", which resulted in the publishing of academic periodicals, The Indian Educational Mental Measurement Yearbook, and the quarterly The Journal of Indian Education.

Leonard received honorary degrees from Columbia University in 1954, Drury College in 1962, and the University of the Pacific in 1968.

== Death and legacy ==
He died on February 24, 1995, in Walnut Creek, California. The main library at SFSU was named in his honor in 1977.
