= Leslie Wong =

American academic (born 1949)

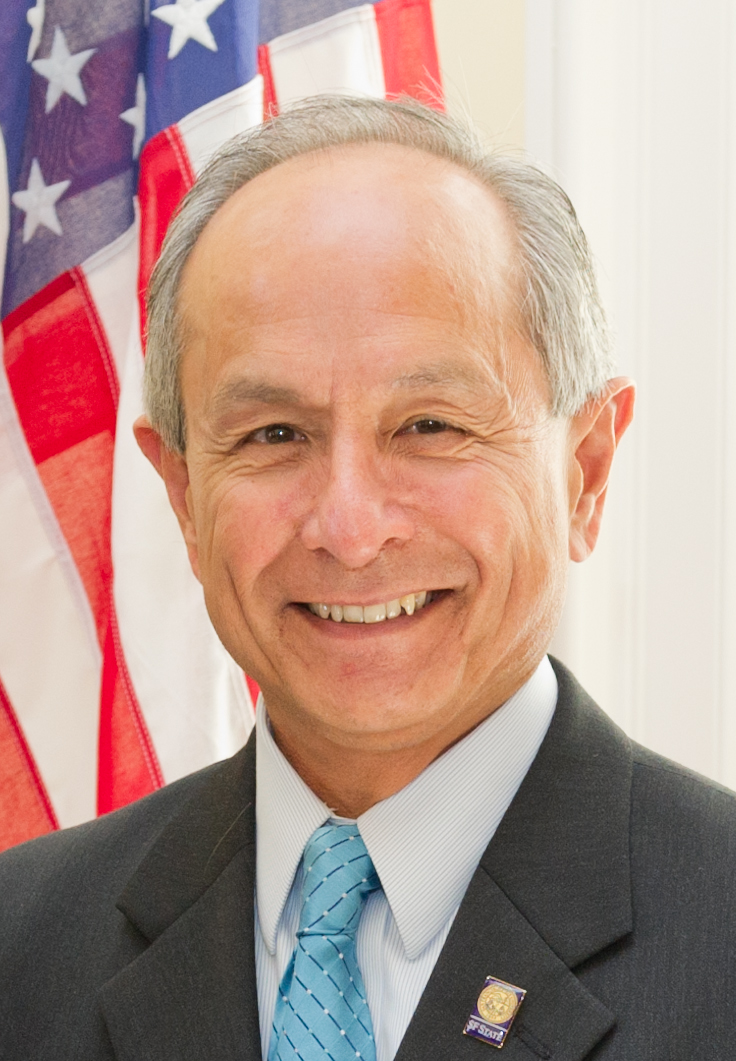

President of Connecticut College
- Acting
- In office July 1, 2023 – July 1, 2024
- Preceded by: Katherine Bergeron
- Succeeded by: Andrea Chapdelaine

13th President of San Francisco State University
- In office August 1, 2012 – July 1, 2019
- Preceded by: Robert A. Corrigan
- Succeeded by: Lynn Mahoney

President of Northern Michigan University
- In office 2004–2012
- Preceded by: Michael Roy (acting)
- Succeeded by: David Haynes (acting)

Personal details
- Spouse: Phyllis Wong
- Education: Gonzaga University (BA); Eastern Washington University (MA); Washington State University (PhD)

Leslie Eric Wong (born 1949) is an American academic, university administrator, and psychology professor. He was President of Northern Michigan University and San Francisco State University. Effective July 1st, 2023, he became the interim President of Connecticut College.

== Personal and educational background ==
Wong is of Chinese and Mexican descent. After graduating from Bishop O'Dowd High School in Oakland, California, Wong received his B.A. from Gonzaga University in 1972, his master's degree in experimental psychology from Eastern Washington University in 1974, and his doctoral degree in educational psychology from Washington State University in 1986.

== Career ==
From 1974 to 1988, Wong taught psychology at Pierce College, a community college in Tacoma, Washington. Wong was also women's varsity tennis coach at Pierce from 1975 to 1981. Wong later was a psychology professor at The Evergreen State College from 1988 to 1996 and was a dean at the college from 1990 to 1996.

Wong joined the University of Southern Colorado (now Colorado State University Pueblo) as provost and academic vice president in 1996 and was interim president of the university from January to June 30, 1997. Wong returned to his previous provost position and stayed until 1999. From 1999 to 2004, Wong was vice president for academic affairs at Valley City State University in North Dakota.

From 2004 to 2012, Wong served as president of Northern Michigan University.

Wong was named by the California State University Board of Trustees as the 13th president of San Francisco State University on May 10, 2012, and began his new position as president on August 1. Dr. Wong announced on October 1, 2018, that he would retire on July 1, 2019.

In 2017 Wong was accused of permitting the exclusion of Jewish student pro-Israel activists from campus activities. Although San Francisco State blamed a "self-organized and self-appointed planning committee", a lawsuit alleged that university administration was complicit. Wong said: "Am I comfortable opening up the gates to everyone? Gosh, of course not.” In 2019 the university reversed its anti-Israel policy, and Wong apologized, stating that "Zionists are welcome on our campus."

In 2023, he was selected to be the interim president of Connecticut College in New London, Connecticut.

== Personal life ==
Wong is married to Phyllis Wong.
