= Lucas Valley =

Unincorporated community in California, United States

- Unincorporated community
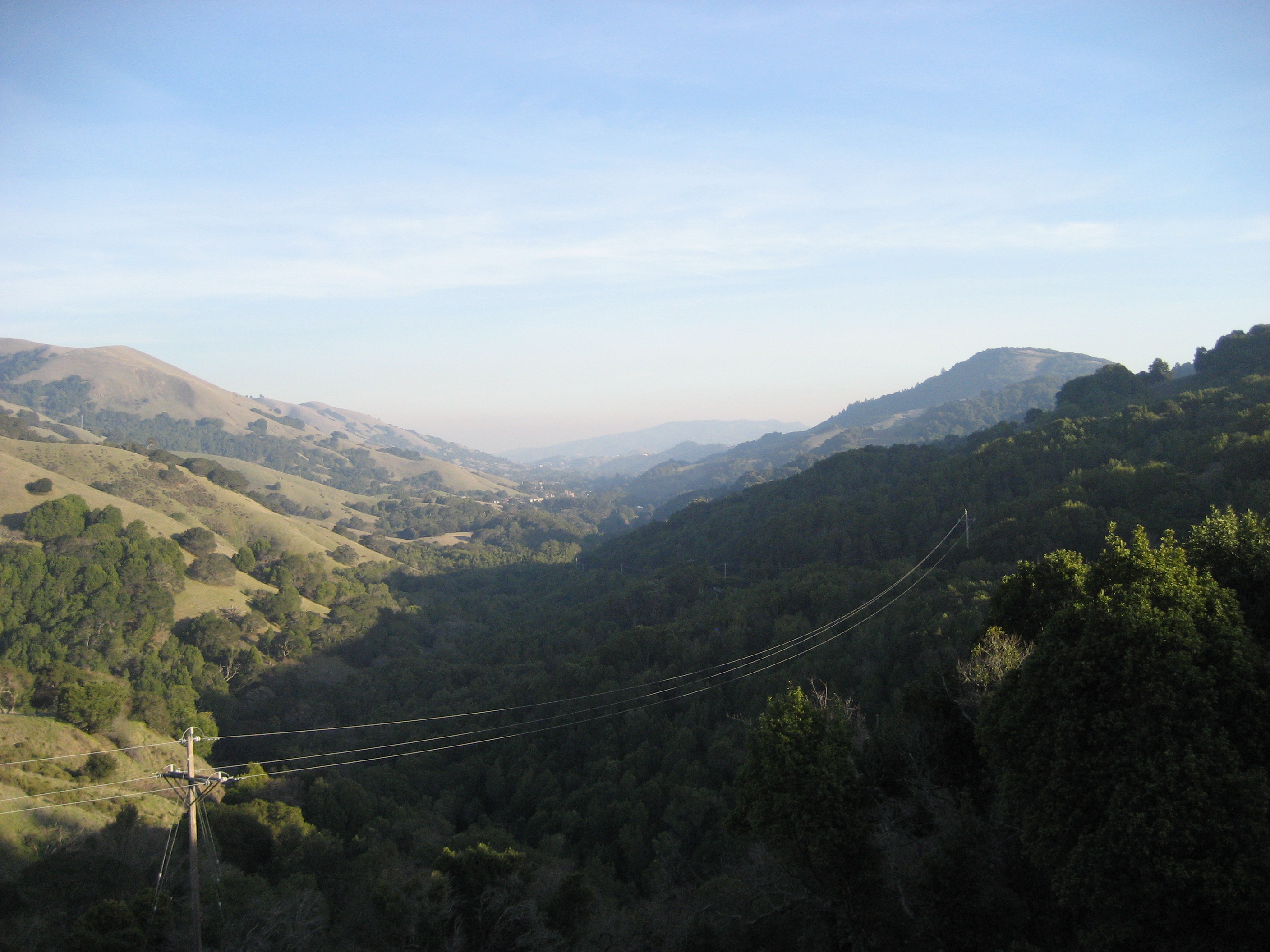
- Lucas Valley, California

- Location in California Lucas Valley (the United States)
- Coordinates: 38°01′39″N 122°33′30″W
- Country: United States
- State: California
- County: Marin County
- Elevation: 108 ft (33 m)

Lucas Valley is a valley in Marin County, California, drained to the east into San Pablo Bay by Miller Creek, as well as an unincorporated community in the valley, which forms part of the Lucas Valley-Marinwood CDP.

Lucas Valley Road traverses the length of the valley, linking it to Gallinas Valley to the east and Nicasio Valley to the west. According to the United States Geological Survey, the suburban developments along Miller Creek (including the Lucas Valley-Marinwood CDP) are actually in Gallinas Valley.

== History ==
Lucas Valley was part of the Rancho San Pedro, Santa Margarita y Las Gallinas grant, a parcel of 21,678.69 acres (8,773.05 ha) awarded to Timothy (Don Timoteo) Murphy on February 14, 1844. John Lucas inherited the Santa Margarita rancho (which included Lucas Valley) in 1853.

In 1978, film director George Lucas began acquiring land in the area for his Skywalker Ranch. However, Lucas Valley Road was named after the 19th-century rancher, who is not related to George Lucas.
