= San Rafael Fire Department =

California fire department

Coordinates: 37°58′25″N 122°31′52″W

Operational area
- Country: United States
- State: California
- City: San Rafael

Agency overview
- Annual calls: 12,004 (2023)
- Employees: 82 (Full-Time 2023)
- Annual budget: $23,570,766 (2023)
- Staffing: Career
- Fire chief: Abraham (Abe) Roman
- IAFF: 1775

Facilities and equipment
- Battalions: 1
- Stations: 6
- Engines: 6
- Trucks: 1
- Ambulances: 4 (2 Full-Time - 2 Cross-Staffed)
- Wildland: 2 (1 type 3, 1 Type 6)
- Fireboats: 1

Website
- Official website
- IAFF website

The San Rafael Fire Department (SRFD) provides fire and emergency medical services to the City of San Rafael, California. The San Rafael Fire Department serves an estimated population of 72,000 people with approximately 70 firefighting and emergency medical field personnel. The ISO Class 1 department responds to, on average, approximately 9,000 emergency calls annually, with about 70% being emergency medical calls. EMS patients are transported to the hospital of their choice, unless the call is urgent.

The department staffs six stations with 23 personnel daily. Strategically located throughout the city are six frontline Type 1 engines, two brush engines an aerial ladder truck, two frontline ambulances, and a battalion chief each shift. An additional engine is cross-staffed by the crew of the frontline truck, and two additional ambulances and are cross-staffed by the crews of an Engine 55 and Engine 56. County wide mutual aid provides relief and additional support during large scale incidents and during high call volume. Because the majority (70%) of calls are EMS related, a paramedic is onboard all engines. Also, one additional ambulance is stored at Station 55 (Medic 55) and another at Station 56 (Medic 56). While these units are not staffed full-time, they are cross-staffed by the crew of the engine companies and can respond if Medic 52 and Medic 57 are committed to other calls. In 2021, the department responded to 9,088 total calls, up from 7,041 in 2012.

== History ==
The San Rafael Fire Department was first organized on December 5, 1874, when William Miller and J.B. Rice posted a notice in the Marin County Journal, calling for volunteer firemen. The organization was first named the "San Rafael Hose Company Number One" but was then renamed the "San Rafael Hose, Hook and Ladder Company" to show the range of their equipment. There were 45 volunteers from a variety of trades including a justice of the peace and a school superintendent and were led by sheriff James Tunstede. Their first major appliance was a hose cart which was pulled by hand to a hydrant. The water supply of San Rafael used gravity to provide pressure and so a pump was not required. By the 1890s, the company had 90 volunteer members, two hand pulled hose carts, two hose carriages and one hook and ladder wagon that was pulled by a rented team of horses when needed.

In 1945, the first full-time Fire Chief, Fred Schueuer was hired. In the mid-1980s, the first fire station had to be remodeled and upgraded. In that era, there was one station in San Rafael with 250 hydrants and 15 paid firefighters as well as a host of volunteers. In 2008, led by firefighter Dave Holland, the San Rafael Fire Department upgraded its fire engines with the installation of solar panels on the vehicles. The electricity generated would be used to power computers, flashlights, and other equipment on the fire engine, so as to avoid depleting the vehicle's batteries or wasting fuel to recharge the batteries.

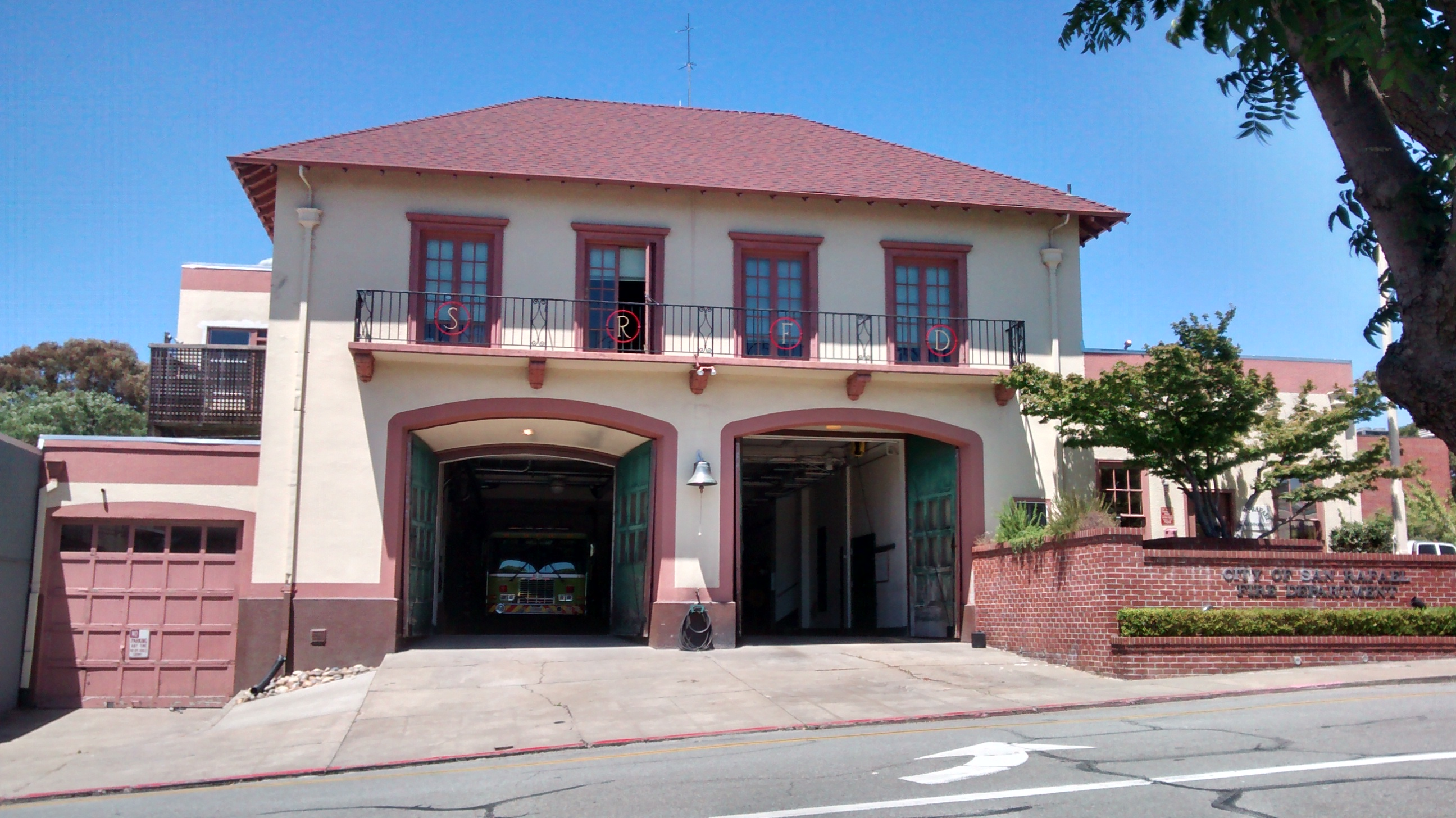
The old Fire Station 51 (since demolished) in June 2014.

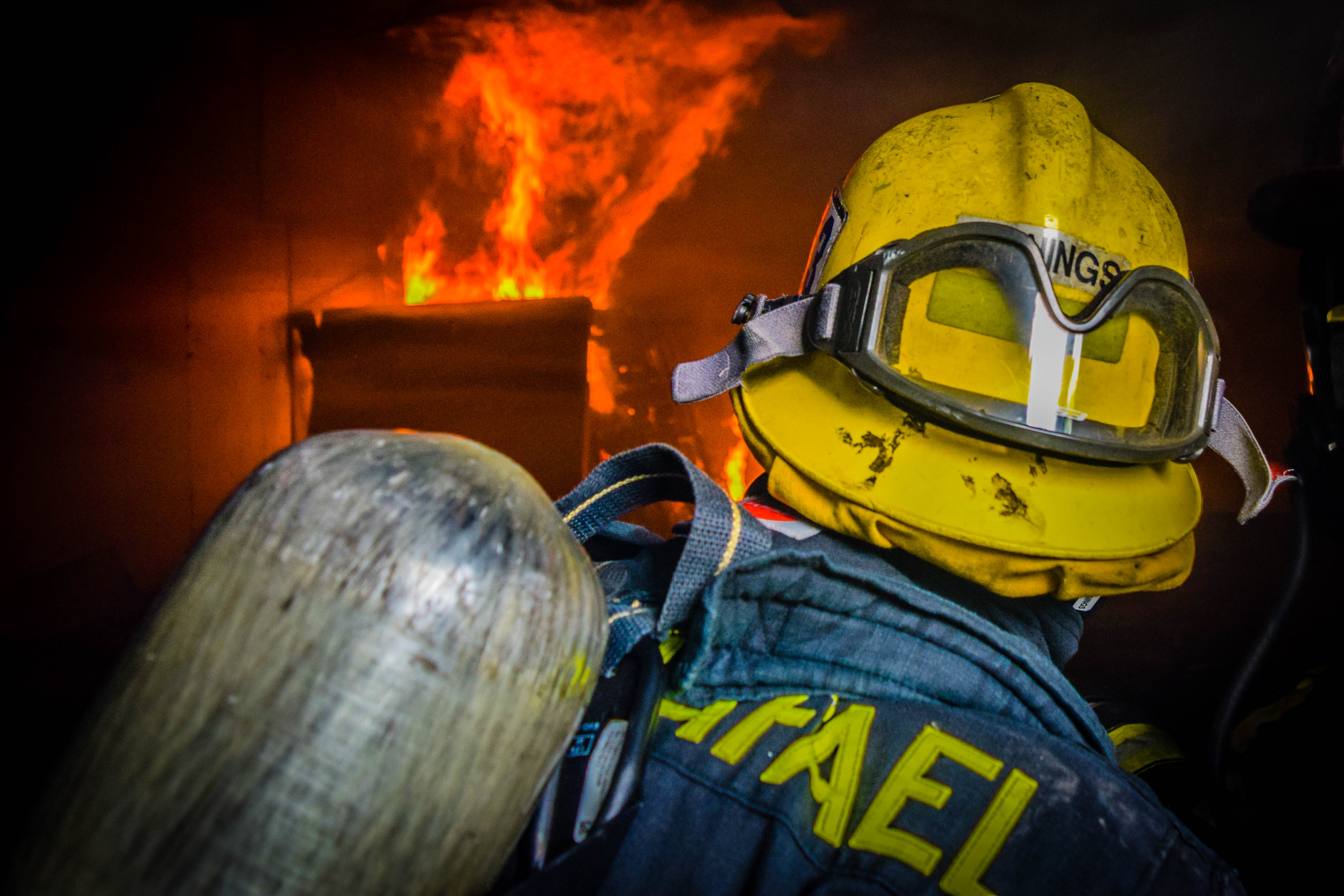

The San Rafael Fire Department and Marinwood Fire Department have a shared services agreement with SRFD providing Marinwood Chief Officer's services.

The department is updating or reconstructing many of its stations. In 2016, plans were released for brand new fire stations 51, 52, and 57. Stations 54 and 55 would be dramatically remodeled. While this is happening, many new apparatus have been acquired, moving from a yellow color scheme to a more classic, red. The department took delivery of a 105' Pierce aerial ladder truck on August 31, 2015, and two Pierce engines on April 29, 2017. These apparatus are red, consistent with two 2013 KME engines, and three 2018 Ford Horton ambulances. In 2020, the department took delivery of an additional red, 2019 Pierce engine. With this delivery, each station's frontline apparatus is now red. In October 2017, the 100 year old station 51 was torn down and replaced with a Public Safety Center which opened in 2020.

In April 2019, new Fire Station 52 was opened, housing Engine 52 and Medic 52 (renamed from Medic 51). In November 2019, new Fire Station 57 opened, housing Engine 57, Medic 57 (renamed from Medic 53), Engine 652, Utility 57 and an ATV to use in nearby China Camp State park. In July 2020, new Fire Station 51 was opening in the city's Public Safety Center. In addition to housing Engine 51, the Public Safety Center also houses the city's Police Department, Office of Emergency Service, and Fire Administration including the Fire Chief, Deputy Fire Chiefs, and Battalion Chiefs.

== Notable Incidents and Awards ==
In 2013, the department was praised for rescuing a horse which had fallen into a well. Water was pumped into the well to float the animal to the surface where a crane was then used to lift it out.

The department was granted an ISO Class 1 rating, the highest level available, in 2016.

== Station & Apparatus locations ==
The SRFD has 6 stations spread across the city. Station 55 and Station 56 are cross-staffed with the 3rd/4th out ambulances. Additional reserve apparatus, including a truck and multiple medic units, are kept at the city maintenance yard.

Fire Station Number	Address	Engine Company or Reserve Engine	Truck Company	Medic Units	Cross-Staffed Medic Units	Other units
51	1375 5th Ave	Engine 51				Type 6 Engine 751
52	52 Union St	Engine 52, Engine 59 (Reserve)		Medic Unit 52		Battalions 52/53/54, Utility 52
54	46 Castro Ave	Engine 54 (cross staffed)	Truck 54			Type 3 Engine 654, Utility 54
55	955 Point San Pedro Rd	Engine 55, Engine 53 (Reserve)			Medic 55	Fire Boat, Utility 55
56	650 Del Ganado Rd	Engine 56			Medic 56	Air trailer
57	3530 Civic Center Dr	Engine 57	Truck 57 (Reserve)	Medic Unit 57		Utility 57, ATV
