= Lucas Valley-Marinwood, California =

- Census-designated place
- Location in Marin County and the state of California
- Coordinates: 38°1′41″N 122°33′46″W
- Country: United States
- State: California
- County: Marin

Government
  - County Board: District 1 Mary Sackett
  - State Senator: Mike McGuire (D)
  - CA Assembly: Damon Connolly (D)
  - U. S. Rep.: Jared Huffman (D)

Area
  - Total: 5.731 sq mi (14.84 km^{2})
  - Land: 5.731 sq mi (14.84 km^{2})
  - Water: 0 sq mi (0 km^{2}) 0%
- Elevation: 620 ft (189 m)

Population (2020)
  - Total: 6,259
  - Density: 1,092/sq mi (421.7/km^{2})
- Time zone: UTC-8 (PST)
  - Summer (DST): UTC-7 (PDT)
- ZIP code: 94903 (San Rafael)
- Area codes: 415/628
- FIPS code: 06-44399
- GNIS feature ID: 2408149

Lucas Valley-Marinwood is a census-designated place (CDP) in Marin County, California, United States. It includes the neighborhoods of Lucas Valley and Marinwood. As of the 2020 census, the population was 6,259.

== History ==
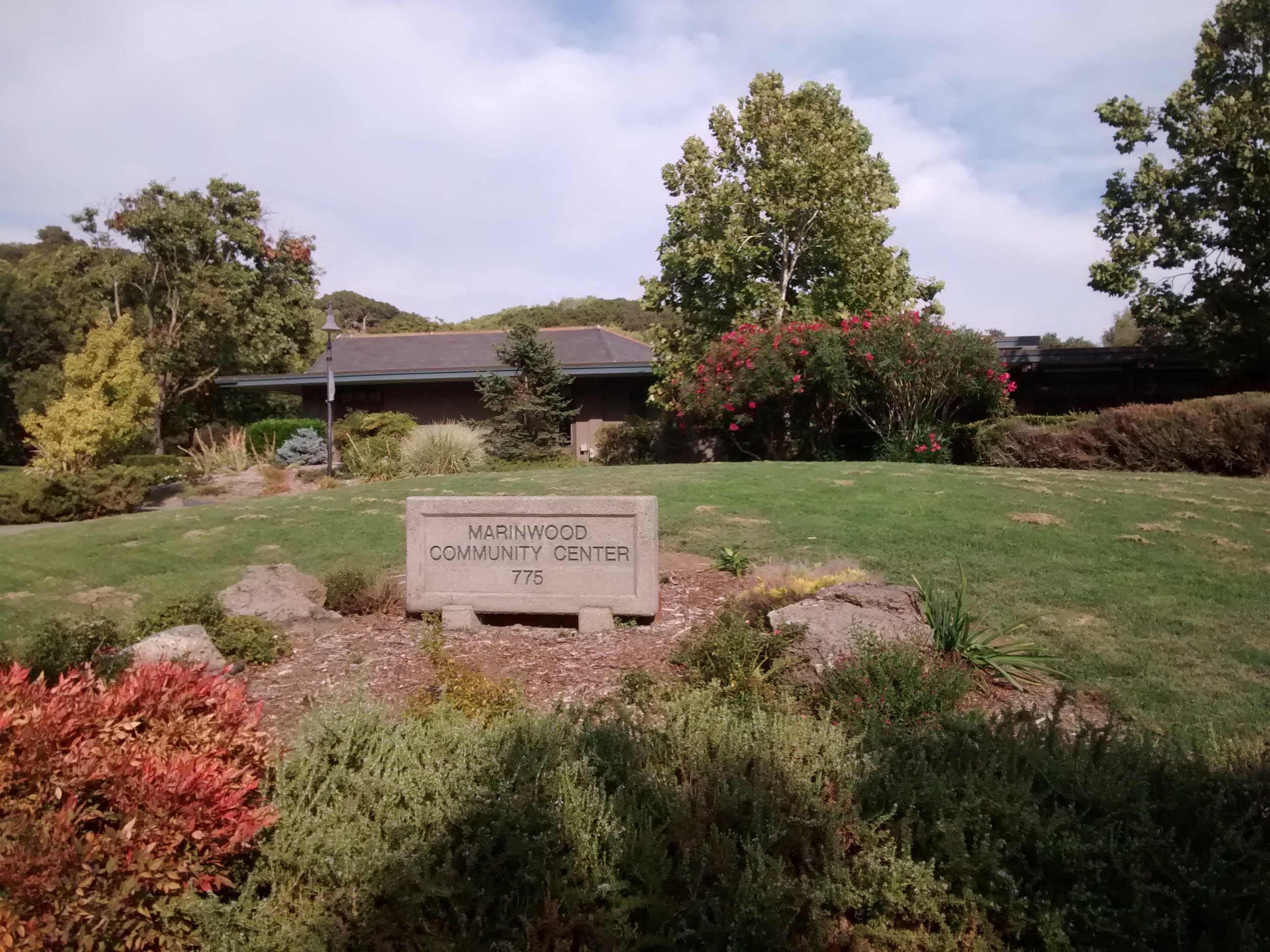
Marinwood Community Center

James Miller, of Irish descent, came overland to California in 1844 with the Stephens–Townsend–Murphy Party and in April 1845 arrived in San Rafael. In 1846 he purchased 680 acres (2.8 km^{2}) of land from Timothy Murphy, grantee of Rancho San Pedro, Santa Margarita y Las Gallinas. The land encompassed present-day Marinwood and a creek which was later named Miller Creek. He rebuilt an old adobe on a hill where the Miller Creek condominiums are located and called it Miller Hall. By 1862 Miller had 10 children, and in 1864 he donated a 3/4-acre site next to Miller Creek to have the Dixie School built upon it. The building still stands but has been relocated in front of Miller Creek Middle school on Las Gallinas Avenue. It is on the National Register of Historic Places.

James Miller died in 1890. The 1,084-acre (4.39 km^{2}) ranch he owned at the time was eventually sold to the Sequeira family in 1935. The family tore down Miller Hall later that year. A portion of the Miller land was sold to Anthony Faustine (A.F.) Silveira, who had leased the property from 1900 to 1935. Silveira built his own home and dairy facility in 1935 on the east side of what is now the 101 Highway. Silveira, the founding president of Marin Dairymen's Milk Co. Ltd. aka Marin-Dell, died in a ranch accident in 1937. His family continued the ranching operation, which still exists.

Lucas Valley was named after John Lucas, a 19th-century rancher and nephew of Timothy Murphy (not related to George Lucas).

In the 1950s and 1960s, suburbia came to Marinwood. It was brought partly on the shoulders of modernist builder/developer Joseph Eichler. His highly recognizable and stylish homes can be found throughout Lucas Valley and Eastern Marinwood. The Lucas Valley community center and pool were also constructed by Eichler as a centerpiece of the neighborhood.

The original subdivision of Marinwood consisted of streets to the north of Miller Creek Road and featured a blend of suburban single story ranch-style homes and two-story Cape Cod-inspired homes. The streets were named so that all the names ended in "-stone". In alphabetical order, they are Adobestone, Blackstone, Cobblestone, Deepstone, Emerystone, Flagstone, Heatherstone, Johnstone, Millstone, Opalstone, Peachstone, Rhinestone, Unionstone, and Windstone.

The second subdivision was smaller, built to the south of Miller Creek Road, featuring the same mix of ranch- and Cape Cod-style homes. The streets were named with "-wood" as their suffix. They are Pinewood and Quietwood.

A later development was the area that became known as Lower Lucas Valley. This development featured the Eichler-style homes, as opposed to the Marinwood mix. The streets of lower Lucas Valley were named so their names all ended in berry. The streets are, in alphabetical order: Appleberry, Blackberry, Cedarberry, Danberry, Elderberry, Flaxberry, Greenberry, Huckleberry, Idylberry, Juniperberry, Kernberry, Loganberry, Mulberry, Newberry.

The final development was the area up the valley to the west, known as Upper Lucas Valley, and also featured Eichler-style homes. The streets of this area are all named for famous mountains, such as Mt. Shasta, Mt. Rainier, Mt. Whitney, etc.

In 1977, George Lucas purchased 1,267 acres (5.13 km^{2}) west of Marinwood, which he subsequently refashioned into Skywalker Ranch. Geographically, Skywalker Ranch is located on the western side of the Big Rock Ridge and is not part of the Lucas Valley–Marinwood CDP.

== Geography ==
According to the United States Census Bureau, the CDP has a total area of 5.7 square miles (15 km^{2}), all land. It is bordered to the north by Novato and to the south by San Rafael. The U.S. Route 101 freeway forms the eastern boundary of the CDP, and Lucas Valley Road is the southern border. The CDP extends west up Lucas Valley road to the height of land at Big Rock.

== Demographics ==
Historical population
Census	Pop.	Note	%±
1980	6,409		—
1990	5,982		−6.7%
2000	6,357		6.3%
2010	6,094		−4.1%
2020	6,259		2.7%
U.S. Decennial Census; 1860–1870 1880-1890; 1900 1910 1920; 1930 1940 1950; 1960 1970 1980; 1990 2000 2010; 2020

Lucas Valley-Marinwood first appeared as a census designated place in the 1980 United States census.

=== Racial and ethnic composition ===
Lucas Valley-Marinwood CDP, California – Racial and ethnic composition Note: the US Census treats Hispanic/Latino as an ethnic category. This table excludes Latinos from the racial categories and assigns them to a separate category. Hispanics/Latinos may be of any race.
Race / Ethnicity (NH = Non-Hispanic)	Pop 2000	Pop 2010	Pop 2020	% 2000	% 2010	% 2020
White alone (NH)	5,464	4,936	4,650	85.95%	81.00%	74.29%
Black or African American alone (NH)	50	66	65	0.79%	1.08%	1.04%
Native American or Alaska Native alone (NH)	13	6	7	0.20%	0.10%	0.11%
Asian alone (NH)	376	422	477	5.91%	6.92%	7.62%
Native Hawaiian or Pacific Islander alone (NH)	6	5	15	0.09%	0.08%	0.24%
Other race alone (NH)	20	18	38	0.31%	0.30%	0.61%
Mixed race or Multiracial (NH)	161	197	417	2.53%	3.23%	6.66%
Hispanic or Latino (any race)	267	444	590	4.20%	7.29%	9.43%
Total	6,357	6,094	6,259	100.00%	100.00%	100.00%

=== 2020 census ===
As of the 2020 census, Lucas Valley-Marinwood had a population of 6,259. The population density was 1,092.1 inhabitants per square mile (421.7/km^{2}). The racial makeup of Lucas Valley-Marinwood was 76.4% White, 1.1% African American, 0.4% Native American, 7.7% Asian, 0.2% Pacific Islander, 3.6% from other races, and 10.5% from two or more races. Hispanic or Latino of any race were 9.4% of the population.

The census reported that 98.8% of the population lived in households, 1.0% lived in non-institutionalized group quarters, and 0.2% were institutionalized. 98.5% of residents lived in urban areas, while 1.5% lived in rural areas.

There were 2,392 households, out of which 32.9% included children under the age of 18, 61.2% were married-couple households, 4.2% were cohabiting couple households, 25.5% had a female householder with no partner present, and 9.1% had a male householder with no partner present. 22.0% of households were one person, and 16.4% were one person aged 65 or older. The average household size was 2.59. There were 1,746 families (73.0% of all households).

The age distribution was 21.9% under the age of 18, 5.7% aged 18 to 24, 16.9% aged 25 to 44, 30.3% aged 45 to 64, and 25.3% who were 65 years of age or older. The median age was 48.8 years. For every 100 females, there were 91.9 males, and for every 100 females age 18 and over there were 86.5 males age 18 and over.

There were 2,461 housing units at an average density of 429.4 units per square mile (165.8 units/km^{2}), of which 2,392 (97.2%) were occupied. Of occupied units, 81.8% were owner-occupied and 18.2% were occupied by renters. The homeowner vacancy rate was 0.7% and the rental vacancy rate was 2.7%.

=== Demographic estimates ===
In 2023, the US Census Bureau estimated that 14.3% of the population were foreign-born. Of all people aged 5 or older, 88.2% spoke only English at home, 3.9% spoke Spanish, 7.4% spoke other Indo-European languages, 0.4% spoke Asian or Pacific Islander languages, and 0.0% spoke other languages. Of those aged 25 or older, 97.3% were high school graduates and 69.4% had a bachelor's degree.

=== Income and poverty ===
The median household income in 2023 was $200,938, and the per capita income was $108,059. About 0.8% of families and 4.3% of the population were below the poverty line.

=== 2010 census ===
The 2010 United States census reported that Lucas Valley-Marinwood had a population of 6,094. The population density was 1,064.2 inhabitants per square mile (410.9/km^{2}). The racial makeup of Lucas Valley-Marinwood was 5,225 (85.7%) White, 68 (1.1%) African American, 18 (0.3%) Native American, 424 (7.0%) Asian, 5 (0.1%) Pacific Islander, 117 (1.9%) from other races, and 237 (3.9%) from two or more races. Hispanic or Latino of any race were 444 persons (7.3%).

The Census reported that 6,011 people (98.6% of the population) lived in households, 54 (0.9%) lived in non-institutionalized group quarters, and 29 (0.5%) were institutionalized.

There were 2,348 households, out of which 809 (34.5%) had children under the age of 18 living in them, 1,395 (59.4%) were opposite-sex married couples living together, 222 (9.5%) had a female householder with no husband present, 84 (3.6%) had a male householder with no wife present. There were 84 (3.6%) unmarried opposite-sex partnerships, and 35 (1.5%) same-sex married couples or partnerships. 521 households (22.2%) were made up of individuals, and 311 (13.2%) had someone living alone who was 65 years of age or older. The average household size was 2.56. There were 1,701 families (72.4% of all households); the average family size was 2.97.

The population was spread out, with 1,455 people (23.9%) under the age of 18, 309 people (5.1%) aged 18 to 24, 1,055 people (17.3%) aged 25 to 44, 2,052 people (33.7%) aged 45 to 64, and 1,223 people (20.1%) who were 65 years of age or older. The median age was 47.3 years. For every 100 females, there were 89.6 males. For every 100 females age 18 and over, there were 85.2 males.

There were 2,407 housing units at an average density of 420.3 per square mile (162.3/km^{2}), of which 2,002 (85.3%) were owner-occupied, and 346 (14.7%) were occupied by renters. The homeowner vacancy rate was 0.7%; the rental vacancy rate was 4.9%. 5,121 people (84.0% of the population) lived in owner-occupied housing units and 890 people (14.6%) lived in rental housing units.

== Education ==
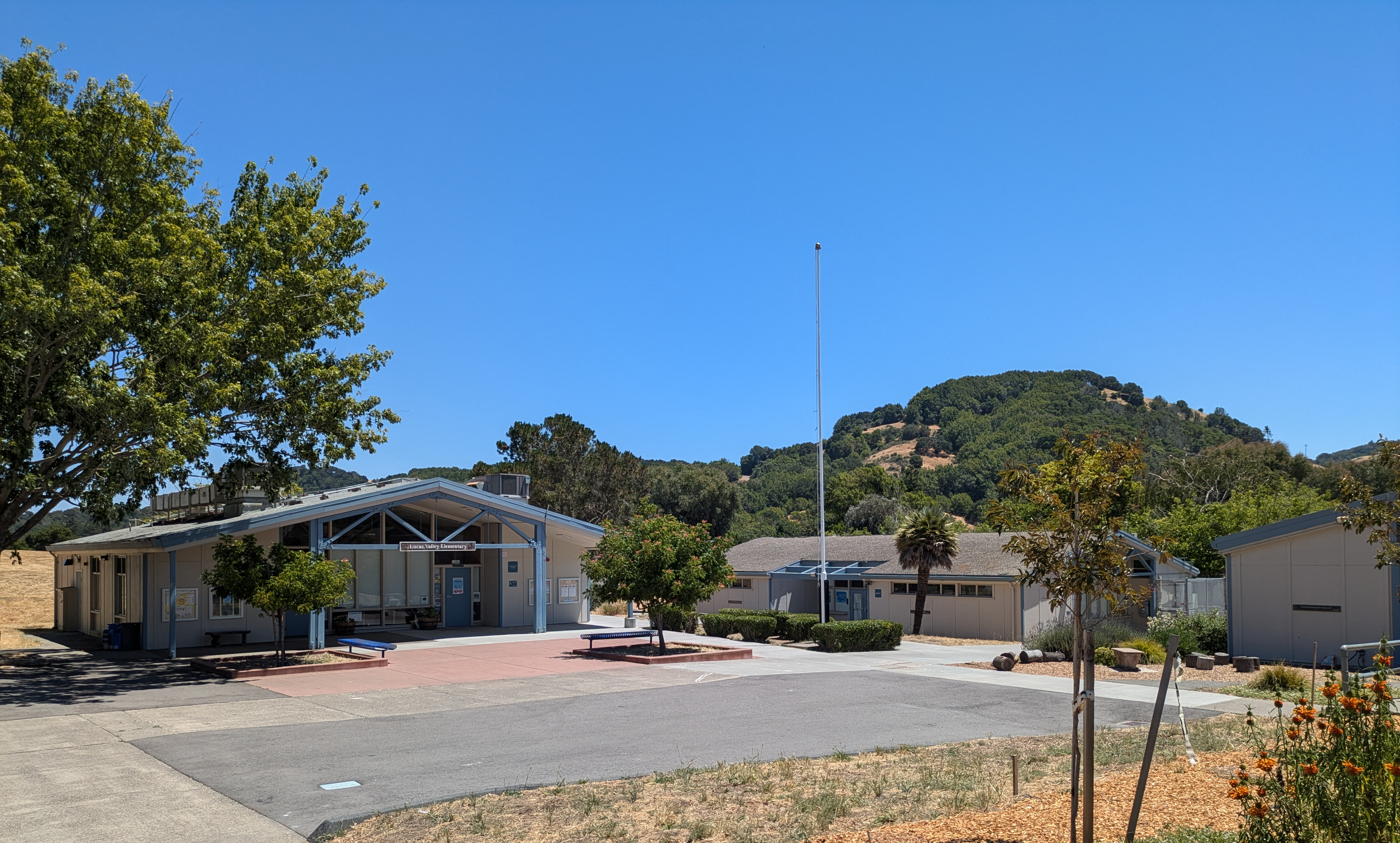
Lucas Valley Elementary School

The school districts covering the area of the CDP are the Miller Creek Elementary School District (formerly the Dixie School District) and the San Rafael City High School District.

It includes three elementary schools- Lucas Valley Elementary School, and Mary E. Silveira Elementary School. There is also one middle school-Miller Creek Middle School Panthers, a California Distinguished School.

Residents may choose either San Rafael High School or Terra Linda High School.

== See also ==
- Lucas Valley, the landform for which the community is named
