= Rancho San Pedro, Santa Margarita y Las Gallinas =

Mexican land grant in California

Coordinates: 38.040°N 122.600°W

Rancho San Pedro, Santa Margarita y Las Gallinas was a 21,679-acre (87.73 km^{2}) Mexican land grant in present-day Marin County, California given in 1844 by Governor Manuel Micheltorena to Timothy Murphy (Timoteo Murphy). Las Gallinas means "the hens" in Spanish. The grant extended from east of Nicasio, California, south-east along the Lucas Valley, California, then along Miller Creek to Las Gallinas and the San Pablo Bay.

== History ==
Timothy Murphy (1800–1853) born in County Wexford, Ireland, he worked at the Lima branch of the Hartnell and Company meatpacking house in 1828. He moved to Monterey, but the local branch of Hartnell and Company closed shortly after he arrived. In 1837, Murphy was administrator of Mission San Rafael, and later, served as alcalde and juez de paz at San Rafael. In 1844, Murphy was granted five square leagues in three adjoining ranchos: Rancho San Pedro, Rancho Santa Margarita and Rancho Las Gallinas. Timothy Murphy suffered a reversal of fortune in 1849 when he was swindled out of the proceeds from the sale of meat from his ranch, by John B. Steinberger. Thereafter, things continued to decline for him, until his death in 1853, of a burst appendix.

With the cession of California to the United States following the Mexican-American War, the 1848 Treaty of Guadalupe Hidalgo provided that the land grants would be honored. As required by the Land Act of 1851, a claim for Rancho San Pedro, Santa Margarita y Las Gallinas was filed with the Public Land Commission in 1852, and the grant was patented to Timothy Murphy in 1866.

Irishman, James S. Miller (1812–1890) and his wife, Mary Murphy (1815–1882) of the Murphy family, came overland to California in 1844 with the Stephens-Townsend-Murphy Party and in 1846 he purchased 680 acres (2.8 km^{2}) of the Rancho Las Gallinas purchased from Timothy Murphy (Timoteo Murphy) and operated it as a beef ranch and then as a dairy farm. Miller and Miller Creek are named for James S. Miller.

Timothy Murphy never married, and when he died in 1853, his brother Matthew Murphy (who was shot while riding near San Quentin by a prison guard in 1852, and died in 1854) inherited present day McNear, Peacock Gap, and China Camp. His nephew, John Lucas, inherited the 7,600-acre (31 km^{2}) Santa Margarita ranch (present-day Lucas Valley-Marinwood, California and Terra Linda). John Lucas (1826–) was born in County Wexford, Ireland, and came to California in 1852. He returned to Ireland in 1853, but came back to California in 1855. He married Maria Sweetman in 1855, and in 1856 moved to the ranch opposite the James Miller, where he built a home, and continued grazing cattle. He sold about 1,200 acres (4.9 km^{2}) of Rancho Santa Margarita to Manuel T. Freitas (1853–1923) in 1898.

== Historic sites of the Rancho ==
- Dixie Schoolhouse, a one-story, wood-frame Italianate schoolhouse built in 1864.

== See also ==
- Ranchos of Marin County, California
- Ranchos of California
- List of Ranchos of California
