= San Rafael, California =

City in California, United States

San Rafael
- City
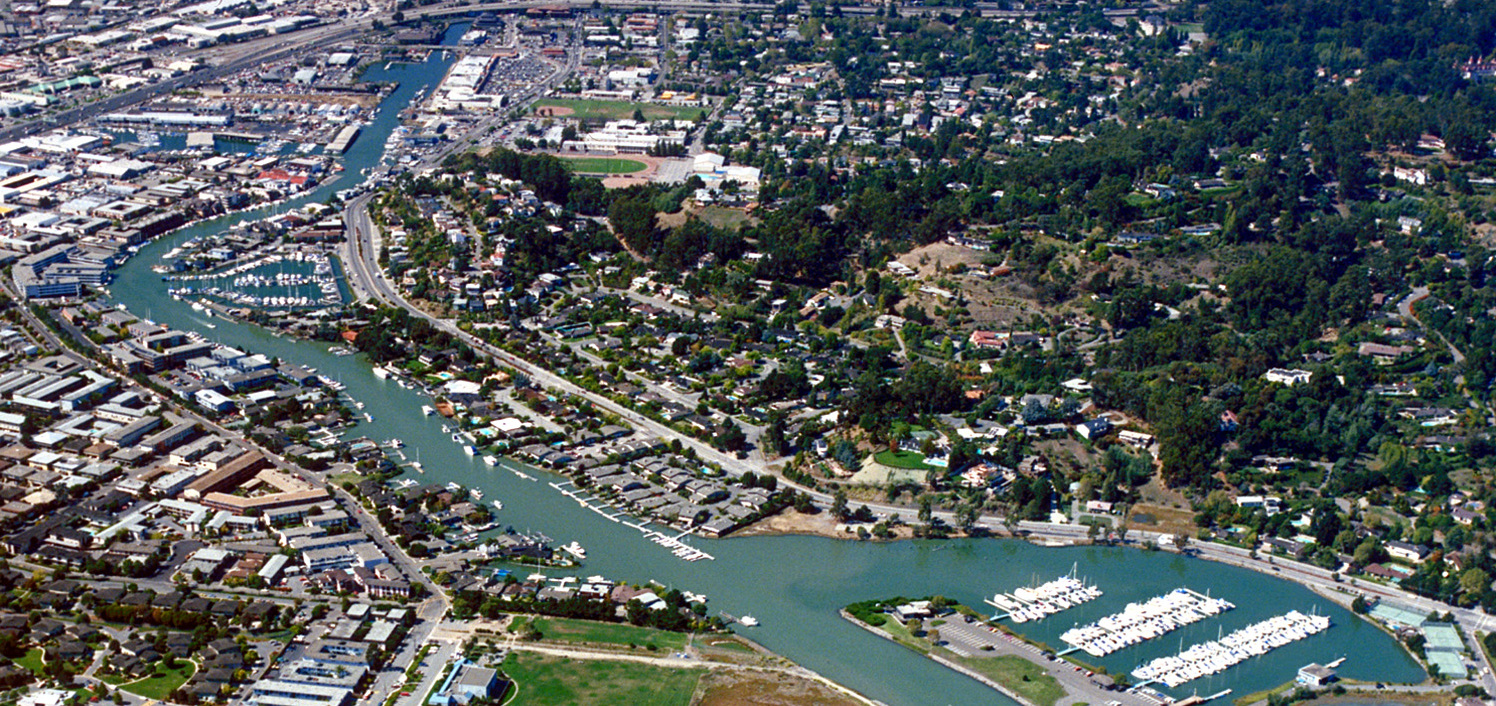
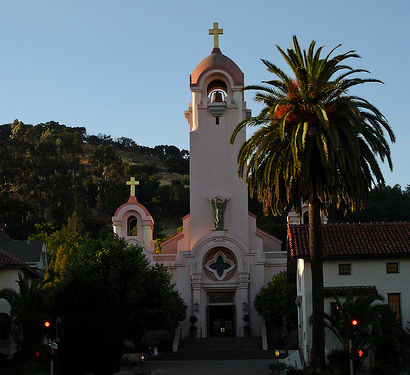
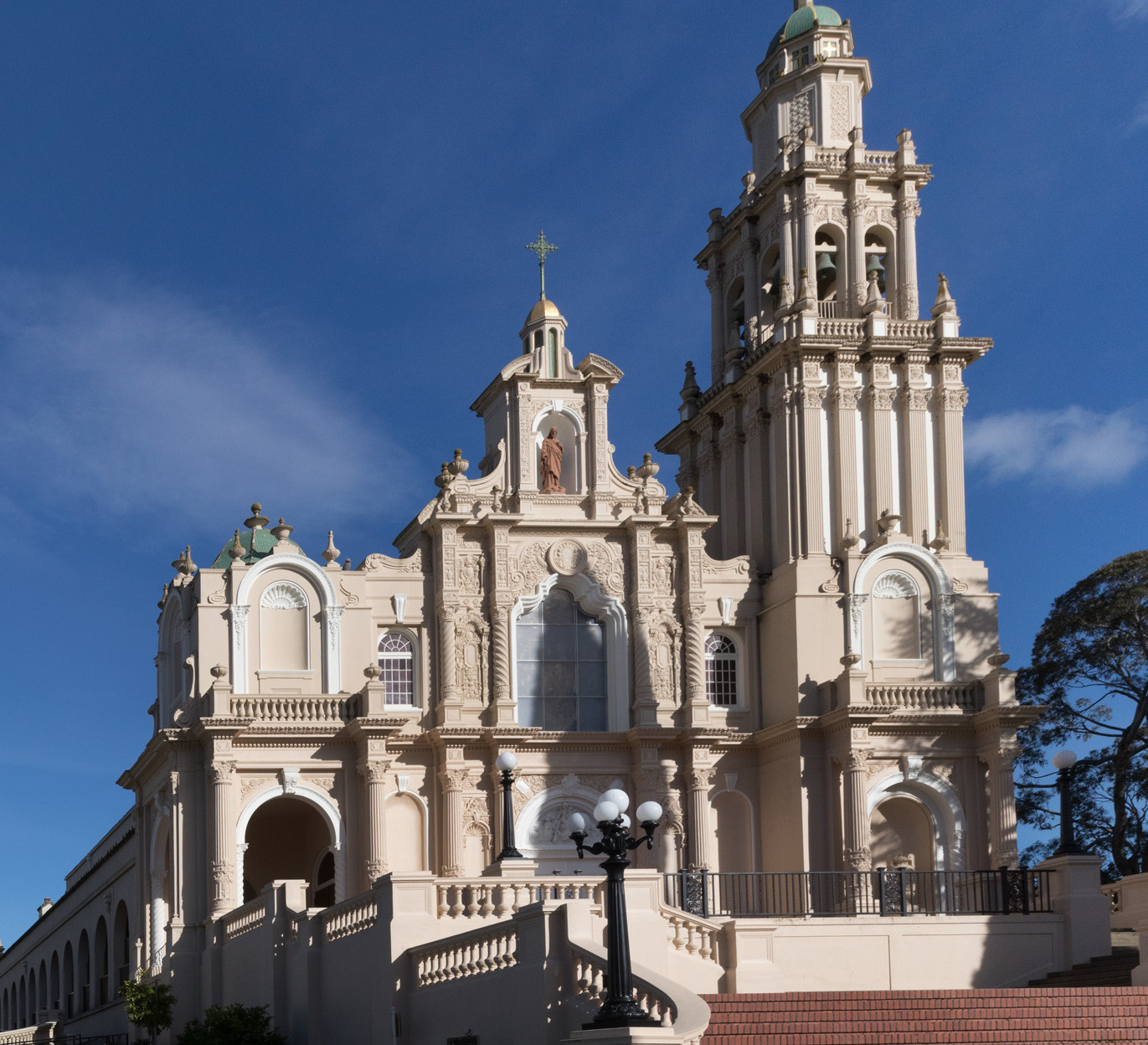
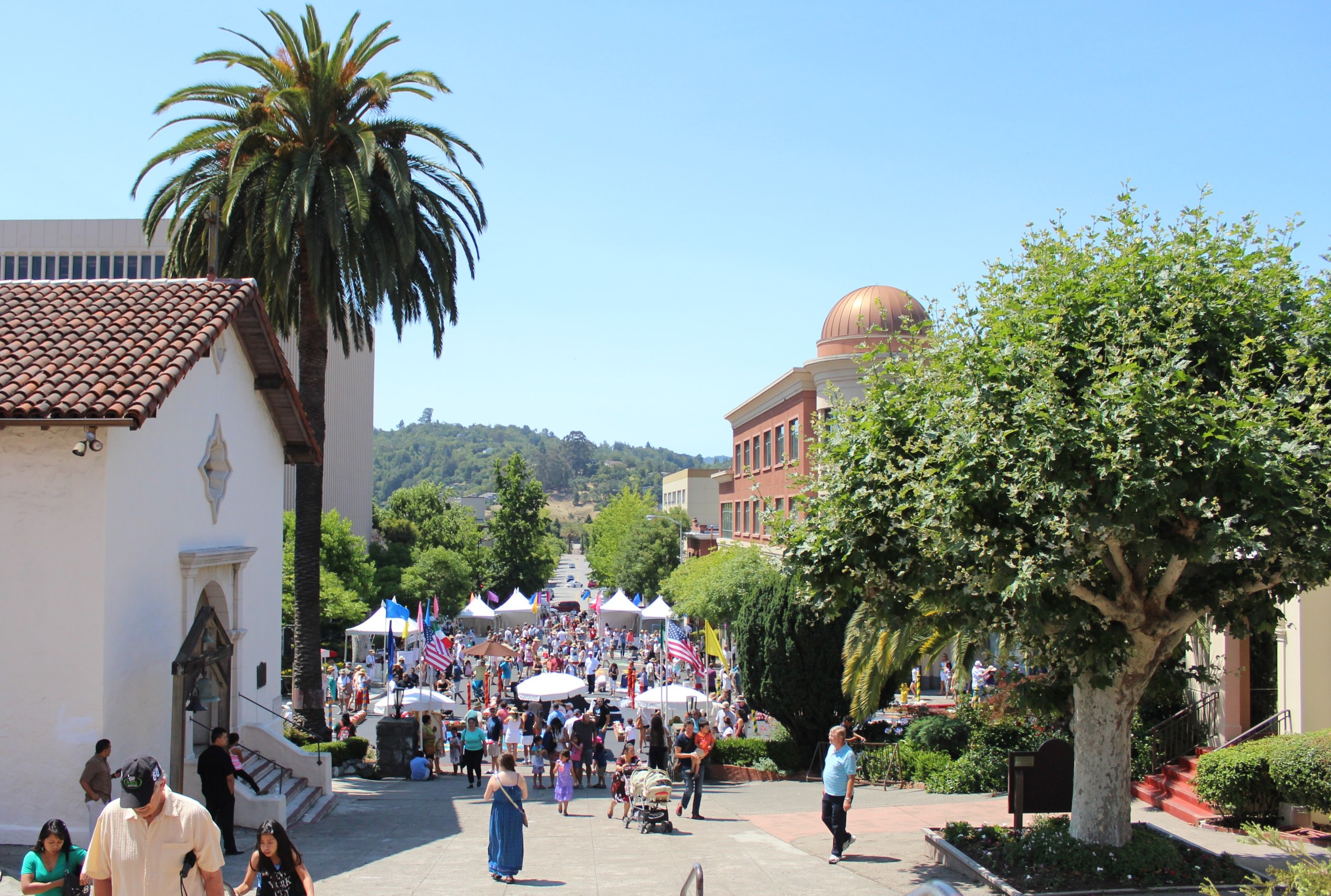
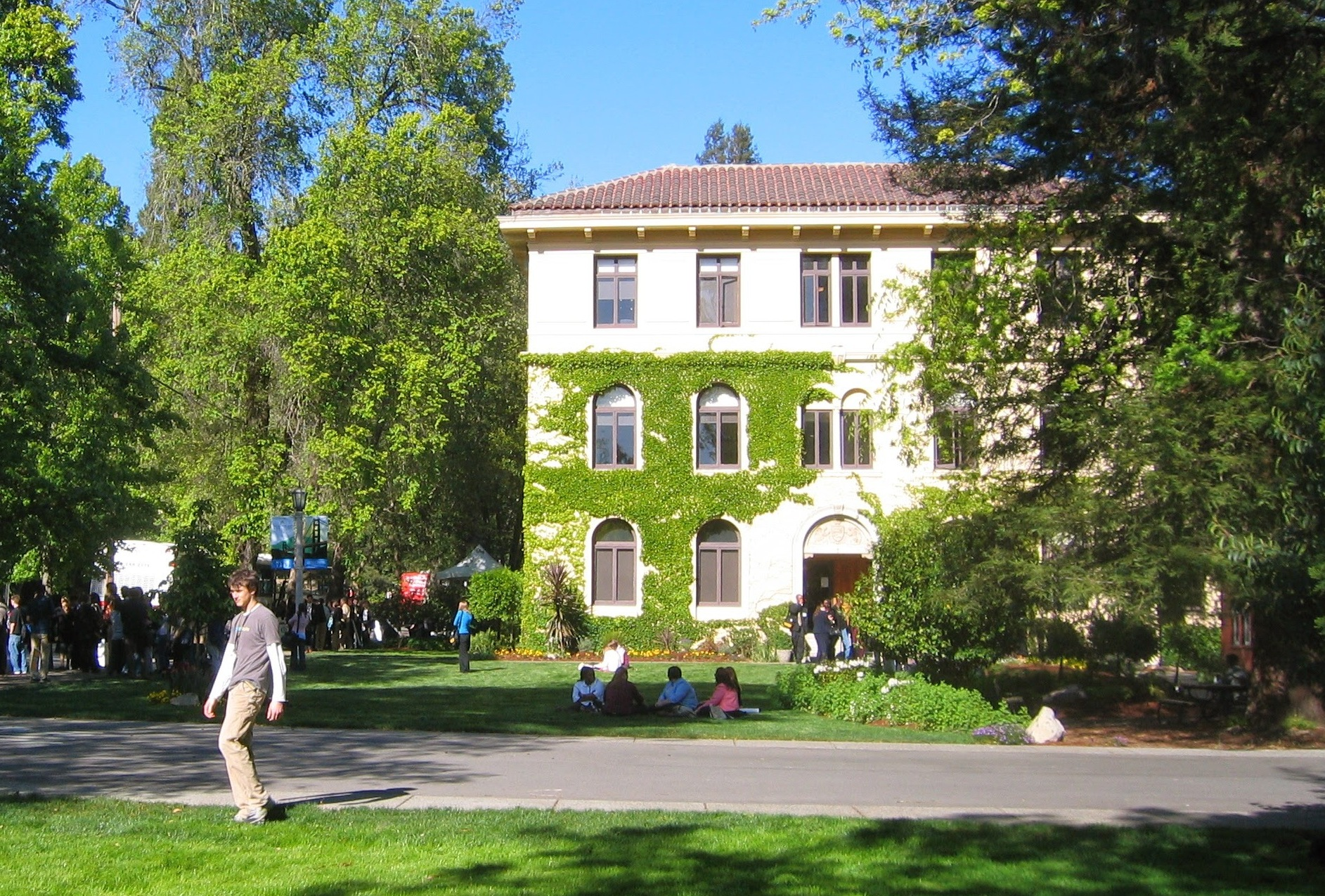
- Aerial view Mission San Rafael Arcángel St. Vincent's School for Boys Downtown San Rafael Dominican University of California

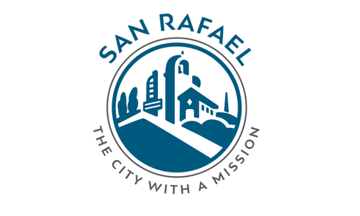
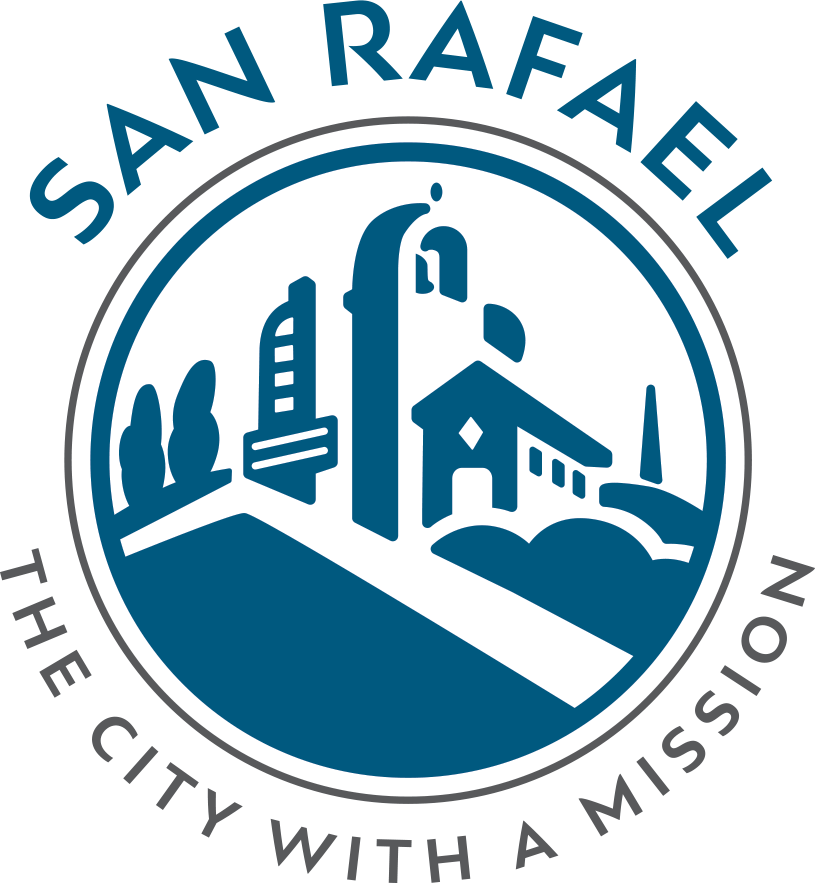
- Flag Seal
- Nickname: The City With a Mission
- Interactive map of San Rafael
- Location in the United States San Rafael (California) San Rafael (the United States)
- Coordinates: 37°58′25″N 122°31′52″W
- Country: United States
- State: California
- County: Marin
- Incorporated: February 18, 1874
- Named for: Archangel Raphael

Government
  - Type: Council-manager with directly elected mayor
  - Mayor: Kate Colin
  - City Manager: Paul Navazio
  - County Supervisors: District 1: Mary Sackett District 2: Brian Colbert District 4: Dennis Rodoni
  - State Legislators: Sen. Mike McGuire (D); Asm. Damon Connolly (D)
  - U. S. Rep.: Jared Huffman (D)

Area
  - City: 22.54 sq mi (58.4 km^{2})
  - Land: 16.59 sq mi (43.0 km^{2})
  - Water: 5.96 sq mi (15.4 km^{2}) 26.42%
- Elevation: 43 ft (13 m)

Population (2020)
  - City: 61,271
  - Density: 3,693.92/sq mi (1,426.23/km^{2})
  - Urban: 246,548 (US: 165th)
  - Urban density: 2,897.2/sq mi (1,118.6/km^{2})
  - Demonym: San Rafaelino
- Time zone: UTC−8 (PST)
  - Summer (DST): UTC−7 (PDT)
- ZIP code: 94901
- Area codes: 415/628
- FIPS code: 06-68364
- GNIS feature IDs: 1659589, 2411804
- Website: sanrafael.gov

San Rafael (/ˌsæn rəˈfɛl/ SAN rə-FEL; Spanish for "St. Raphael", Spanish pronunciation: [san rafaˈel]) is a city in and the county seat of Marin County, California, United States. The city is located in the North Bay region of the San Francisco Bay Area. As of the 2020 census, San Rafael had a population of 61,271.

San Rafael was founded by the Spanish in 1817, when Vicente Francisco de Sarría established Mission San Rafael Arcángel, initially as an asistencia (sub-mission). San Rafael Arcángel was upgraded to full mission status in 1822, a month before Alta California declared independence from Spain as part of Mexico. Following the American Conquest of California, the community of San Rafael incorporated as a city in 1874.

== History ==
San Rafael was once the site of several Coast Miwok villages: Awani-wi, near downtown San Rafael; Ewu, near Terra Linda; and Shotomko-cha, in Marinwood.

=== Spanish period ===
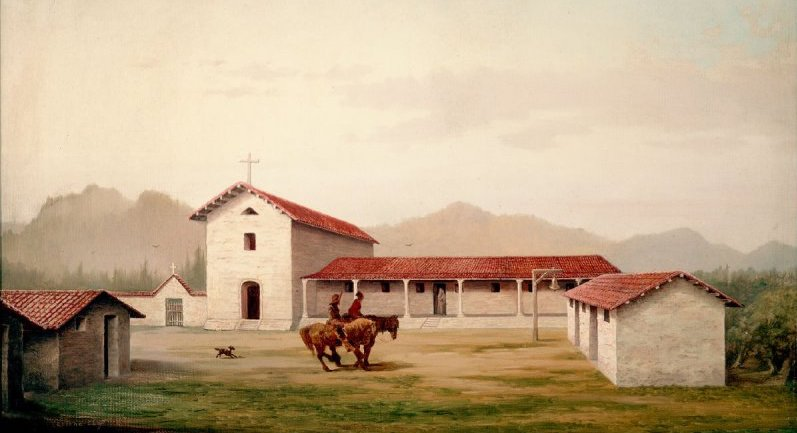
San Rafael was founded in 1817, when Mission San Rafael Arcángel was established by Vicente Sarría.

Mission San Rafael Arcángel was founded as the 20th Spanish mission in the colonial province of Alta California by three priests—Father Narciso Durán from Mission San José, Father Abella from Mission San Francisco de Asís, Father Luis Gíl y Taboada from La Iglesia de Nuestra Señora Reina de los Angeles—on December 14, 1817, four years before Mexico gained independence from Spain. The mission from which the downtown grew and the city being named after the Archangel Raphael, the Angel of Healing.

The mission was originally planned as a hospital site for Central Valley American Indians who had become ill at the cold San Francisco Mission Dolores. Father Luis Gil, who spoke several Native American languages, was put in charge of the facility. In part because of its ideal weather, San Rafael was later upgraded to full mission status in 1822.

=== Mexican period ===
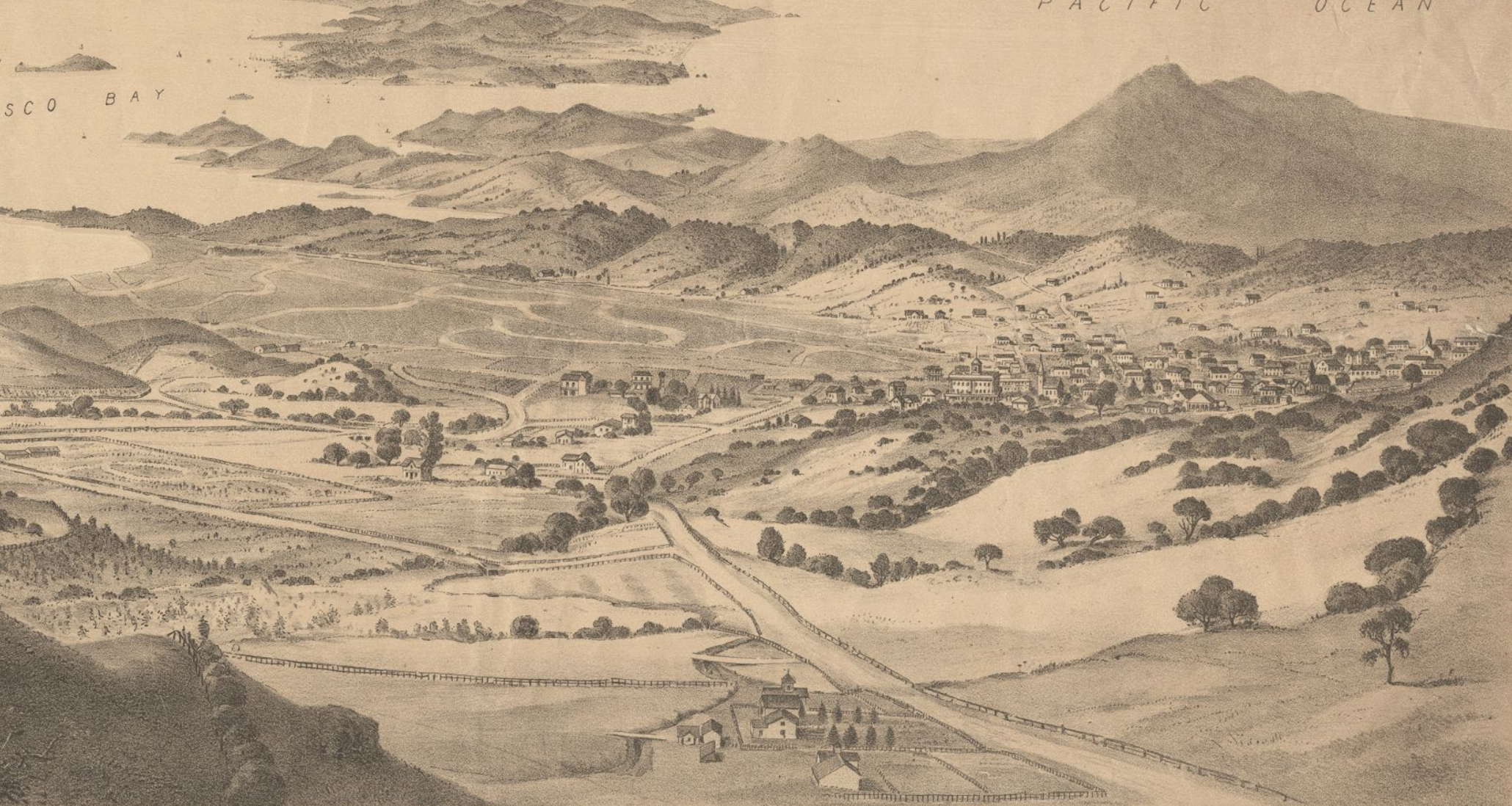
San Rafael in the late 19th century

The mission had 300 converts within its first year, and 1,140 converts by 1828.

Following the Mexican secularization act of 1833, the Mexican government took over the California missions in 1834, and Mission San Rafael was abandoned in 1844, eventually falling into ruin.

=== American period ===
San Rafael has been the seat of Marin County since April 25, 1851. The San Francisco and North Pacific Railroad reached San Rafael in 1879 and was linked to the national rail network in 1888. The United States Navy operated a San Pablo Bay degaussing range from San Rafael through World War II.

== Geography ==
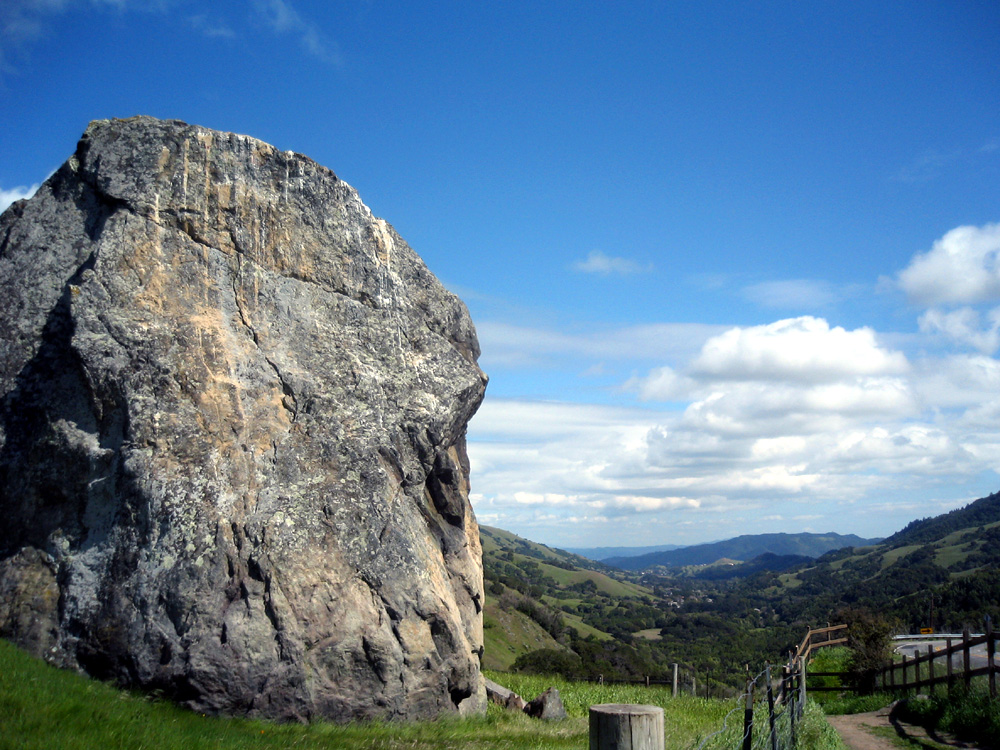
Big Rock Ridge

According to the United States Census Bureau, the city has a total area of 22.5 square miles (58 km^{2}), of which 16.6 square miles (43 km^{2}) is land and 6.0 square miles (16 km^{2}) (26.42%) is water. San Francisco is 16 miles (26 km) to the south.

The San Rafael shoreline has been historically filled to a considerable extent to accommodate land development, with underlying bay mud (saturated clayed silt) of up to 90 feet (27 m) in thickness. At certain locations such as Murphys Point, the sandstone or shale rock outcrops through the mud.

San Rafael has a wide diversity of natural habitats, from forests at the higher elevations to marshland and estuarine settings. Its marshes are home to the endangered species salt marsh harvest mouse. There are also riparian areas including the San Rafael Creek and Miller Creek corridors.

=== Climate ===
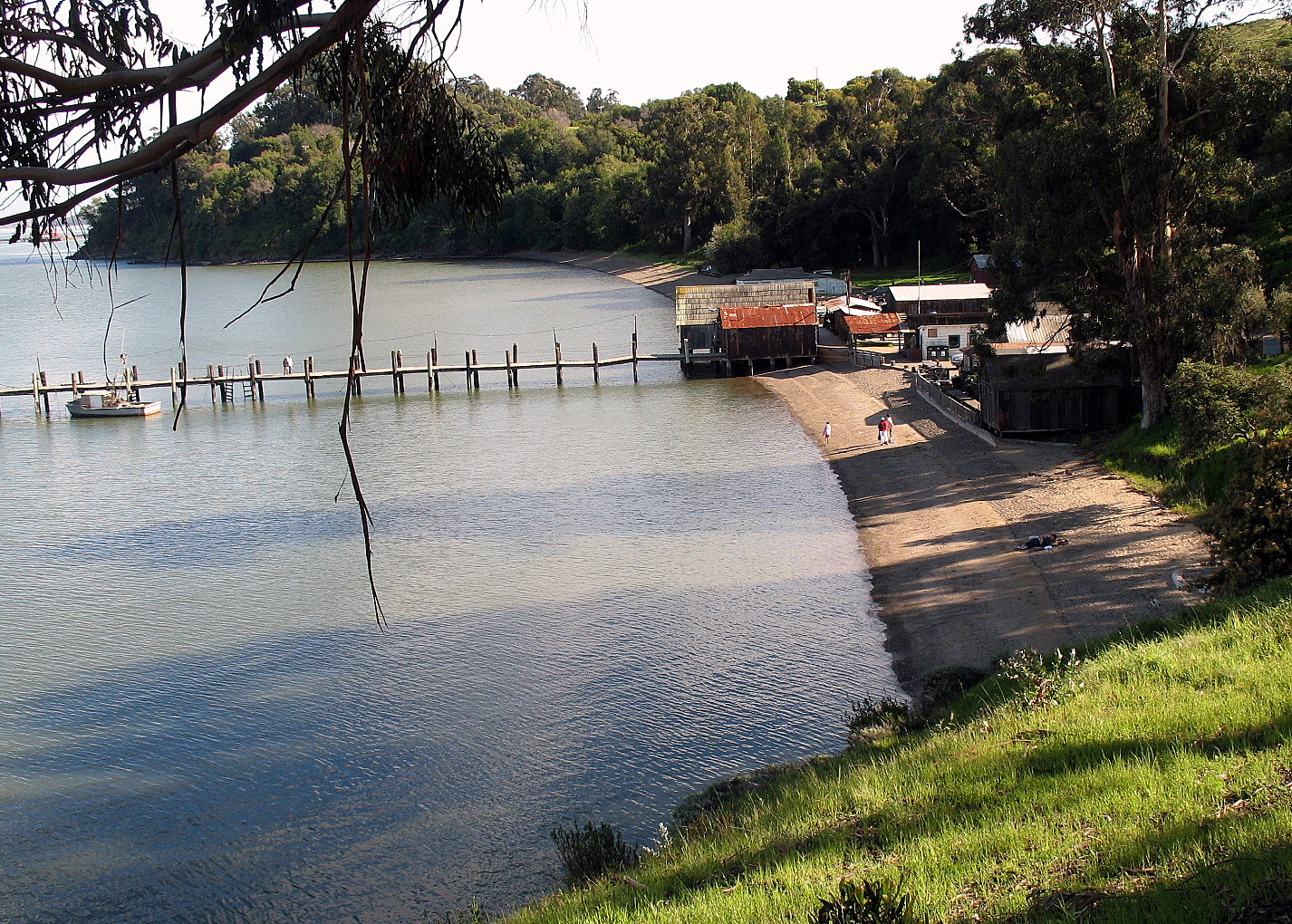
China Camp State Park

San Rafael has a warm-summer Mediterranean climate (Köppen climate classification: Csb), with mild winter lows seldom reaching the freezing mark. The National Weather Service reports that August is usually the warmest month with a high of 80.1 °F (26.7 °C) and a low of 55.0 °F (12.8 °C). December, the coldest month, has an average high of 55.1 °F (12.8 °C) and an average low of 41.0 °F (5.0 °C). The highest temperature on record is 110 °F (43.3 °C), recorded in June 1961. The highest temperature in recent years, 108 °F (42.2 °C), occurred on July 23, 2006, and 108 °F (42.2 °C) again on September 6, 2020. The record lowest temperature was 20 °F (−6.7 °C) on December 22, 1990. There are an average of 17.9 afternoons annually with a high of 90 °F (32.2 °C) or more and 1.2 afternoons with a high of 100 °F (37.8 °C) or more. Freezing temperatures (32 °F/0 °C or below) occur on an average of 3.6 mornings.

Total annual precipitation averages 32.16 inches (816.9 mm), with an average of 64.3 days with measurable rain. The rainy season is from November to early April: rain is rare outside of this period and it is normal to receive no rain in June, July, August, and September. The wettest "rain year" was from July 1994 to June 1995 with 61.45 inches (1,560.8 mm) and the driest from July 1975 to June 1976 with 13.62 inches (345.9 mm). The most rain in one month was 24.11 inches (612.4 mm) in January 1995, and the heaviest 24-hour rainfall was 8.74 inches (222.0 mm) on December 11, 1995. A trace of snow was recorded on January 30, 1976.

Climate data for San Rafael Civic Center (1991–2020 normals, extremes 1895–present)
Month	Jan	Feb	Mar	Apr	May	Jun	Jul	Aug	Sep	Oct	Nov	Dec	Year
Record high °F (°C)	82 (28)	83 (28)	88 (31)	92 (33)	100 (38)	110 (43)	109 (43)	105 (41)	110 (43)	106 (41)	88 (31)	79 (26)	110 (43)
Mean maximum °F (°C)	65.1 (18.4)	71.5 (21.9)	77.1 (25.1)	84.0 (28.9)	88.4 (31.3)	96.6 (35.9)	96.8 (36.0)	95.6 (35.3)	94.6 (34.8)	88.3 (31.3)	75.1 (23.9)	65.7 (18.7)	100.6 (38.1)
Mean daily maximum °F (°C)	56.9 (13.8)	61.1 (16.2)	64.8 (18.2)	67.8 (19.9)	72.0 (22.2)	77.9 (25.5)	80.9 (27.2)	81.3 (27.4)	80.7 (27.1)	74.9 (23.8)	64.6 (18.1)	57.1 (13.9)	70.0 (21.1)
Daily mean °F (°C)	49.8 (9.9)	52.5 (11.4)	55.2 (12.9)	57.7 (14.3)	61.3 (16.3)	65.7 (18.7)	67.9 (19.9)	68.4 (20.2)	67.6 (19.8)	63.2 (17.3)	55.3 (12.9)	49.6 (9.8)	59.5 (15.3)
Mean daily minimum °F (°C)	42.6 (5.9)	44.0 (6.7)	45.5 (7.5)	47.5 (8.6)	50.6 (10.3)	53.5 (11.9)	54.9 (12.7)	55.5 (13.1)	54.4 (12.4)	51.4 (10.8)	46.0 (7.8)	42.1 (5.6)	49.0 (9.4)
Mean minimum °F (°C)	33.8 (1.0)	34.6 (1.4)	37.2 (2.9)	39.8 (4.3)	44.1 (6.7)	47.0 (8.3)	50.4 (10.2)	50.1 (10.1)	47.9 (8.8)	44.3 (6.8)	37.4 (3.0)	33.1 (0.6)	30.4 (−0.9)
Record low °F (°C)	23 (−5)	21 (−6)	24 (−4)	29 (−2)	27 (−3)	31 (−1)	34 (1)	41 (5)	36 (2)	34 (1)	30 (−1)	20 (−7)	20 (−7)
Average precipitation inches (mm)	7.13 (181)	6.94 (176)	4.42 (112)	1.99 (51)	0.94 (24)	0.15 (3.8)	0.00 (0.00)	0.05 (1.3)	0.07 (1.8)	1.46 (37)	3.49 (89)	7.81 (198)	34.45 (875)
Average precipitation days (≥ 0.01 in)	12.5	11.1	10.2	6.3	3.1	1.3	0.1	0.1	0.7	3.9	7.4	11.8	68.5
Source: NOAA

== Demographics ==
Historical population
Census	Pop.	Note	%±
1870	841		—
1880	2,276		170.6%
1890	3,290		44.6%
1900	3,879		17.9%
1910	5,934		53.0%
1920	5,512		−7.1%
1930	8,022		45.5%
1940	8,573		6.9%
1950	13,848		61.5%
1960	20,460		47.7%
1970	38,977		90.5%
1980	44,700		14.7%
1990	48,404		8.3%
2000	56,063		15.8%
2010	57,713		2.9%
2020	61,271		6.2%
2025 (est.)	59,410	▼	−3.0%
U.S. Decennial Census; 1860–1870 1880-1890; 1900 1910 1920; 1930 1940 1950; 1960 1970 1980; 1990 2000 2010; 2020

San Rafael first appeared as a city in the 1870 United States census.

=== 2020 census ===
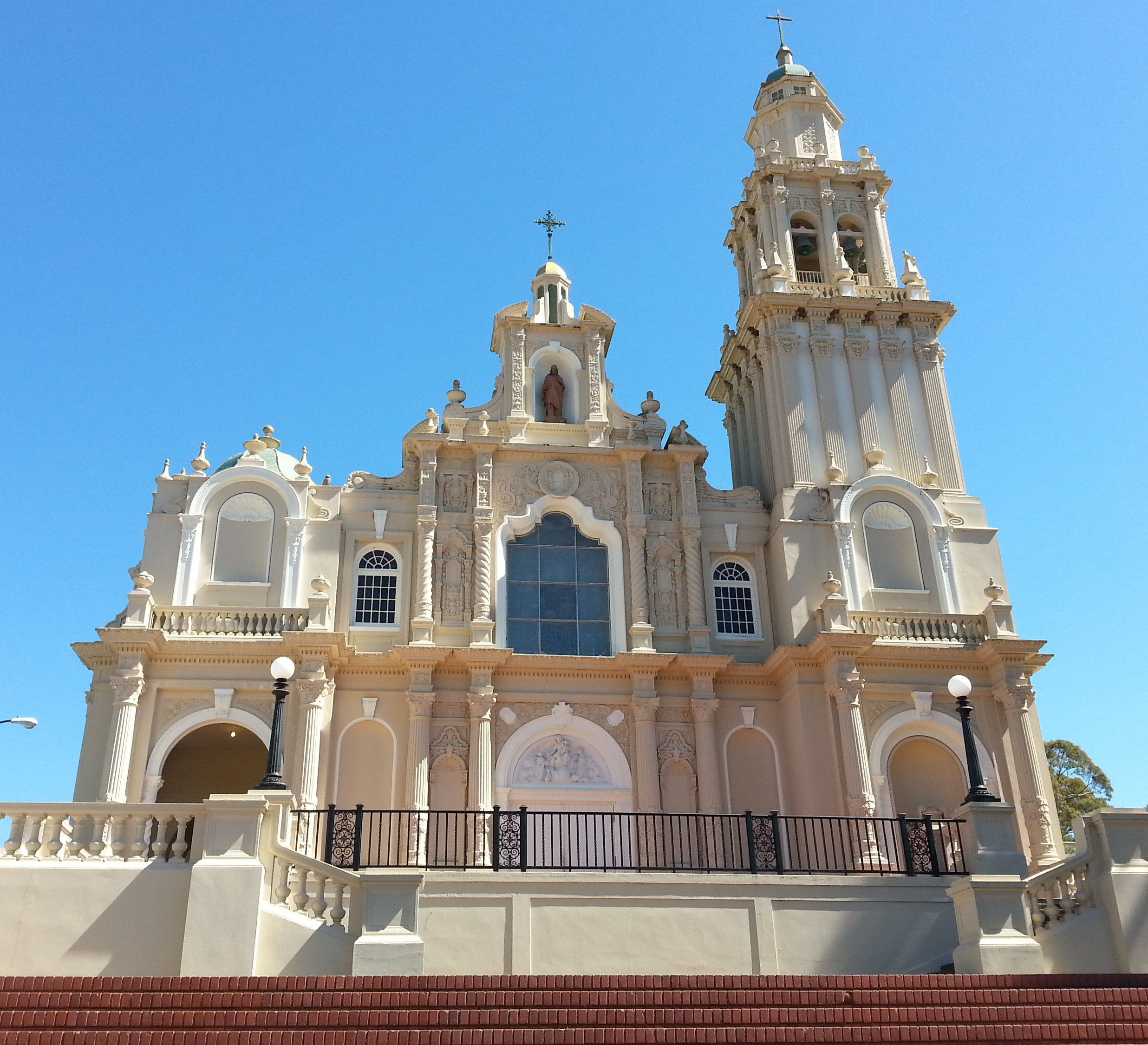
St. Vincent's School for Boys

As of the 2020 census, San Rafael had a population of 61,271 and a population density of 3,693.9 inhabitants per square mile (1,426.2/km^{2}). The median age was 41.3 years. The age distribution was 20.5% under the age of 18, 8.1% aged 18 to 24, 26.3% aged 25 to 44, 25.3% aged 45 to 64, and 19.7% who were 65 years of age or older. For every 100 females, there were 98.6 males, and for every 100 females age 18 and over, there were 96.0 males age 18 and over.

The census reported that 97.1% of the population lived in households, 1.9% lived in non-institutionalized group quarters, and 1.0% were institutionalized. A total of 99.9% of residents lived in urban areas, while 0.1% lived in rural areas.

There were 23,339 households in San Rafael, of which 30.2% had children under the age of 18 living in them. Of all households, 45.4% were married-couple households, 7.5% were cohabiting-couple households, 18.6% were households with a male householder and no spouse or partner present, and 28.5% were households with a female householder and no spouse or partner present. About 30.3% of households were one person households, and 15.9% had one person aged 65 or older. The average household size was 2.55. There were 14,209 families (60.9% of all households).

There were 24,502 housing units at an average density of 1,477.2 units per square mile (570.4 units/km^{2}). Of these, 23,339 units (95.3%) were occupied and 4.7% were vacant. Of occupied units, 50.8% were owner-occupied and 49.2% were occupied by renters. The homeowner vacancy rate was 0.9%, and the rental vacancy rate was 4.2%.

Racial composition as of the 2020 census
Race	Number	Percent
White	33,427	54.6%
Black or African American	1,065	1.7%
American Indian and Alaska Native	2,246	3.7%
Asian	4,073	6.6%
Native Hawaiian and Other Pacific Islander	156	0.3%
Some other race	12,721	20.8%
Two or more races	7,583	12.4%
Hispanic or Latino (of any race)	21,038	34.3%

=== 2023 ACS estimates ===
In 2023, the US Census Bureau estimated that the median household income was $109,317, and the per capita income was $67,609. About 5.5% of families and 10.9% of the population were below the poverty line.

=== 2010 census ===
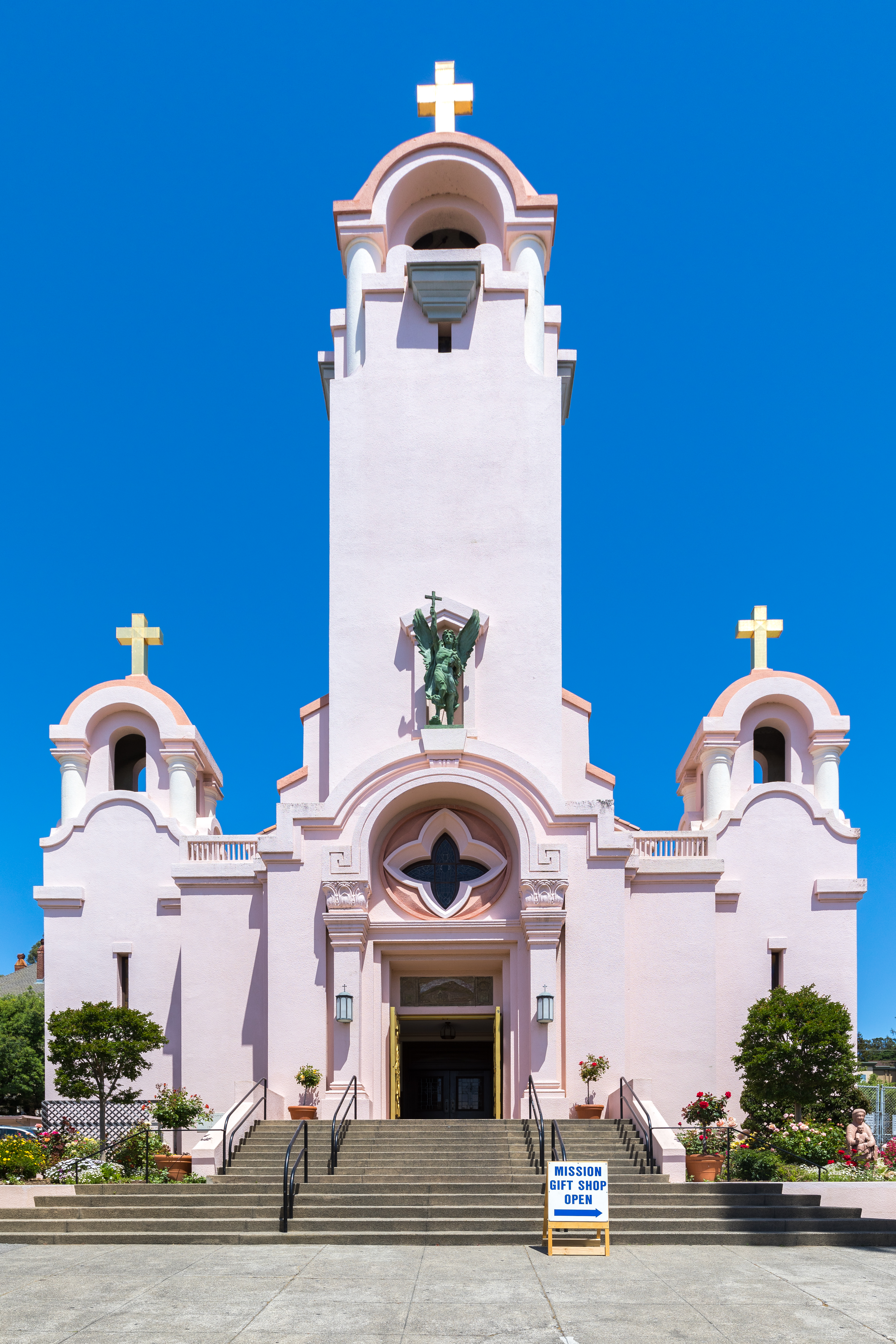
San Rafael Church

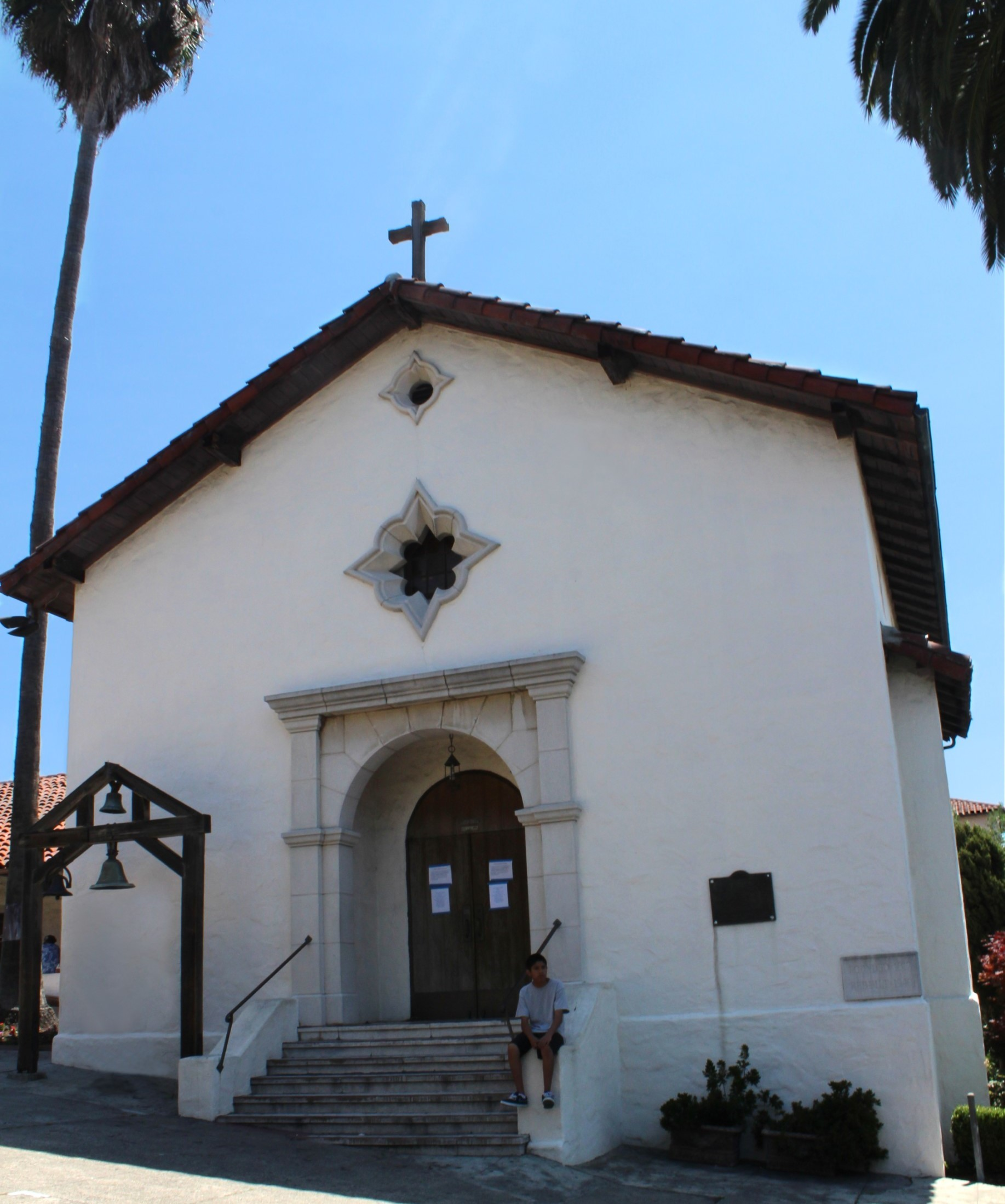
Mission San Rafael Arcángel

The 2010 United States census reported that the city of San Rafael had a population of 57,713. This figure does not, however, include portions of the Santa Venetia and Lucas Valley-Marinwood CDPs, nor various other unincorporated areas, all of which have San Rafael postal addresses; in total, according to the 2010 Census, there were 70,197 residents of San Rafael postal addresses (ZIP codes 94901 and 94903).

The following statistics refer to the incorporated limits of San Rafael only. The population density was 2,573.9 inhabitants per square mile (993.8/km^{2}). The racial makeup of San Rafael was 40,734 (70.6%) White, 1,154 (2.0%) African American, 709 (1.2%) Native American, 3,513 (6.1%) Asian, 126 (0.2%) Pacific Islander, 8,513 (14.8%) from other races, and 2,964 (5.1%) from two or more races. Hispanic or Latino of any race were 17,302 persons (30.0%).

The Census reported that 55,594 people (96.3% of the population) lived in households, 1,314 (2.3%) lived in non-institutionalized group quarters, and 805 (1.4%) were institutionalized.

There were 22,764 households, out of which 6,358 (27.9%) had children under the age of 18 living in them, 9,845 (43.2%) were opposite-sex married couples living together, 2,004 (8.8%) had a female householder with no husband present, 1,133 (5.0%) had a male householder with no wife present. There were 1,450 (6.4%) unmarried opposite-sex partnerships, and 301 (1.3%) same-sex married couples or partnerships. 7,434 households (32.7%) were made up of individuals, and 2,954 (13.0%) had someone living alone who was 65 years of age or older. The average household size was 2.44. There were 12,982 families (57.0% of all households); the average family size was 3.02.

The population was spread out, with 11,132 people (19.3%) under the age of 18, 4,956 people (8.6%) aged 18 to 24, 16,915 people (29.3%) aged 25 to 44, 15,574 people (27.0%) aged 45 to 64, and 9,136 people (15.8%) who were 65 years of age or older. The median age was 40.2 years. For every 100 females, there were 99.7 males. For every 100 females age 18 and over, there were 98.1 males.

There were 24,011 housing units at an average density of 1,070.9 units per square mile (413.5 units/km^{2}), of which 11,909 (52.3%) were owner-occupied, and 10,855 (47.7%) were occupied by renters. The homeowner vacancy rate was 1.6%; the rental vacancy rate was 5.1%. 27,554 people (47.7% of the population) lived in owner-occupied housing units and 28,040 people (48.6%) lived in rental housing units.

== Economy ==
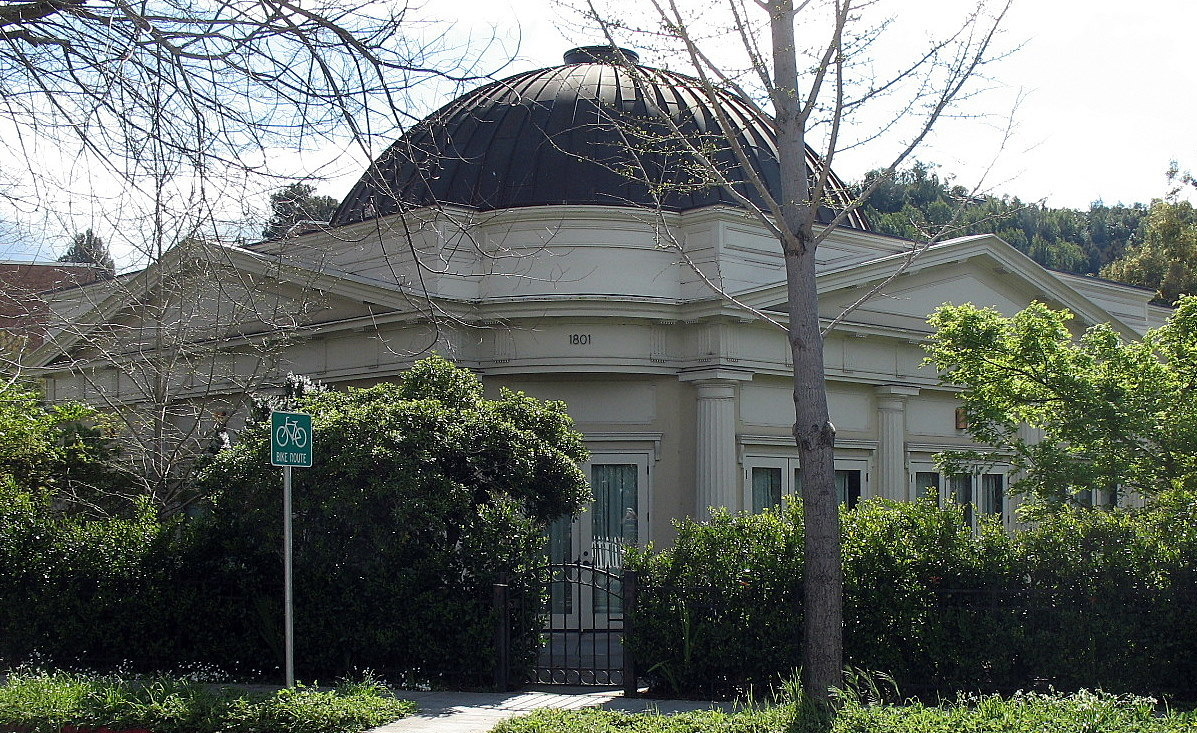
Historic San Rafael Improvement Club, one of only two surviving buildings from the 1915 Panama–Pacific International Exposition

BioMarin, Autodesk, In Defense of Animals, Westamerica Bank, and GIS Data Resources are among the companies headquartered in San Rafael. In May 2022, Autodesk announced its intention to move its headquarters to San Francisco, along with its 578 employees, and close the San Rafael office by October of that year.

=== Housing ===
San Rafael, a small city situated in Marin County, is known for its affluent suburban/urban environment. Despite the median income for a family in San Rafael reaching an estimated amount of $97,009 according to the 2016-2020 US Census report, different regions of San Rafael remain below the poverty line of 11.4%.

=== Top employers ===
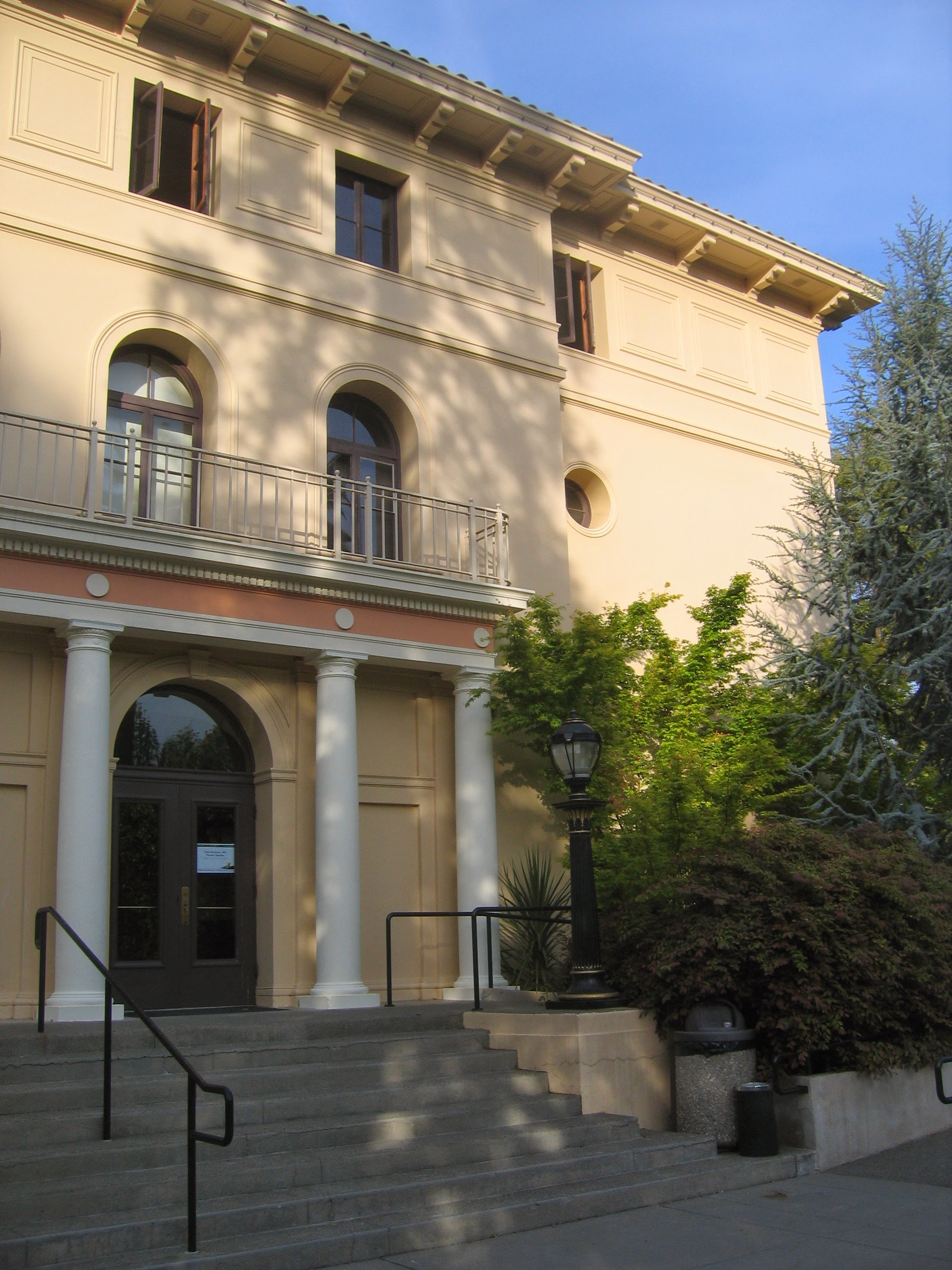
Dominican University of California

According to San Rafael's 2023 Annual Comprehensive Financial Report, the top employers in the city are:

#	Employer	# of Employees
1	Kaiser Permanente	2,339
2	BioMarin	950
3	San Rafael City Schools	700
4	City of San Rafael	420
5	Dominican University of California	394
6	Ghilotti Bros., Inc.	298
7	Community Action Marin	200
8	Equator Coffees, LLC	95

=== Entertainment industry ===
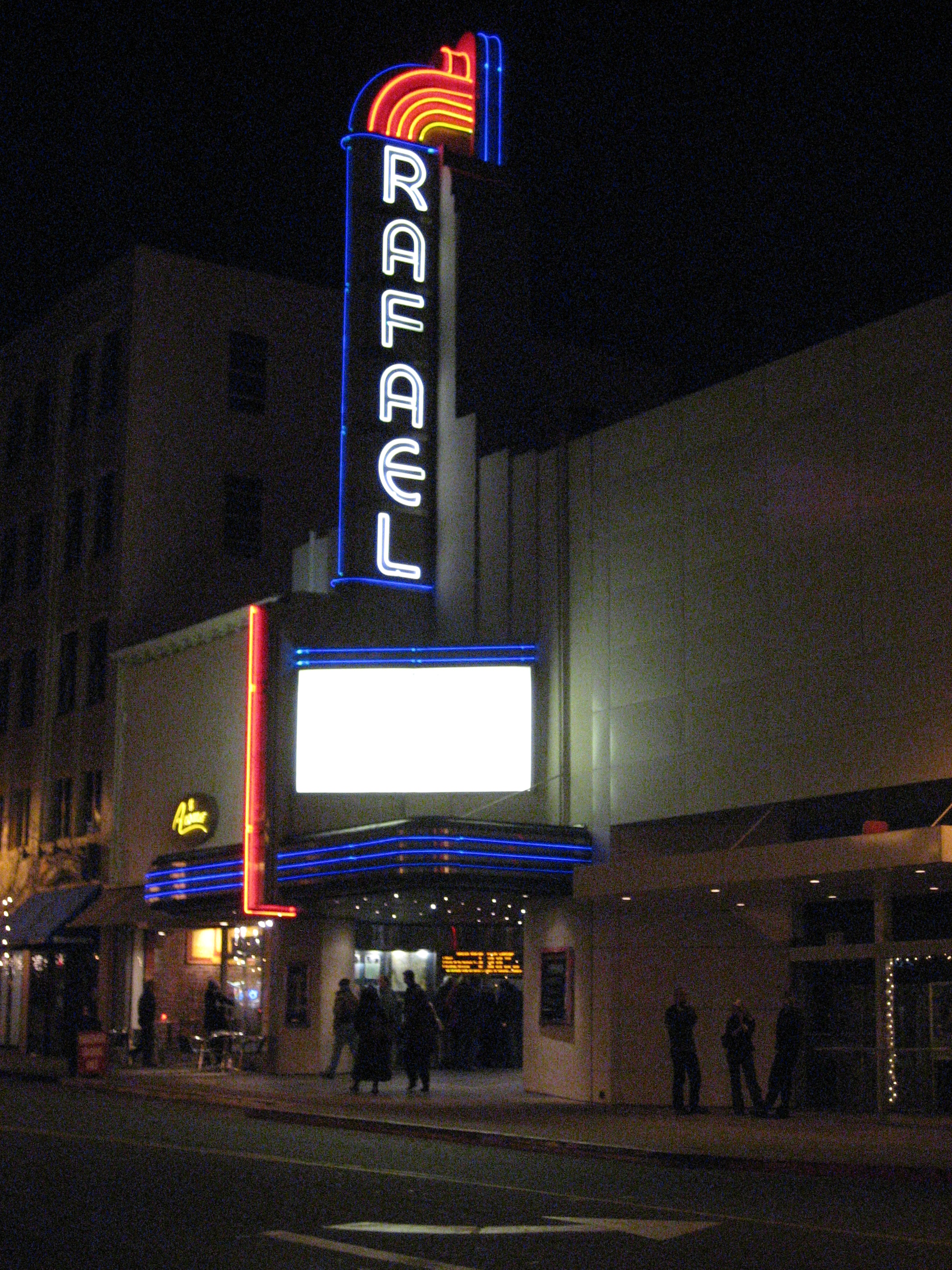
Rafael Theater, famously seen in American Graffiti

After the arrival of George Lucas in San Rafael in 1970 to film the movie THX 1138, the city became a center for the entertainment industry, particularly the high-tech elements of the business. Lucasfilm was founded by George Lucas in 1971, and is best known for the global hit movie series Star Wars and also for Indiana Jones. Some of the company's operations were moved to San Francisco in 2005. Portions of the Universal movie production American Graffiti were filmed in downtown San Rafael under George Lucas's direction, and portions of THX 1138 were shot at the Marin County Civic Center in San Rafael. Much of the movie Gattaca, starring Ethan Hawke, was also shot in the Marin County Civic Center. Industrial Light & Magic was founded in 1975 by Lucas to do special effects for his films and those of other filmmakers. The new-age music program Hearts of Space has been headquartered in San Rafael since 2004.

Largely because of the presence of LucasFilm, San Rafael started to attract video game developers, with several major studios located in the city:

- Broderbund — Founded by Doug Carlston and Gary Carlston in 1980, the company was sold to Mindscape in 1998 and moved to Novato. Best known for the hit titles Choplifter, Lode Runner, The Print Shop, Where in the World is Carmen Sandiego? and Myst, and for being the early distributor of SimCity. After several subsequent acquisitions by various companies, in 2001 the remaining Broderbund offices were moved to San Francisco.
- LucasArts — Founded by George Lucas in (1984) as LucasFilm Games; relocated to San Francisco in 2005. Best known for Star Wars and Indiana Jones games and innovative titles such as The Secret of Monkey Island, Grim Fandango and Full Throttle.
- Stormfront Studios — Founded by San Rafael native Don Daglow in 1988. Best known for The Lord of the Rings: The Two Towers, many EA Sports titles including NASCAR Racing, Gold Box role-playing video games and the first graphical MMORPG, Neverwinter Nights.
- Visual Concepts — Founded by Greg Thomas in 1988, the company was bought by Sega in 1999, then sold to Take Two Interactive in 2004. Best known for creating many EA Sports titles, and recently for Sega Sports and its 2K line of sports games.
- Totally Games — Founded by former LucasArts programmer Larry Holland in 1994. Best known for a series of Star Wars flight sim games.
- THX — the high-fidelity audio/visual reproduction standard which started as a spin-off from Lucasfilm Ltd., founded by Tomlinson Holman at George Lucas's company.
- Factor 5 — Founded in Germany in 1987 by Julian Eggebrecht, moved to San Rafael in 1996 to be close to publisher LucasArts. Best known for Star Wars and Indiana Jones games. In May 2009, the company's San Rafael studio closed.
- Telltale Games — Founded in 2004 by former LucasArts employees. Best known for its video game adaptation of The Walking Dead and Sam & Max adventure games. The company filed for bankruptcy on November 14, 2018.
- Mind Control Software — Founded in 1994 by Andrew Leker, Best known for its Independent Games Festival–winning game, Oasis.

== Parks ==
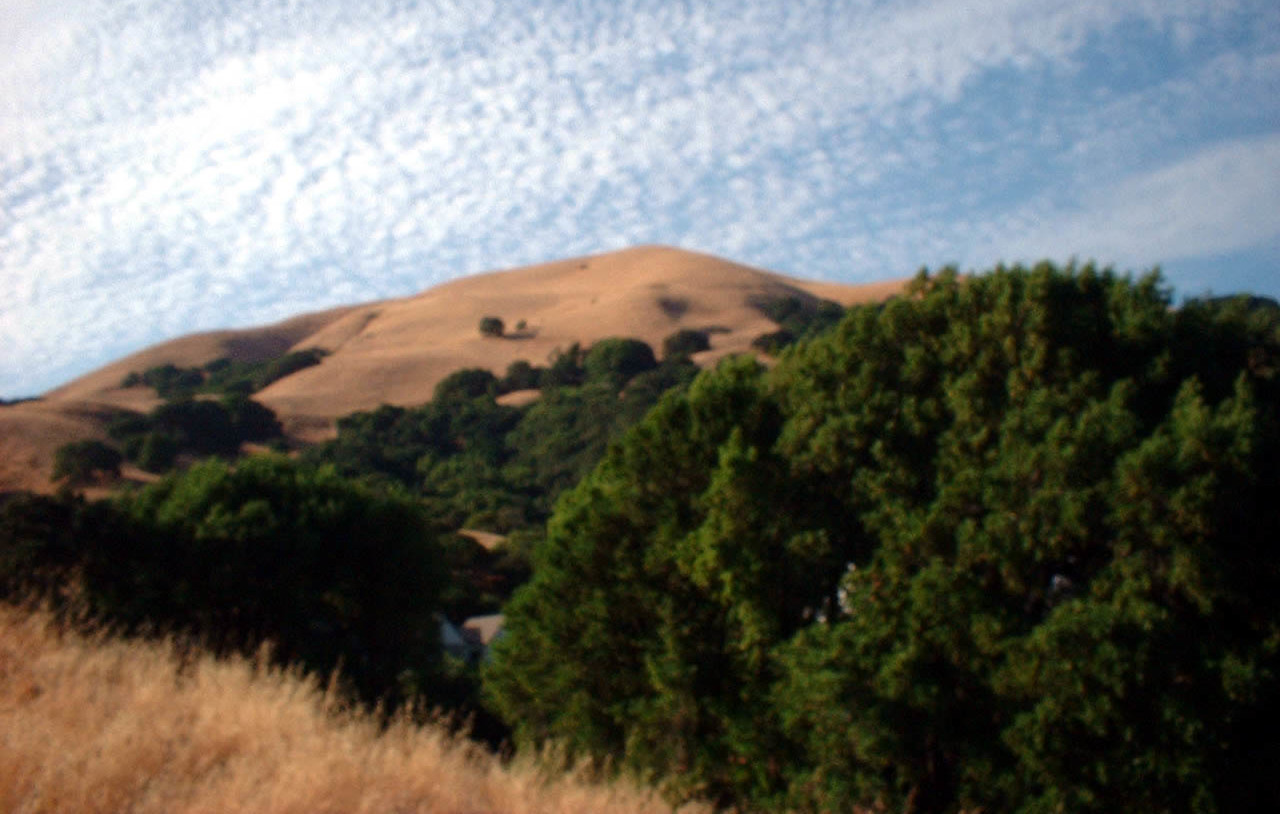
Big Rock Ridge

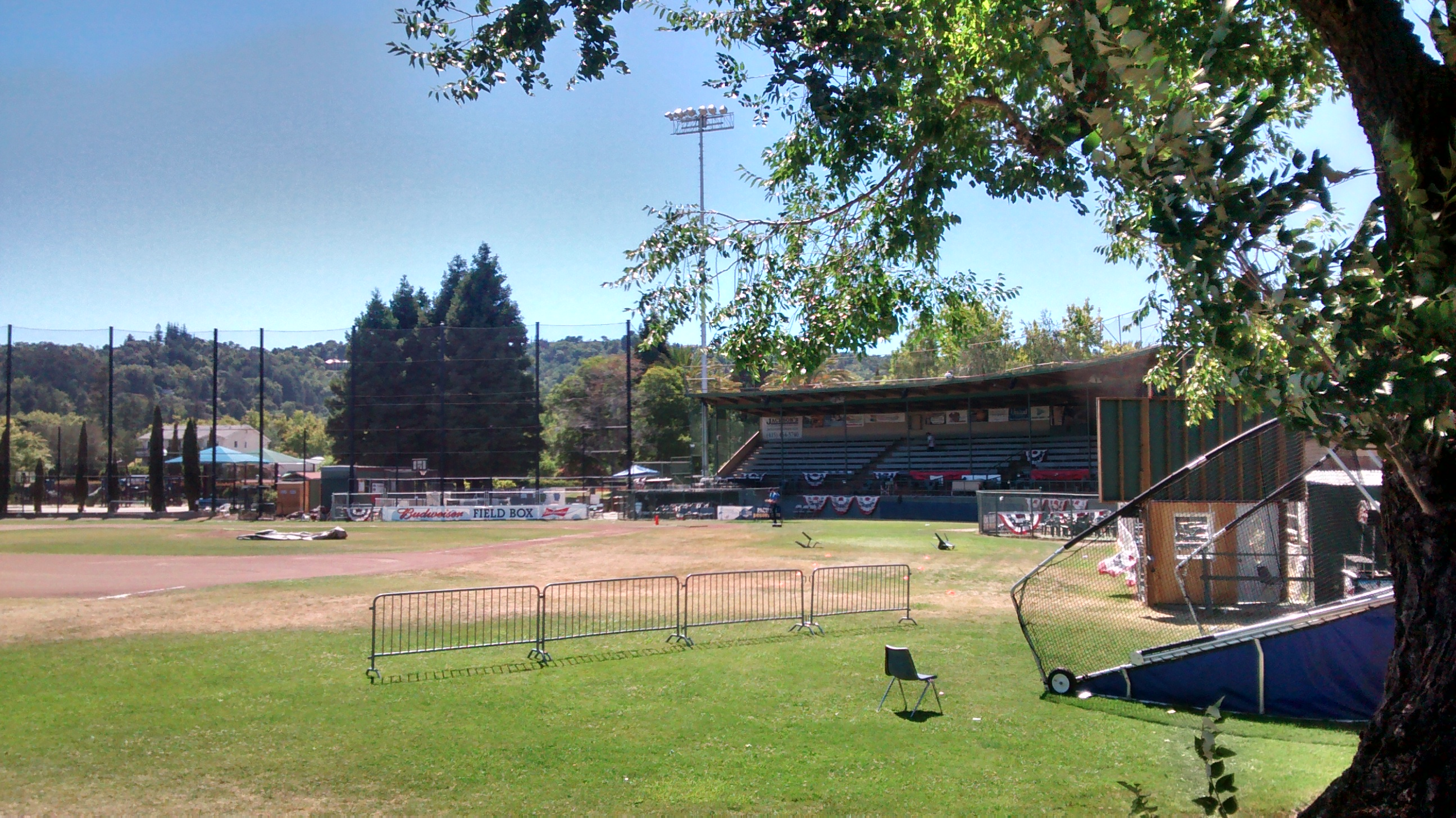
Albert Park, home of the San Rafael Pacifics

Community in San Rafael include Albert Park, Boyd Park, Gerstle Park, Pickleweed Park and the Terra Linda Recreational Center.

Notable large parks include China Camp State Park and McNear's Beach Park.

There are a number of neighborhood parks and mini-parks such as Bret Harte Park, Boyd Park, Sun Valley Park, Oleander Park, Victor Jones Park, Peacock Gap Park and Gerstle Park.

Gerstle Park is also a historic and walkable neighborhood south of First Street in close proximity to central Downtown.

== Government ==
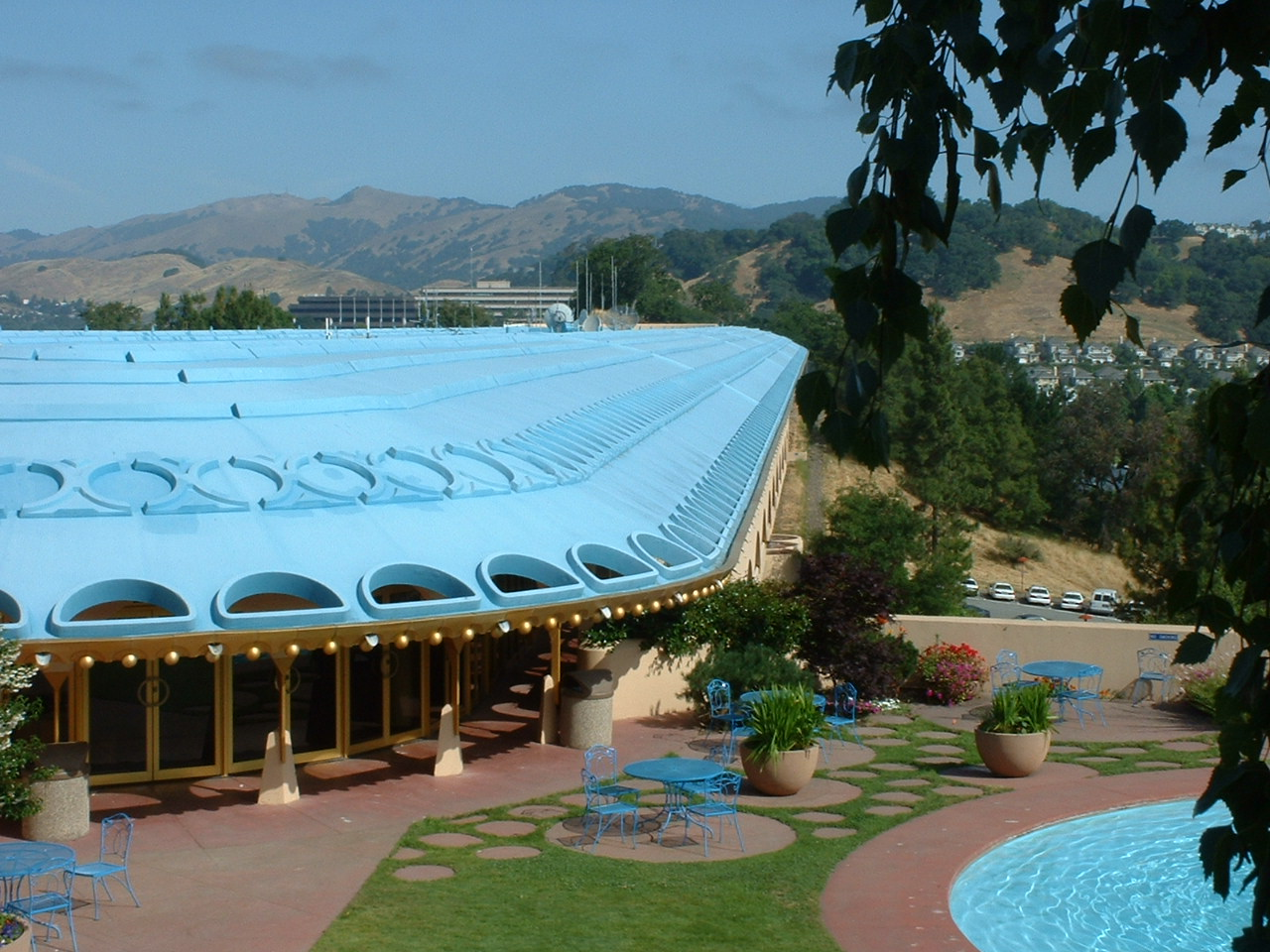
Marin County Civic Center was designed by Frank Lloyd Wright.

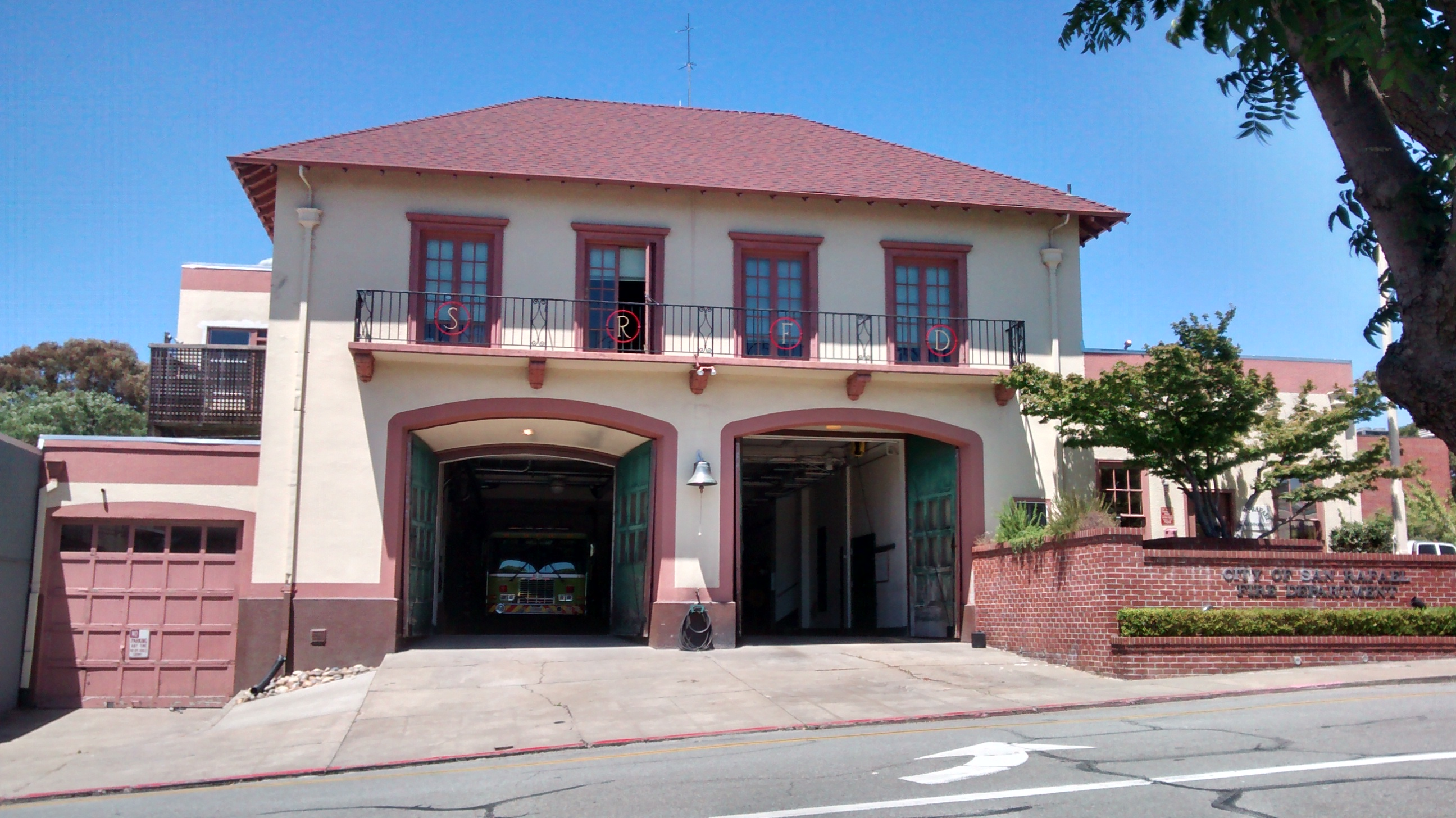
San Rafael Fire Dept.

San Rafael is a stronghold of the Democratic Party. According to the California Secretary of State, as of February 10, 2019, San Rafael has 31,288 registered voters. Of those, 17,566 (56.1%) are registered Democrats, 4,292 (13.7%) are registered Republicans, and 8,121 (26%) have declined to state a political party.

San Rafael is governed by a city council with five members, four of which are elected by geographic district for four-year terms. Each Councilmember is required to live in the district they represent and are elected only by the registered voters of that district. The Mayor is elected at-large. The current members are:

- Mayor Kate Colin
- District 1 Councilmember: Maika Llorens Gulati
- District 2 Councilmember: Eli Hill
- District 3 Councilmember: Maribeth Bushey
- District 4 Councilmember: Rachel Kertz

=== Federal and state ===
In the United States House of Representatives, San Rafael is in California's 2nd congressional district, represented by Democrat Jared Huffman.

From 2008 to 2012, Huffman represented Marin County in the California State Assembly.

In the California State Legislature, San Rafael is in:

- the 12th Assembly district, represented by Democrat Damon Connolly
- the 2nd senatorial district, represented by Democrat Mike McGuire

== Education ==
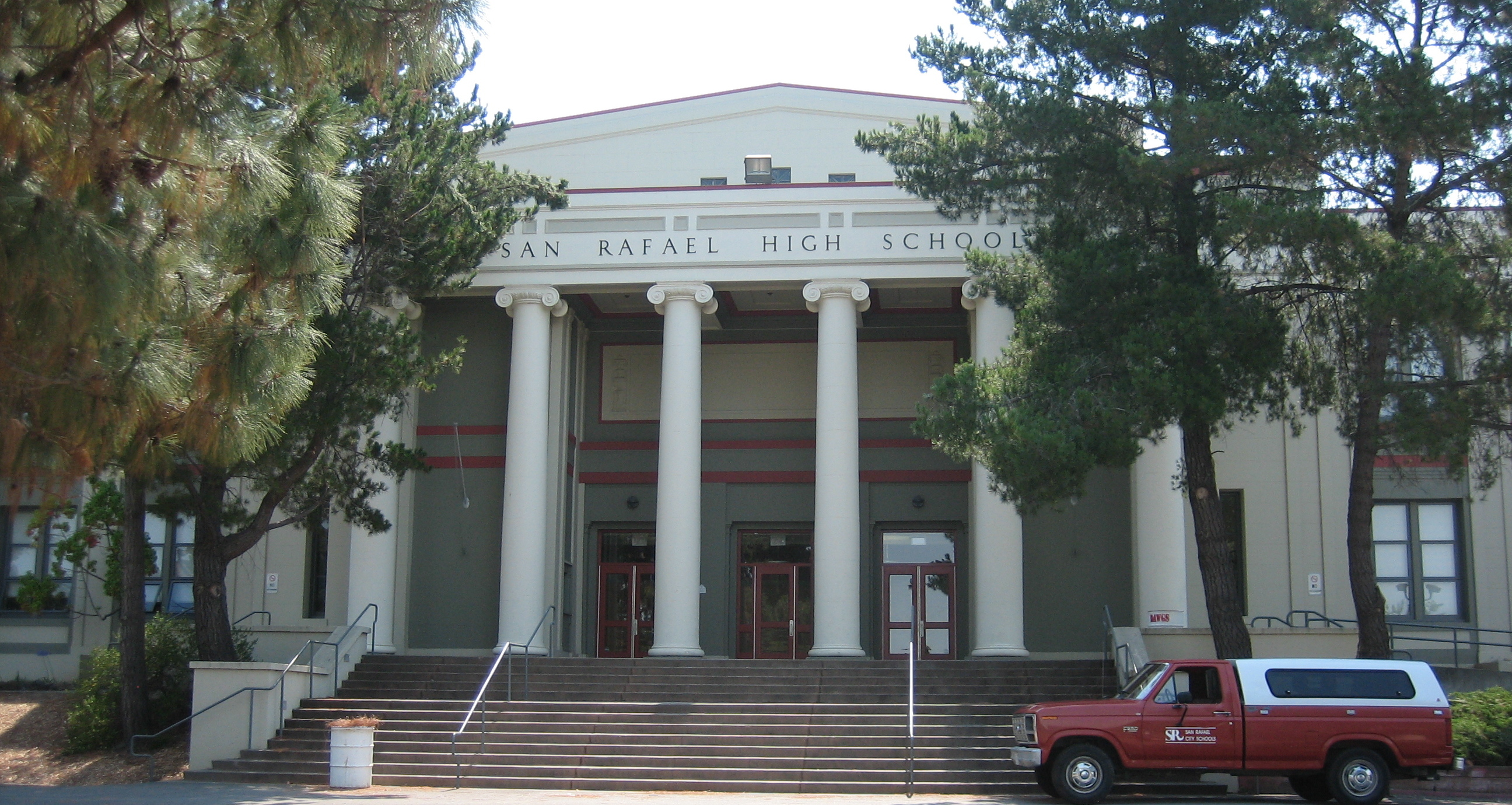
San Rafael High School

San Rafael has one university, Dominican University of California.

The Ali Akbar College of Music, was founded in San Rafael by Indian musician Ali Akbar Khan to teach Indian classical music. San Rafael is also the home to one of the two campuses of Guide Dogs for the Blind, a guide dog training school.

Most public schools in San Rafael are operated by the San Rafael City Schools district. Miller Creek Elementary School District operates some public elementary and middle schools north of San Rafael proper. All comprehensive public high schools are governed by San Rafael City Schools. The district operates two comprehensive public high schools: San Rafael High School, Terra Linda High School and one alternative high school, Madrone. In 2006, the San Rafael City Schools district removed The Bronze Bow from their social studies curriculum, after allegations of the book showing Jews in a bad light compared to Christians.

Notable private schools include Marin Academy, Mark Day School, Saint Raphael School, and Brandeis Marin.

The Marin School was a private nonsectarian school that closed in 2023.

== Transportation ==
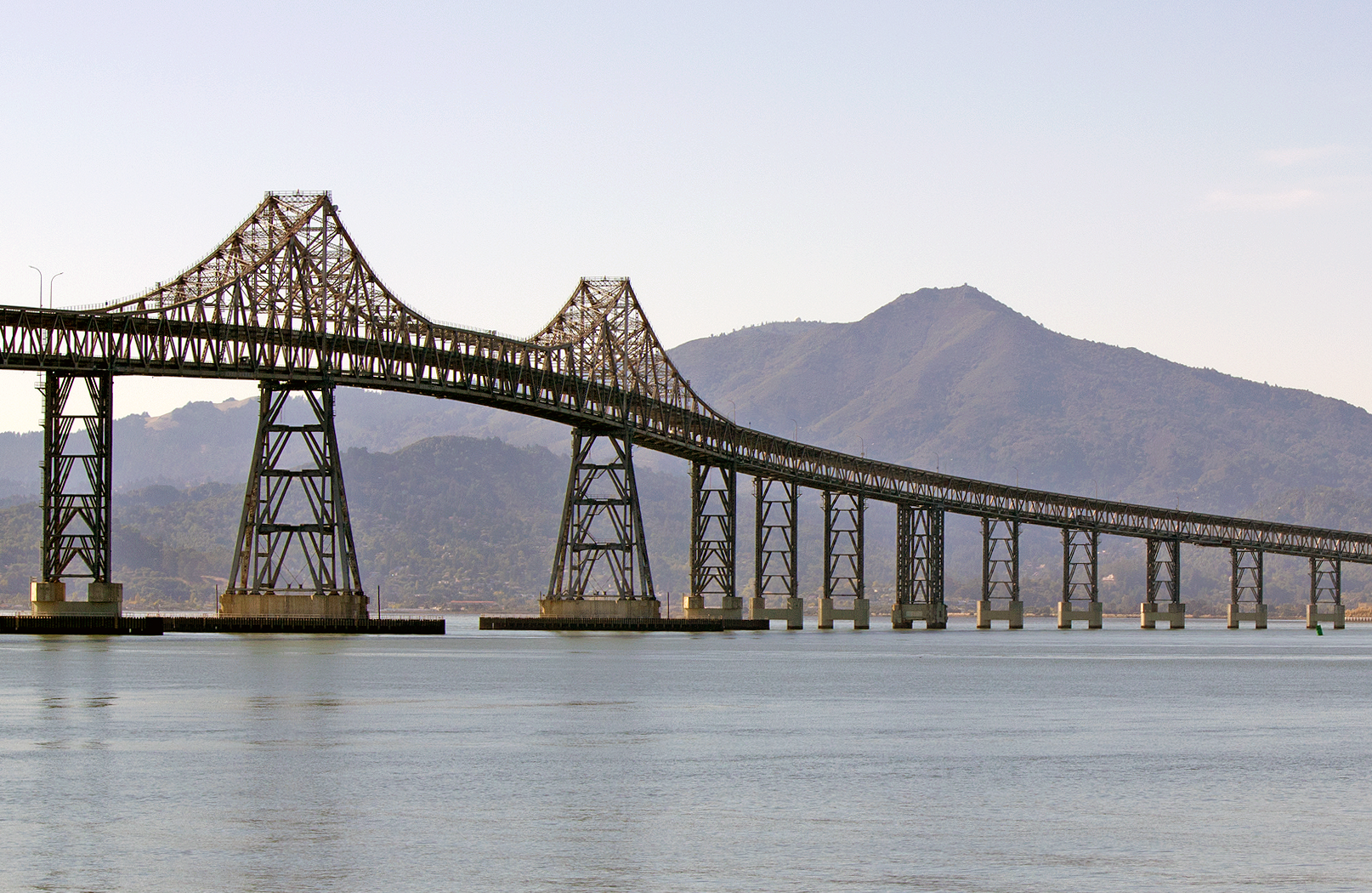
Richmond–San Rafael Bridge

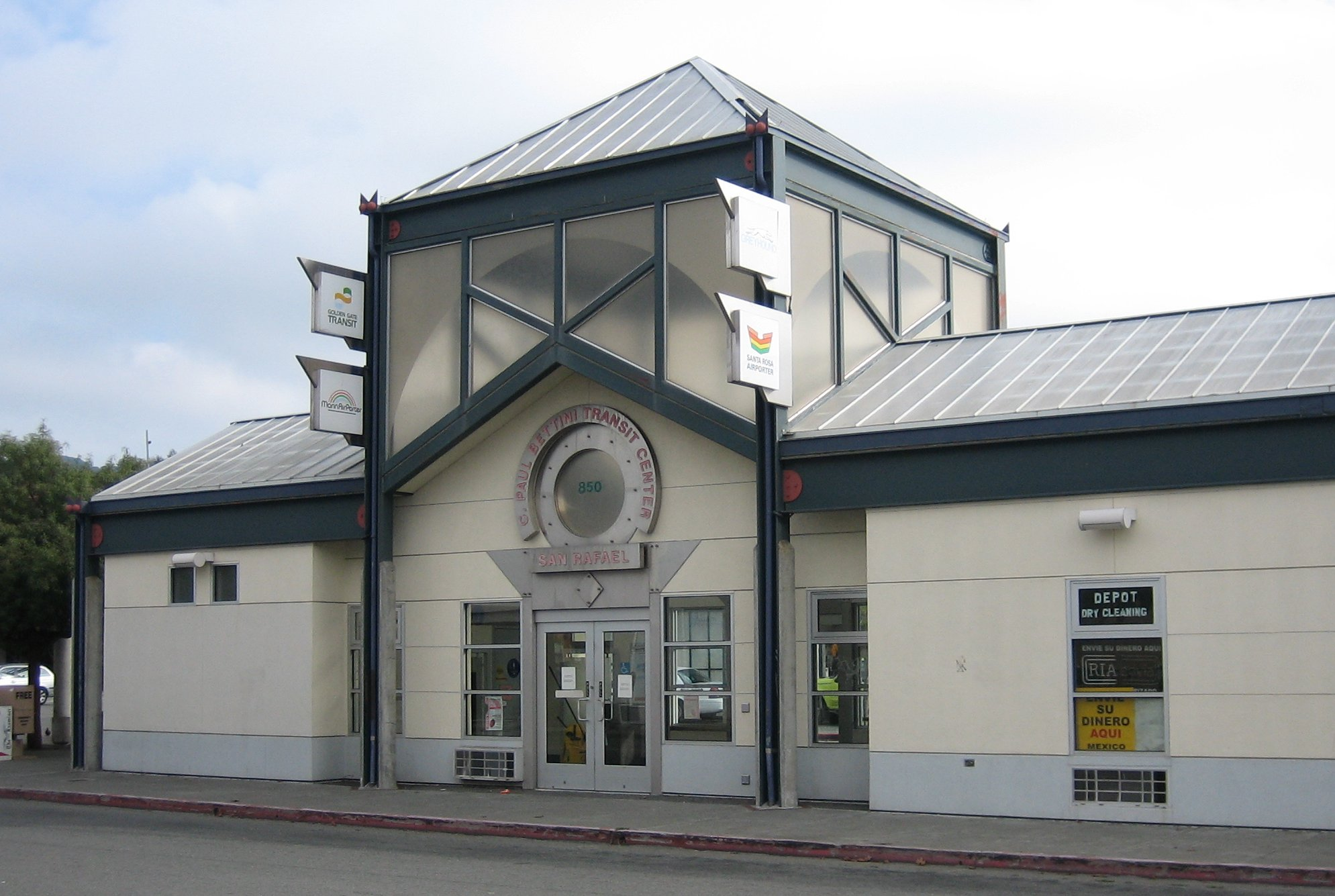
San Rafael Transit Center

The major north–south freeway through San Rafael is U.S. Route 101, connecting the North Coast and the Redwood Empire to the north, and San Francisco to the south. Interstate 580 heads across the Richmond–San Rafael Bridge to the East Bay.

The San Rafael Transit Center, located at the corner of 3rd and Hetherton Streets, is served by a number of bus agencies, including Golden Gate Transit, Marin Transit, Sonoma County Airport Express, and Greyhound. Local bus service is provided primarily by Golden Gate Transit and Marin Transit.

Commuter rail by Sonoma–Marin Area Rail Transit (SMART) serves the city at two stations: a converted San Rafael Transit Center and a station at Marin Civic Center. The line to Santa Rosa and its Airport opened in 2017 bringing passenger rail to San Rafael for the first time since 1958. Until 1958, San Rafael was served by the Northwestern Pacific Railroad. The line from San Rafael was extended to Larkspur to make Larkspur Landing ferry connection in December 2019.

== In popular culture ==
The term "420", as used in reference to cannabis consumption, originated in San Rafael. A group of students of the San Rafael High School class of 1975 known as the Waldos used "420" as a code for smoking marijuana at 4:20 p.m., after school.

Shel Silverstein's poem "The Smoke-Off" is about a girl named Pearly Sweetcakes who came from San Rafael.

The TV show 13 Reasons Why is based in San Rafael, and many scenes from the first season were filmed downtown.

== Notable people ==
- Isabel Allende, author
- Dave Archer, artist
- Stacey Bailey, former American football wide receiver, Atlanta Falcons
- Elizabeth Charleston, painter
- Philip K. Dick, novelist
- George Duke, keyboardist, composer, singer-songwriter and record producer
- William English, contributed to the development of the computer mouse
- Justine Frischmann, lead singer of Elastica and visual artist
- Brad Gilbert, professional tennis player and coach
- Jared Goff, quarterback for the Detroit Lions
- Lauren Grandcolas, a 9/11 victim on United Flight 93
- Marc Diraison, voice actor
- Cynthia Harvey (born 1957), ballet dancer and educator
- Llewellyn F. Haskell (1842–1929), United States Army officer and a Union general during the American Civil War
- James Hetfield, musician, lead singer of Metallica
- Jared Huffman, U.S. representative and California assemblyman
- Michael Johnson, sprinter, 1996 Atlanta Olympics gold medalist, resides in the hills above San Rafael
- Rick Kranitz, former minor league pitcher for the Milwaukee Brewers and now the pitching coach for the Atlanta Braves
- Christian Mortensen (1882–1998), supercentenarian, the one-time oldest living human male, aged 115 years and 252 days at his death
- Gladys Kathleen Parkin, wireless radio operator
- Col. Boris Pash (1900–1995), United States Army intelligence officer
- Charles Dormon Robinson, painter
- Dana Sabraw, U.S. District Judge
- Marin Sais, actress
- Carlos Santana, musician
- Michael Savage, radio host, author, activist, nutritionist, conservative political commentator, host of The Savage Nation
- Scott Thunes, musician
- Natu Tuatagaloa, former professional football player in the NFL
- William W. Turner, author and FBI agent.
- Will Venable, former professional Major League Baseball player
- Winston Venable, former NFL and CFL linebacker.

== Sister cities ==
- San Rafael del Norte, Nicaragua
- Lonate Pozzolo, province of Varese, Italy
- Falkirk, Scotland
- Chiang Mai, Thailand
- (Mexico) Peto, México
