= Las Gallinas Valley =

Valley in Marin County, California, United States

Coordinates: 38°1′39″N 122°34′2″W

Las Gallinas Valley or Gallinas Valley is a geographical valley landform of Marin County, California, United States formed by Miller Creek. It is also the name of a major planning area of Marin County.
