= Big Rock Ridge =

Ridge near Novato, California

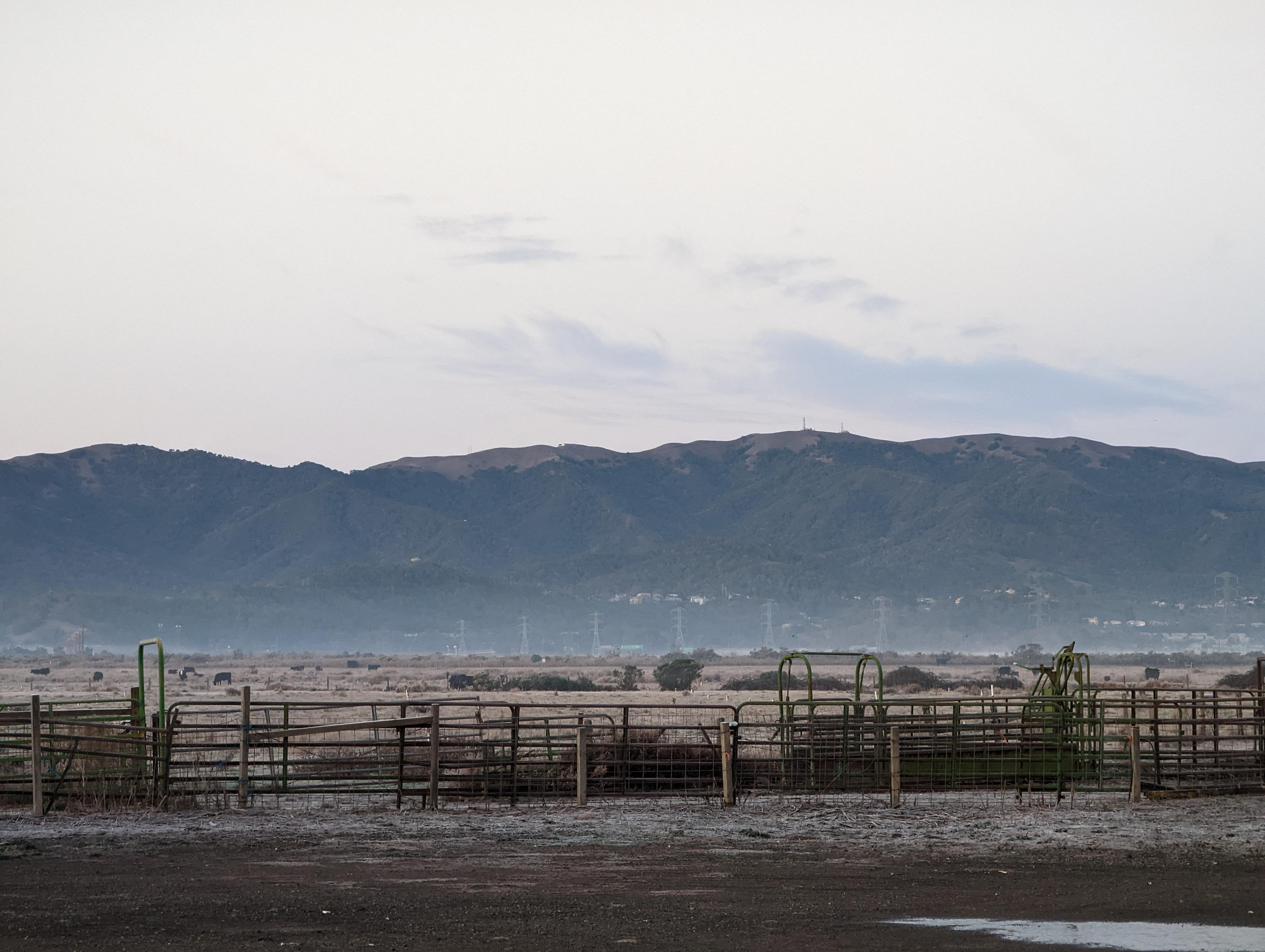
- Big Rock Ridge, as seen from the Northeast

Highest point
- Elevation: 1,887 ft (575 m)
- Prominence: 1,287 ft (392 m)
- Coordinates: 38°3′33″N 122°36′15″W

Geography
- Location within California Location within the United States Location within San Francisco Bay Area
- Location: Marin County, California, U.S.
- Parent range: California Coast Ranges
- Topo map: USGS Novato

Climbing
- Easiest route: Big Rock Trail

Big Rock Ridge is a ridge near Novato, California, and the 2nd tallest point in Marin County. The ridge is 5 miles long, and runs from the northwest to the east, dividing Novato's Ignacio Valley and San Rafael's Lucas Valley, and separating Novato from central and southern Marin County. Big Rock Ridge is named after the rock at the base of Big Rock Trail.

== Land management and recreation ==
Much of the ridge is managed and owned by Marin County Open Space and Marinwood Open Space Districts as well as various ranching families.

Various public trails run up the ridge, with the majority converging at the Big Rock Ridge Fire Road, which runs along the top of the ridge to access the 2 radio towers at the top. The easiest way to the ridge's highest point is the 6.7 mile Big Rock Trail, which opened in 2003 when George Lucas donated 800 acres of land to create the Lucas Valley Open Space Preserve.

== Geography ==
Big Rock Ridge is the second-highest point in the Marin Hills, which in turn are a part of the California Coast Ranges. Much of eastern Big Rock Ridge is public land, with the Lucas Valley and Ignacio Open Space Preserves covering much of the foothills. Much of the eastern side also falls within city limits, with the northeastern side being in Novato and the southeastern side falling within Lucas Valley-Marinwood.

The views from Big Rock Ridge are sweeping, with views to Mt. St Helena, Mt. Diablo and on a clear day the Sierra Nevada from the top.

== Geology ==
Much of the soil on the northern slope is Tocaloma-McMullen Complex soil, which is mostly gravelly loam with a medium to high runoff class. With a land capability classification of 7e and extremely steep slopes, most of the land is unsuitable for cultivation. The southern slope is much more varied when it comes to soil types, but they all share a high runoff class and a land capability classification of 7e. Nearly all of the soil on the north slope is extremely prone to runoff, and is in Hydrologic Soil Group D. The south slope is more mixed.

== Hydrology ==
The headwaters of Miller Creek are found at the confluence of various creeks stemming from Loma Alta and Big Rock Ridge. Seasonal creeks like Arroyo San Jose, Arroyo Avichi, Ignacio Creek and Vineyard Creek begin on the northern flank of the ridge.
