= Miller Creek (Marin County, California) =

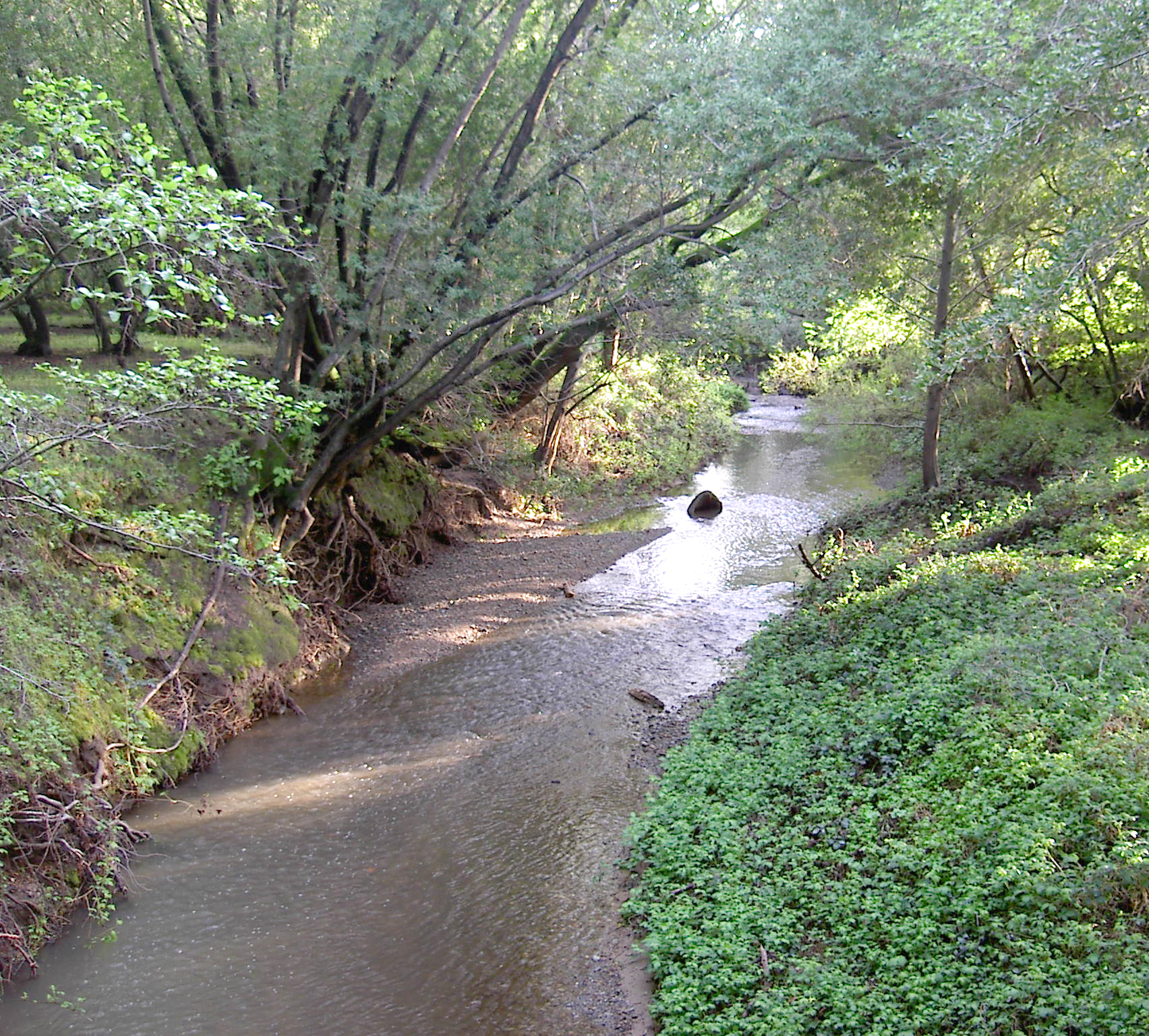
- Miller Creek in April 2010.

- Location of the mouth within California

Location
- Country: United States
- State: California
- Region: Marin County
- City: Lucas Valley-Marinwood

Physical characteristics
- Source: Big Rock Ridge
  - location: southwest of Novato
  - coordinates: 38°3′40″N 122°36′48″W
  - elevation: 1,670 ft (510 m)
- Mouth: San Pablo Bay
  - coordinates: 38°1′53″N 122°29′54″W
  - elevation: 0 ft (0 m)

Miller Creek is a 7.6-mile-long (12.2 km) stream in eastern Marin County, California, United States. It originates on Big Rock Ridge and empties into San Pablo Bay east of Marinwood. A middle school called Miller Creek Middle School was named after the creek and is home to 6th, 7th, and 8th graders.

== History ==
The name honors James Miller, an Irishman who settled on part of Rancho San Pedro, Santa Margarita y Las Gallinas in 1845.

== Watershed and Course ==
The Miller Creek watershed drains 11.6 square miles (30 km^{2}). Miller Creek originates on Big Rock Ridge southwest of the city of Novato. It descends southward to Lucas Valley Road, where it turns eastward into Gallinas Valley, paralleling the road to Miller Creek Road. There it crosses Lucas Valley Road and jogs northward through Marinwood Park before turning east again along the southern edge of Marinwood. It crosses under U.S. Route 101 at milepost 15.35 and flows through channels in McInnes County Park to empty into the west end of San Pablo Bay.

== Ecology ==
In recent years, steelhead trout (Oncorhyncus mykiss) of multiple ages have been identified in Miller Creek. It has been identified by EPA, Marin County Public Works and California Department of Fish and Game for restoration potential for trout because it has high quality connected riparian habitat, minimal barriers to fish passage and no reservoirs.

== Habitat and pollution ==
The California Coastal Commission considers Miller Creek a Critical Coastal Area because it is an impaired water body (listed under Section 303(d) of the U.S. Clean Water Act) which adjoins the San Pablo Bay National Wildlife Refuge. Livestock have grazed on the watershed since the 1800s, causing widening and downcutting of the creek. It continues to carry a heavy load of sediment from grazing activity, and its lower reaches are also impacted by suburban development.

== Bridges ==
Miller Creek is spanned by numerous bridges, including:

- at Lucas Valley Road, a 132-foot (40 m) concrete continuous slab built in 1961 and a 67-foot (20 m) concrete tee beam built in 1959.
- at U.S. Route 101, an 88-foot (27 m) concrete continuous slab built in 1952 and reconstructed in 1987.
- at Mount Shasta Drive, an 88-foot (27 m) concrete continuous slab built in 1962.
- at Mount Lassen Drive, a 78-foot (24 m) concrete continuous slab built in 1965 and a 31-foot (9 m) concrete slab built in 1925.
- at Mount McKinley Road, a 63-foot (19 m) concrete continuous slab built in 1963.
- at Bridgegate Drive, a 62-foot (19 m) prestressed concrete tee beam built in 1987.
- at Las Gallinas Avenue, a 53-foot (16 m) concrete continuous slab built in 1970.

== See also ==
- List of watercourses in the San Francisco Bay Area
- Novato Creek
