= Terra Linda =

Terra Linda may refer to:

- Terra Linda, San Rafael, California
- Terra Linda High School
