= Daniel Andreas San Diego =

American domestic terrorism suspect

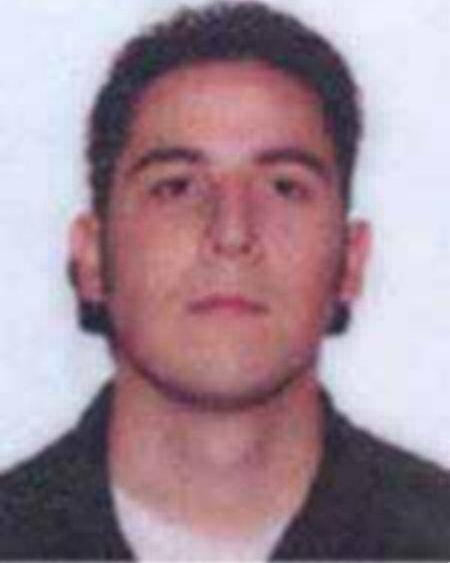
- San Diego's FBI mugshot (2009)
- Born: February 9, 1978 (age 48); Berkeley, California, US
- Other name: Danny Stephen Webb
- Citizenship: United States
- Occupation: IT consultant
- Organization: Animal Liberation Brigade
- Judicial status: Extradition from the United Kingdom to the United States (February 2026)

Details
- Victims: 0 deaths, 0 injuries
- Date: August 28, 2003, (Chiron Corporation in Emeryville, California); September 26, 2003 (Shaklee Corporation in Pleasanton, California)
- Targets: Chiron Corporation, Emeryville, California; Shaklee Corporation, Pleasanton, California
- Weapon: Explosives
- Date apprehended: November 2024 (Wales)

Daniel Andreas San Diego (born February 9, 1978) is an American domestic terrorism suspect who was listed on the FBI Most Wanted Terrorists list. He is a straight edge vegan environmentalist and animal liberationist who the FBI believes has unspecified ties to an Animal Liberation Brigade cell responsible for two bombings in 2003. San Diego is also believed by the FBI to have ties to Stop Huntingdon Animal Cruelty.

In November 2024, San Diego was arrested near Conwy, Wales, by the UK's National Crime Agency, after more than 20 years on the run. In February 2026, Judge Samuel Goozee of the Westminster Magistrates' Court ruled that San Diego could be extradited to the United States. As of February 2026, the Home Secretary is yet to make the final decision, but Sky News noted that this is "expected to be a formality".

== Background ==
San Diego was born on February 9, 1978 in Berkeley, California, and grew up in San Rafael, California. He attended Terra Linda High School. He took classes at College of Marin and worked at San Rafael High School's radio station, KSRH, listening to heavy metal and rock music. As a young man, he gave up drugs, alcohol, meat, and milk products, taking an interest in the straight edge movement and becoming vegan.

At the time of the bombings, he lived in Schellville, California, a small community outside of Sonoma, where he worked as a computer specialist. His landlord described him as "very nice and personable," mentioned his claim to be starting a new business venture of vegan marshmallows made without gelatin, and said that he had never given the impression of holding radical views on animal rights. The FBI claims this was all an act.

The FBI says that as a San Francisco Bay Area animal rights activist San Diego has ties to Stop Huntingdon Animal Cruelty (SHAC), an international campaign against Huntingdon Life Sciences (HLS), Europe's largest drug and chemical animal testing laboratory. Before the related bombings, SHAC targeted HLS customer Chiron and its employees with a series of actions, accusing them of being "puppy killers."

== Animal Liberation Brigade ==
On August 28, 2003, two sophisticated homemade bombs exploded approximately one hour apart, at the Chiron Corporation in Emeryville, California, causing minor property damage but no injuries. The FBI believes the second bomb was timed to target first responders. Another bomb, wrapped with nails to produce shrapnel, exploded on September 26, 2003, at the Shaklee Corporation in Pleasanton, California, again causing damage but no casualties. The bombs used ammonium nitrate explosives and mechanical timers.

A group called the Revolutionary Cells – Animal Liberation Brigade claimed responsibility via an email message after each bombing, demanding the businesses terminate their involvement with Huntingdon Life Sciences and threatened future violence. FBI agents admit that they cannot prove San Diego has ties to the emails, but believe he has ties to the group that sent them. The FBI stated San Diego is suspected of having carried out the bombing. The bombing targets were chosen because they were both clients of Huntingdon Life Sciences.

== Disappearance ==
The FBI had San Diego under 24-hour surveillance in 2003. He discovered that he was being watched and on October 6, 2003, drove into downtown San Francisco, California, before disappearing from his still running car near a subway station. FBI agents subsequently found bomb making equipment in his parked car.

== Most Wanted ==
Daniel Andreas San Diego was indicted in 2004. He became the first domestic terrorism suspect to be added to the FBI Most Wanted Terrorists List, and first animal rights activist. In 2014, as part of the FBI's National Digital Billboard Initiative, San Diego was to be featured on electronic billboards throughout California, Massachusetts, Oregon, Nevada, and Florida, and along the US-Canada border in New York and Washington State. At one point, the FBI believed he was in the Northampton, Massachusetts, area. In early 2014, the FBI announced that they had "credible intelligence" that San Diego might be on Hawaii's Big Island.

San Diego was profiled on America's Most Wanted five times after his disappearance.

As of February 2022, a reward of up to US$250,000 was available for information that leads to the arrest of San Diego.

== Capture and extradition ==
On November 25, 2024, Daniel Andreas San Diego was captured in Maenan, near Llanrwst in Conwy, North Wales. When arrested, he carried an Irish passport with the name "Danny Stephen Webb". San Diego appeared in court in London for extradition to the U.S. to face outstanding terrorist charges. He was sent to the HMP Belmarsh after his arrest.

In 2025, his attorneys argued against extradition to the United States, claiming San Diego will not receive a fair trial there.

In February 2026, Judge Samuel Goozee of the Westminster Magistrates' Court ruled that San Diego could be extradited to the United States. As of February 2026, The Home Secretary is yet to make the final decision, but Sky News noted that this is "expected to be a formality".

== See also ==
- Animal Liberation Front
