= Plastic Facts =

EP by The Nu Kats
- Recorded: July–August 1980
- Genre: Rock
- Label: Rhino Records
- Producer: Larry Lee

The Nu Kats - Plastic Facts recorded at Studio Orange, mixed at The Music Grinder Hollywood in 1980. Produced by Larry Lee

== Track listing ==
Side One

1. "World All Alone" (Pete McRae, F. Moore)
2. "Busy Body" (F. Moore)

Side Two

1. "It's Not A Rumour" (Freddy Moore, Demi Moore)
2. "Out Of The Combat Zone" (F. Moore)
3. "I Was A Teenage Shoplifter" (F. Moore)

== Personnel ==
- Al Galles - drums, harmony, cowbell, claps
- Bobbyzio Moore - sax, keyboards, guitar, maracas, tambourine, claps
- Freddy Moore - lead vocals, 6 & 12 string, harmony, tambourine, claps
- Dennis Peters - bass, harmony, fuzz guitar, snaps, claps
- Larry Lee - producer, piano, harmony, claps, snaps
- Tony Cassella - engineer at Studio Orange
- Gary Skardina - mix engineer at Music Grinder
- Bobbyzio Moore - choir
- Monica Lustgarten - choir
- Maggie Lee - choir
- Demi Moore - choir
- Scott Brandt - road manager
- Jerry Garns - cover photo
- Sandii Procter - make up
- Loni Specter - liner photo
- Harold Bronson - liner notes
