= Natu Tuatagaloa =

American football player (born 1966)

No. 96, 62, 99, 98
- Position: Defensive end

Personal information
- Born: May 25, 1966 (age 60); San Francisco, California, U.S.
- Listed height: 6 ft 4 in (1.93 m)
- Listed weight: 273 lb (124 kg)

Career information
- High school: San Rafael (San Rafael, California)
- College: California
- NFL draft: 1989: 5th round, 138th overall pick

Career history
- Cincinnati Bengals (1989–1991); Seattle Seahawks (1992–1993); New Orleans Saints (1995)*; Houston Oilers (1995)
- * Offseason or practice squad member only

Career NFL statistics
- Tackles: 94
- Sacks: 15.5
- Interceptions: 1
- Stats at Pro Football Reference

Gerardus Mauritius "Natu" Tuatagaloa (born May 25, 1966) is an American former professional football player who was a defensive end in the National Football League (NFL). He played college football for the California Golden Bears. He played in the NFL for the 1995 Houston Oilers, Seattle Seahawks in 1992 and 1993, and for the Cincinnati Bengals from 1989 to 1991 . His parents, Gage and Ria Tuatagaloa, are both first-generation immigrants from Western Samoa and The Netherlands. He credits his parents with instilling strong family values and setting a great example of work ethic, determination, perseverance and community involvement.

== Early life ==
Both Tuatagaloa graduated from San Rafael High School in 1984 as a four-sport letterman in football, basketball, boxing and track. Although he was recruited by many schools, he quickly decided to accept a full-ride football scholarship to the University of California, Berkeley.

He was a four-year letterman and three-year starter on the Golden Bears football team with head coaches Joe Kapp (1984–1986) and Bruce Snyder (1987–1988). Tuatagaloa was voted captain his senior year by his teammates. To his benefit, his five-year position coach Rod Marinelli, (2006 Detroit Lions head coach), characterizes the level of talent at a B− while grading the work ethic at an A+. Tuatagaloa earned All Pac-10 honors and held the Golden Bear sack record until 1996. He also was awarded the Brick Muller Award, awarded to the most valuable lineman. Tuatagaloa graduated with a BA in History.

== Professional life ==
Tuatagaloa spent six years playing professional football in the NFL. As a defensive lineman, Tuatagaloa was selected 138th overall in the fifth round of the 1989 NFL draft. He played for the 1989, 1990, and 1991 Cincinnati Bengals under head coach Sam Wyche. Tuatagaloa played for the 1992 and 1993 Seattle Seahawks with coach Tom Flores. Tuatagaloa, in his fifth season, made seven tackles, two sacks and intercepted a pass in exhibition games. Tuatagaloa played for both the New Orleans Saints and Houston Oilers in 1995 under head coaches Jim Mora and Jeff Fisher. He was a plaintiff in a lawsuit filed against the NFL in regarded to the NFL's Plan B free agency rules.

Upon returning to San Rafael in 1996, Tuatagaloa joined IDEX Global Services, Inc. to develop the California Telecommunications Services Division. During his eight-year career at IDEX, Tuatagaloa was involved with all facets of the business and quickly rose through the ranks to ultimately become the President of the Western Region in 2004.

Currently, Tuatagaloa is a Principal at a "Facilities and Technology Infrastructure" company.

Tuatagaloa was elected to the San Rafael City School Board in November 2001 with 31.39% and is currently serving a fourth term as trustee. He has also been the Board President and Vice-President during his terms as Trustee.

Member of the San Rafael Rotary Club #409 in District 5150. He was inducted into the Marin County Athletic Hall of Fame in November 2004. He is also a member of the Board of Directors for the Marin Athletic Foundation.

== Personal life ==
Tuatagaloa and his wife Judy reside in San Rafael with three daughters: Tianna, Malia, and McKenna.
