= Terra Linda, San Rafael, California =

Terra Linda
- Former unincorporated community District of San Rafael
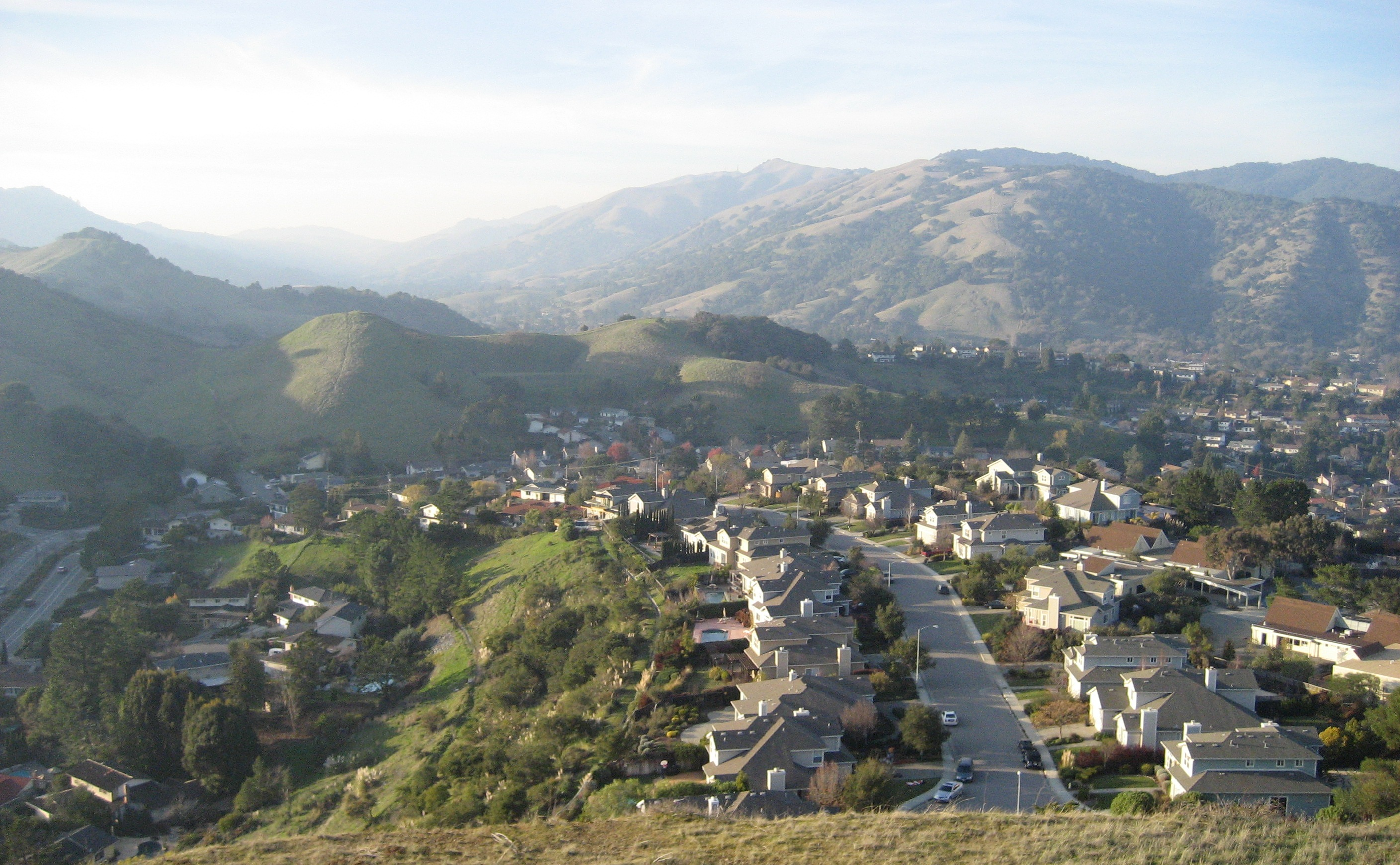
- Terra Linda

- Location in California
- Coordinates: 38°00′15″N 122°32′59″W
- Country: United States
- State: California
- County: Marin County
- City: San Rafael
- Elevation: 171 ft (52 m)

Terra Linda (Portuguese for "Beautiful Land") is a district of the city of San Rafael, California. It was formerly an unincorporated community within Marin County. It lies at an elevation of 171 feet (52 m).

Terra Linda is a residential and light commercial/office community in the Las Gallinas Valley area of Marin County, approximately 14 miles (23 km) north of the Golden Gate Bridge. The housing stock includes about 900 residences built by Joseph Eichler.

== History ==
Terra Linda is located on what was formerly the property of the Manuel T. Freitas family, immigrant Portuguese owners of part of the Rancho San Pedro, Santa Margarita y Las Gallinas Mexican land grant. The ranch was originally operated as a dairy farm. The site of the ranch house and buildings is now the site of St. Isabella's Catholic Church and School.

Terra Linda shares ZIP Code 94903 with Santa Venetia, Marinwood, and Lucas Valley. The Terra Linda post office was established in 1961. Its main streets are Las Gallinas, Freitas Parkway, and Redwood Highway. Early Terra Linda residents formed a Community Services District, and Recreation & Parks District, under the direct authority of the Marin County government. These entities built the public infrastructure that stands today. In the early 1970s, citizens voted to annex these entities to the City of San Rafael. Its population is about 10,000.

Terra Linda is built upon the ancestral lands of the Coast Miwok, specifically land traditionally inhabited by the Tamal Aguasto tribe.

Most of Terra Linda was built after World War II and was largely completed by 1970. Terra Linda was originally developed by the development group Alliance Construction. The first residences were model homes on Hyacinth Way. They were of the then-contemporary Mid-century modern (Eichler) style: concrete-slab foundation; hydronic heat; cork floors; low-pitch, open-beam ceilings; clerestory and gable windows. About 900 homes in Terra Linda were built by Joseph Eichler from 1955 to 1965. The distinctive architectural style of Eichler homes provides an historic element.

The valley's main arteries, Manuel T. Freitas Parkway and Del Ganado Road, follow Santa Margarita Creek, whose bed was cemented over in the early 1960s and turned into a storm trough when the area was developed. Plans are being made to restore the creek to its original state and redesign Freitas Parkway to accommodate the creek, at an estimated cost of $20 million. These plans have been in fruition for years and as of 2018 there is no news about this moving forward. Freitas Parkway was originally designed to have three lanes each way (currently there are two) that cross over the ridge into the Sleepy Hollow neighborhood of San Anselmo. This design was never finished after those lands were purchased by the public and placed into the care of the Marin County Open Space District. Details follow: 1972 San Rafael residents approved a bond issue of $2,250,000 bond issue to purchase open space citywide, including parcels in North San Rafael. 1973 Mont Marin neighborhood formed an assessment district to purchase the 184-acre Mont Marin Open Space for $314,000.

In 1975 Terra Linda residents, with a 76 percent "yes" vote, established a community services area with a $1,150,000 bond issue to purchase open space properties. These funds were combined with $500,000 from the 1972 San Rafael bond and $500,000 from the Open Space District to buy the Nunes, Freitas, de Long and Turski lands, the semi-circle of ridges around Terra Linda.

== Schools ==
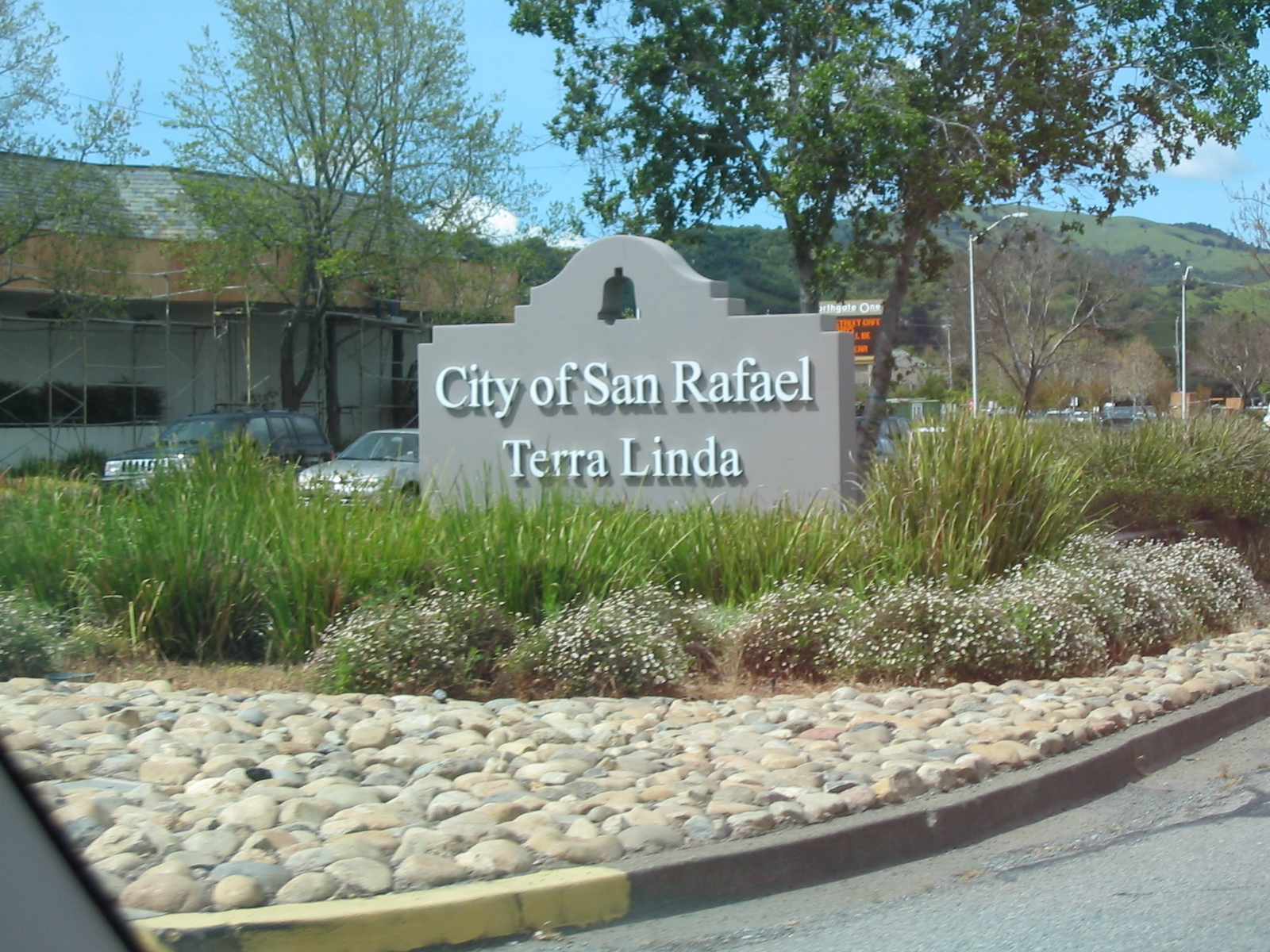
Terra Linda sign in San Rafael

Schools in the Terra Linda area include the Miller Creek Elementary School District (Lucas Valley Elementary School, Mary Silveira Elementary School, Vallecito Elementary School, and Miller Creek Middle School), Terra Linda High School (2010 NCS 2A Rewood Empire Wrestling Champions and rival of San Rafael High School: both are in the San Rafael City High School District), and a number of private schools including St. Isabella's Parish School (a Catholic K-8 school within the Archdiocese of San Francisco), and St. Marks private school. St. Marks was previously known as Don Timoteo Elementary School, named after Don Timoteo Murphy, who built the first house in San Rafael. He was one of the first residents of Marin County and owned a large amount of land in the area. He also managed the property of (Mission San Rafael Arcángel). Montessori operates in Christ Presbyterian Church facilities.

Terra Linda's Marindale School, a school for students who have orthopedic disabilities, was a famous pioneer from the 1950s forward in providing a combination of specialized and mainstream education for its students, who became members of the co-located Santa Margarita School classes for a part of each day.

== Other facilities ==
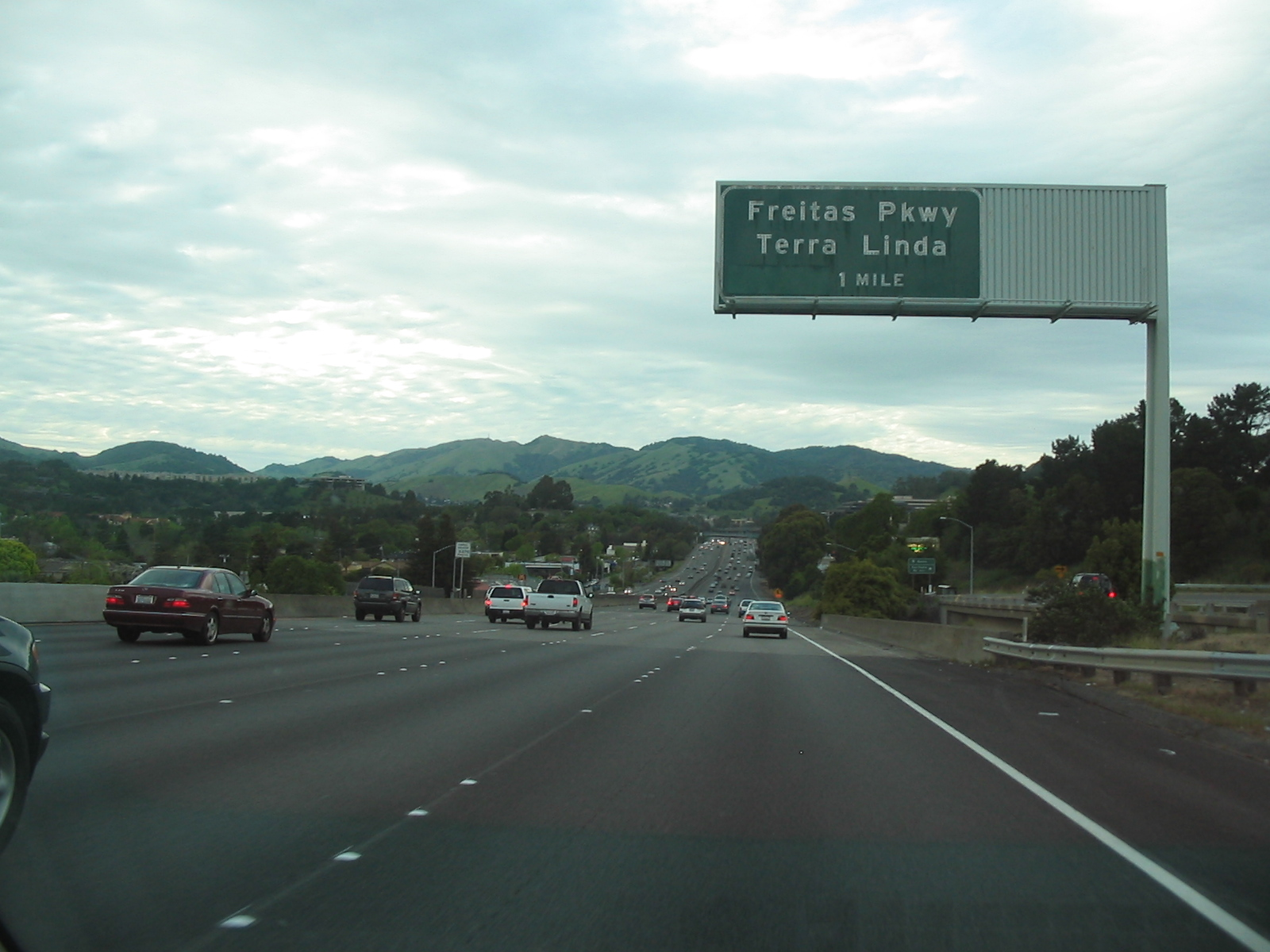
Terra Linda exit sign on Highway 101

The Guide Dogs for the Blind organization, which predates the community, is located at the edge of Terra Linda. Its "students" and trainers can be seen walking Terra Linda and San Rafael streets.

The Mall at Northgate is the only enclosed mall in Marin County. Two anchor tenants dating from its original open-air design were The Emporium, now Macy's, and Sears. There is also a Kohl's (previously Mervyn's) and a 15-screen theater complex, which was once a single-screen theater in another part of the mall. Sears was the only original tenant, now closed; the Kohl's store is new construction since the mall's enclosure, and Macy's was the Emporium before the enclosure. The original theater was located a half-dozen storefronts north of its present location. Since 2008, the mall underwent an extensive remodeling and modernization.

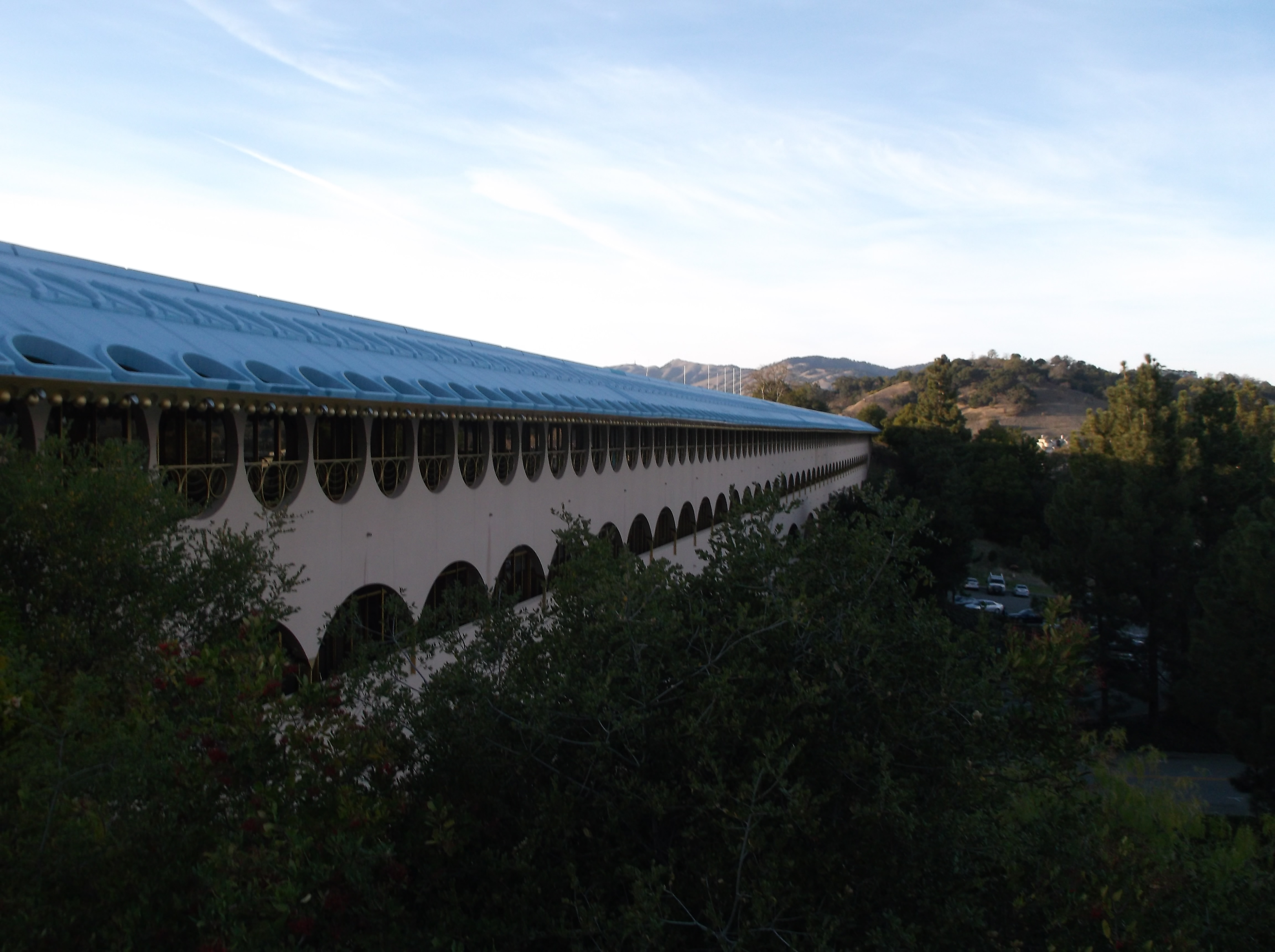
Marin County Civic Center building

Kaiser Hospital and clinic, a major facility in the Kaiser Permanente network, and one of the major full-service hospitals in the North Bay area, sits on the hill on the south side of Terra Linda.

Nearby on the opposite side of U.S. Highway 101 is the landmark Marin County Civic Center building, designed by Frank Lloyd Wright.

== Notoriety ==
In 1975, Terra Linda was the site of a notorious murder case, subsequently dubbed the "Barbecue Murders" or "BBQ Murders" by the local and national press. On the afternoon of June 21, 1975, 16-year-old Marlene Olive and her 20-year-old boyfriend, Charles "Chuck" Riley, murdered Marlene's adoptive parents, James and Naomi Olive, in the Olive residence on Hibiscus Way, and then burned the bodies in a firepit at nearby China Camp State Park. The couple was arrested on June 28 after Marlene Olive gave police conflicting and confusing accounts of her missing parents' whereabouts. After being taken into custody, Riley confessed to the murders.

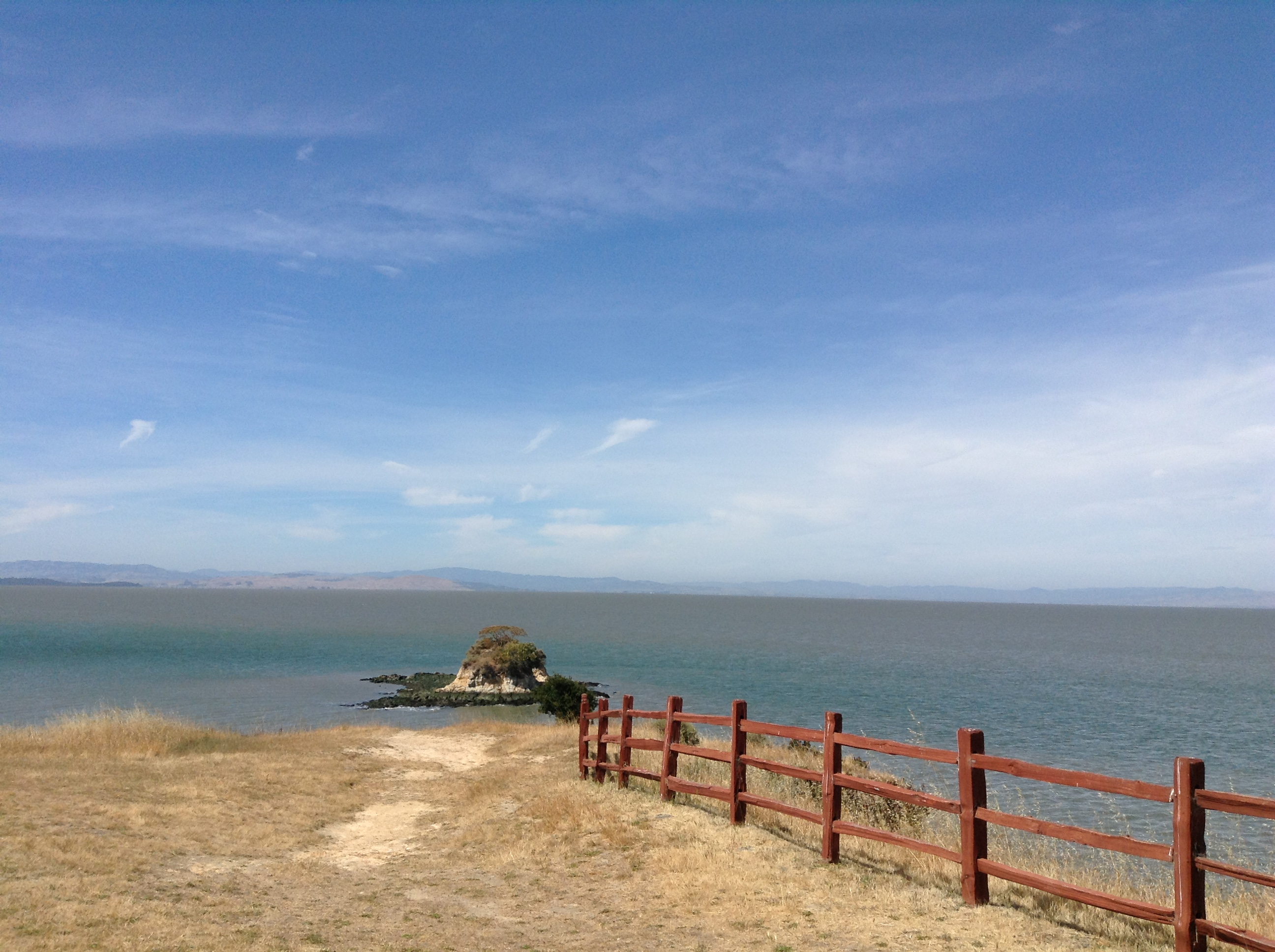
The picnic area at China Camp in San Rafael looking out at Island

In late 1975, after a seven-week trial, Riley, tried as an adult, was found guilty of bludgeoning Naomi Olive to death with a hammer, then shooting James Olive at close range as he arrived home and discovered the body of his mortally wounded wife. Riley was sentenced to death, which was commuted to life in prison when the death penalty was ruled unconstitutional in 1978. He was paroled from prison on December 8, 2015. Marlene Olive, after a short hearing in Marin County juvenile court, was ordered to serve approximately four years at Ventura School, the California Youth Authority's juvenile facility north of Los Angeles. The crime, ensuing trial, and aftermath are the subject of Richard M. Levine's 1982 book, Bad Blood: A Family Murder in Marin County.

== Notable residents ==
- Joseph Alessi, a 1977 graduate of Terra Linda High School and a Juilliard-trained trombonist, Principal Trombone of the New York Philharmonic with a number of accomplishments and recordings
- Stacey Bailey, football player, graduated Terra Linda HS 1978, played college ball at San Jose State and went on to a career with the Atlanta Falcons from 1982 to 1990
- Alvah Bessie, noted Hollywood screenwriter and author blacklisted during the McCarthy era, died in Terra Linda in 1985.
- Ann Curtis Cuneo, multiple gold medal-winning U.S. Olympic swimmer, operated the private Ann Curtis Swim Club and swim team in Terra Linda for 20 years
- Susan DeMattei, mountain biker who won the bronze medal in Mountain Biking at the 1996 Olympic Games in Atlanta, Georgia, was born and raised in nearby San Rafael
- Rick DeMont, swimmer, gold medal winner at the 1972 Olympics whose medal was revoked when the U.S. Olympic Committee failed to notify the IOC that Rick was taking asthma medicine that caused ephedrine to show up in a drug test, attended Terra Linda High School and graduated in 1973
- Michael Gold, novelist, author of the famous Depression era semi-autobiographical novel Jews Without Money.
- James Hetfield, vocalist and rhythm guitarist of the thrash metal band Metallica, moved to Terra Linda [approx. 2009] after residing for years in nearby Novato
- Bill Lee, MLB pitcher with the Boston Red Sox and the Montreal Expos, graduated from Terra Linda High School in 1964
