= Santa Venetia, California =

Santa Venetia
- Census-designated place
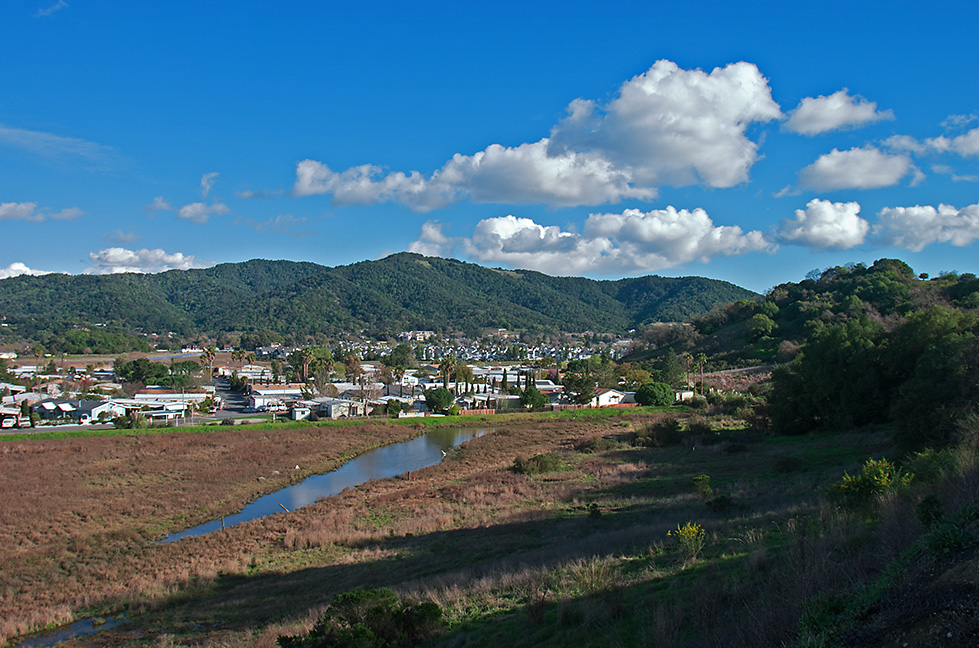
- Santa Venetia as seen from Terra Linda

- Location in Marin County and the state of California

- Location in the United States
- Coordinates: 37°59′55″N 122°31′31″W
- Country: United States
- State: California
- County: Marin

Government
  - County Board: District 1 Mary Sackett
  - State Senate: Mike McGuire (D)
  - Assembly: Damon Connolly (D)
  - U. S. Congress: Jared Huffman (D)

Area
  - Total: 3.693 sq mi (9.56 km^{2})
  - Land: 3.664 sq mi (9.49 km^{2})
  - Water: 0.029 sq mi (0.075 km^{2}) 0.79%
- Elevation: 56 ft (17 m)

Population (2020)
  - Total: 4,289
  - Density: 1,171/sq mi (452.0/km^{2})
- Time zone: UTC-8 (PST)
  - Summer (DST): UTC-7 (PDT)
- ZIP code: 94903
- Area codes: 415/628
- FIPS code: 06-70154
- GNIS feature ID: 1659603

Santa Venetia is a census-designated place (CDP) in Marin County, California, United States. It is located 1.5 miles (2.4 km) north of downtown San Rafael, at an elevation of 56 feet (17 m). The population was 4,289 at the 2020 census.

== Geography ==
Santa Venetia is located in eastern Marin County at 37°59′55″N 122°31′31″W. It is bordered to the south and west by the city of San Rafael (the county seat) and to the east by San Pablo Bay, the northern part of the San Francisco Bay estuary. Gallinas Creek forms the northern edge of the community, and the eastern part of the CDP is occupied by China Camp State Park.

According to the United States Census Bureau, the CDP has a total area of 3.7 square miles (9.6 km^{2}), of which 0.03 square miles (0.08 km^{2}), or 0.79%, are water.

The main road of the community is North San Pedro Road, which passes by the Frank Lloyd Wright-designed Marin County Civic Center. The road runs east through China Camp State Park, along the bay through Peacock Gap, and ends in San Rafael. Santa Venetia has an open space preserve for its marsh as it borders San Pablo Bay.

== History ==
Santa Venetia is built on marshland that was filled in 1914. At that time, real estate developer Mabry McMahan envisioned a bayside luxury development modeled after Venice, Italy. Venice is known as "Venezia" in Italian; however, there is no actual Christian saint ("Santa") named Venice or Venetia. The development was designed to be complete with canals and gondolas. The economic decline following the First World War put an end to the project.

It was only after the Second World War that significant development took place in Santa Venetia, with suburban developments such as Gallinas Village being built on the land originally filled in 1914.

Santa Venetia was home to the local YMCA until it was destroyed by a fire in 1986. Eventually the property was purchased by a developer who erected residential houses that were completed in 1987.

During the 1960s and 1970s the area was known affectionately to residents, especially teenagers, as "Lower Scabo" and "Upper Scabo".

Today Santa Venetia is a quiet neighborhood with a rural feel. Residents treasure its proximity to China Camp State Park, and many homes along the canal have water access.

== Demographics ==
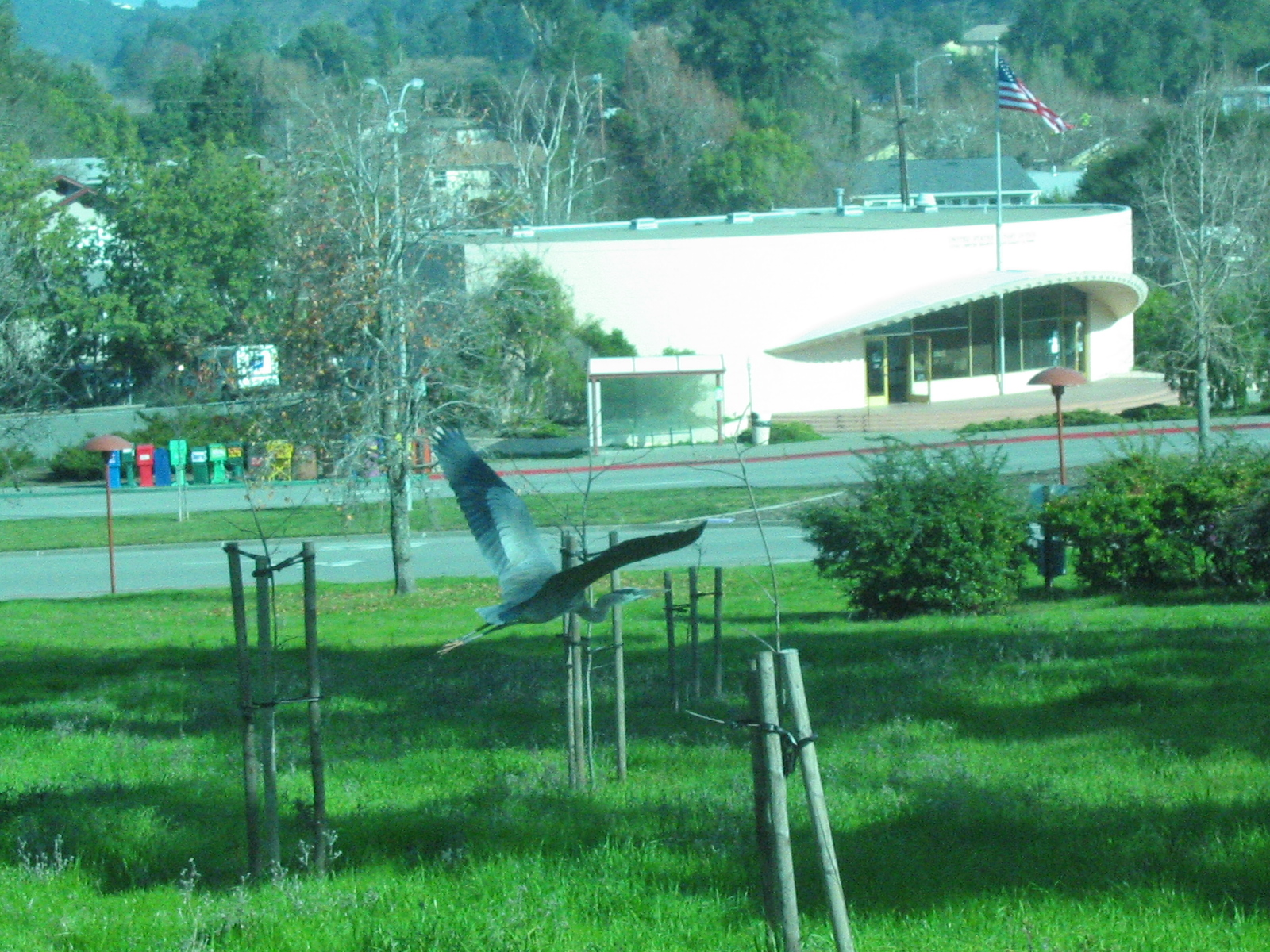
A heron flies by the Marin Post Office in Santa Venetia

Historical population
Census	Pop.	Note	%±
1990	3,362		—
2000	4,298		27.8%
2010	4,292		−0.1%
2020	4,289		−0.1%
U.S. Decennial Census; 1860–1870 1880-1890; 1900 1910 1920; 1930 1940 1950; 1960 1970 1980; 1990 2000 2010; 2020

Santa Venetia first appeared as a census designated place in the 1990 U.S. census.

=== Racial and ethnic composition ===
Santa Venetia CDP, California – Racial and ethnic composition Note: the US Census treats Hispanic/Latino as an ethnic category. This table excludes Latinos from the racial categories and assigns them to a separate category. Hispanics/Latinos may be of any race.
Race / Ethnicity (NH = Non-Hispanic)	Pop 2000	Pop 2010	Pop 2020	% 2000	% 2010	% 2020
White alone (NH)	3,256	2,941	2,647	75.76%	68.52%	61.72%
Black or African American alone (NH)	91	85	63	2.12%	1.98%	1.47%
Native American or Alaska Native alone (NH)	20	8	9	0.47%	0.19%	0.21%
Asian alone (NH)	256	302	329	5.96%	7.04%	7.67%
Native Hawaiian or Pacific Islander alone (NH)	8	15	6	0.19%	0.35%	0.14%
Other race alone (NH)	11	14	41	0.26%	0.33%	0.96%
Mixed race or Multiracial (NH)	138	112	191	3.21%	2.61%	4.45%
Hispanic or Latino (any race)	518	815	1,003	12.05%	18.99%	23.39%
Total	4,298	4,292	4,289	100.00%	100.00%	100.00%

=== 2020 census ===
As of the 2020 census, Santa Venetia had a population of 4,289 and a population density of 1,170.6 inhabitants per square mile (452.0/km^{2}).

The census reported that 96.2% of the population lived in households, 1.3% lived in non-institutionalized group quarters, and 2.6% were institutionalized. 98.2% of residents lived in urban areas, while 1.8% lived in rural areas.

There were 1,647 households, out of which 25.0% had children under the age of 18. Of all households, 49.2% were married-couple households, 6.3% were cohabiting couple households, 29.5% had a female householder with no spouse or partner present, and 15.0% had a male householder with no spouse or partner present. 28.5% of households were one person, and 18.3% were one person aged 65 or older. The average household size was 2.5. There were 1,035 families (62.8% of all households).

The age distribution was 16.7% under the age of 18, 5.7% aged 18 to 24, 20.4% aged 25 to 44, 30.0% aged 45 to 64, and 27.2% who were 65 years of age or older. The median age was 50.2 years. For every 100 females, there were 90.5 males, and for every 100 females age 18 and over there were 87.0 males.

There were 1,707 housing units at an average density of 465.9 units per square mile (179.9 units/km^{2}), of which 1,647 (96.5%) were occupied. Of these, 72.0% were owner-occupied, and 28.0% were occupied by renters. 3.5% of housing units were vacant. The homeowner vacancy rate was 0.5% and the rental vacancy rate was 3.1%.

=== Income and poverty ===
In 2023, the US Census Bureau estimated that the median household income was $138,085, and the per capita income was $74,385. About 2.7% of families and 4.2% of the population were below the poverty line.

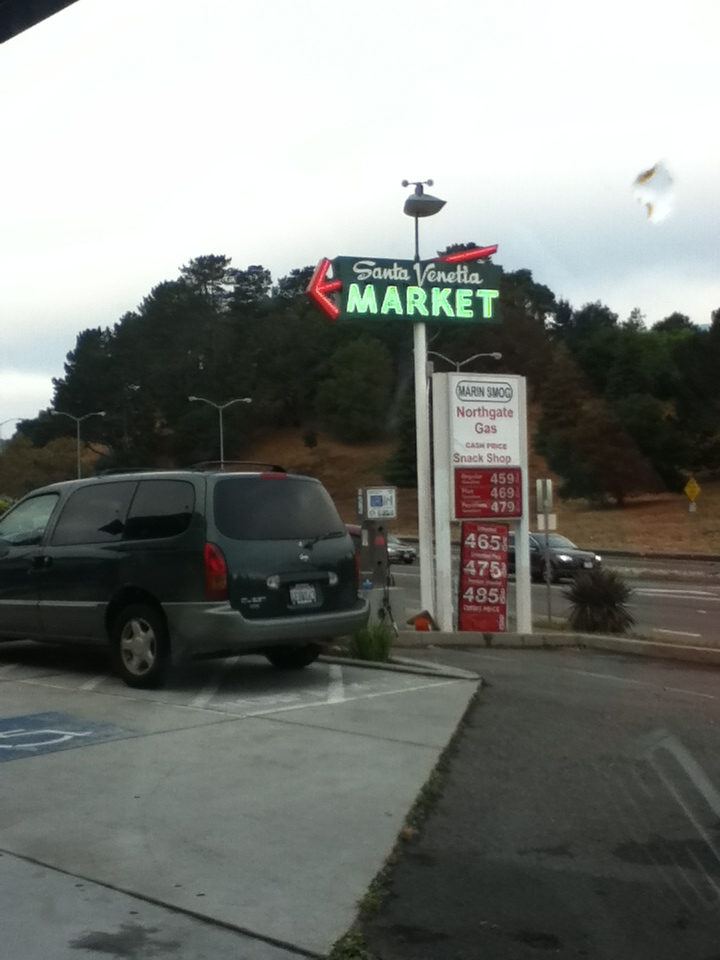
Santa Venetia market in Marin County

=== 2010 census ===
At the 2010 census Santa Venetia had a population of 4,292. The population density was 1,166.3 inhabitants per square mile (450.3/km^{2}). The racial makeup of Santa Venetia was 3,335 (77.7%) White, 88 (2.1%) African American, 27 (0.6%) Native American, 306 (7.1%) Asian, 16 (0.4%) Pacific Islander, 350 (8.2%) from other races, and 170 (4.0%) from two or more races. Hispanic or Latino of any race were 815 people (19.0%).

The census reported that 4,080 people (95.1% of the population) lived in households, 65 (1.5%) lived in non-institutionalized group quarters, and 147 (3.4%) were institutionalized.

There were 1,655 households, 480 (29.0%) had children under the age of 18 living in them, 769 (46.5%) were opposite-sex married couples living together, 180 (10.9%) had a female householder with no husband present, 81 (4.9%) had a male householder with no wife present. There were 87 (5.3%) unmarried opposite-sex partnerships, and 21 (1.3%) same-sex married couples or partnerships. 455 households (27.5%) were one person and 228 (13.8%) had someone living alone who was 65 or older. The average household size was 2.47. There were 1,030 families (62.2% of households); the average family size was 2.97.

The age distribution was 802 people (18.7%) under the age of 18, 220 people (5.1%) aged 18 to 24, 961 people (22.4%) aged 25 to 44, 1,435 people (33.4%) aged 45 to 64, and 874 people (20.4%) who were 65 or older. The median age was 47.7 years. For every 100 females, there were 90.2 males. For every 100 females age 18 and over, there were 87.1 males.

There were 1,706 housing units at an average density of 463.6 per square mile, of the occupied units 1,188 (71.8%) were owner-occupied and 467 (28.2%) were rented. The homeowner vacancy rate was 1.1%; the rental vacancy rate was 2.1%. 2,925 people (68.2% of the population) lived in owner-occupied housing units and 1,155 people (26.9%) lived in rental housing units.

== Education ==
Residents are in both the San Rafael Elementary School District and the San Rafael High School District, jointly operated as San Rafael City Schools.

Venetia Valley K-8 School is the K-8 school serving the community. Residents may choose either San Rafael High School or Terra Linda High School.

== Notable residents ==
- Science fiction author Philip K. Dick lived in Santa Venetia from 1967 to 1972. During this time, Dick was using methamphetamine and other drugs quite heavily, living semi-communally with a rotating group of mostly teenage drug users. His experiences during this time formed much of the basis for his novel A Scanner Darkly.
- Charles "Chuck" Riley, one of the two perpetrators of the 1975 "BBQ murders", lived in Santa Venetia up until the time of his arrest and eventual imprisonment. Riley and his girlfriend Marlene Olive murdered her adoptive parents, James and Naomi Olive, in Terra Linda and disposed of the bodies by burning them in a firepit in nearby China Camp State Park.

== Santa Venetia Neighborhood Association ==
The SVNA is an active neighborhood association. It describes its mission as "preserv[ing] and promot[ing] the quality of life in the Santa Venetia community". This is achieved by "encouraging healthy social interaction; facilitating the flow of information; and protecting the natural beauty and economic well-being of the community".

The SVNA holds regular community meetings, hosts social events and neighborhood work days and publishes a bi-monthly newsletter.
