= KSRH =

Radio station at San Rafael High School in San Rafael, California

Coordinates: 37.971°N 122.514°W

- San Rafael, California; United States
- Broadcast area: San Francisco Bay Area
- Frequency: 88.1 (MHz)
- Branding: KSRH 88.1 FM

Programming
- Format: Grade School (K-12)

Ownership
- Owner: San Rafael High School

History
- Call sign meaning: K San Rafael High

Technical information
- Licensing authority: FCC
- Class: D
- ERP: 7 watts
- HAAT: 20 meters

Links
- Public license information: Public file; LMS

KSRH ("The Sound Difference") is a low power non-commercial radio station licensed to San Rafael, CA, broadcasting on 88.1 FM. The station is owned and operated by San Rafael High School, and is operated by high school students. All of KSRH's funding comes from the San Rafael School District. The station also airs PSAs (Public Service Announcements) which are broadcast at no charge per FCC law.

KSRH's signal can be received in the neighborhoods of Downtown San Rafael, the Canal Area, Gerstle Park, and in Sun Valley. Its signal is 7 watts and is contained by the geography of San Rafael (with steep hills on three sides, and the San Francisco Bay on the fourth). KSRH's transmitting tower is 59 feet tall, and attached to the main building at San Rafael High School, which is 23 feet above sea level.

As of the 2011 school year, KSRH is transmitting only pre-recorded shows due to changes to the class, but the station still broadcasts 24 hours a day.

Each DJ is responsible for the content of their show, and several of the shows have unique names and themes.

Alleged domestic terrorist Daniel Andreas San Diego is an alumnus of KSRH.
