= Scott Trimble =

American location scout (born 1977)

- Born: Scott Thomas Suggs Trimble; April 15, 1977 (age 48); San Francisco, California, U.S.
- Education: Terra Linda High School
- Alma mater: University of California, Berkeley (1999, B.A. Anthropology)
- Occupations: location scout, location manager
- Parent(s): Tom Trimble; Gail Trimble
- Relatives: Barack Obama (distant cousin); Clarence Nash (fourth cousin, twice removed); Jonathan Singletary Dunham (ancestor); Charles Darnton (great-granduncle)

Scott Thomas Suggs Trimble (born April 15, 1977) is an American location scout and location manager who found locations seen in such projects as Star Trek, Terminator: The Sarah Connor Chronicles, Star Tours II, and Iron Man 2. He won awards for his work on the films Transformers and Mission: Impossible III. He is a founding member of the Location Managers Guild of America.

== Personal life ==
Trimble was born in San Francisco, California, the son of Tom Trimble, an emergency room nurse, and Gail Trimble, a champion rose grower. He is the fourth cousin twice removed of Clarence Nash, the longtime voice of Donald Duck. He is also the great-grandnephew of Charles Darnton, a silent film screenwriter for the Fox Film Corporation in the 1920s. He is also a direct descendant of settler Jonathan Singletary Dunham, thus making him a distant cousin of Barack Obama.

Trimble became an Eagle Scout in 1993. He graduated from Terra Linda High School in San Rafael, California, in 1995 and, in 1999, graduated with a B.A. in Anthropology from the University of California at Berkeley.

He is an active participant in the science and skepticism communities. He is a member of the James Randi Educational Foundation and he has lent his film industry skills to such TV shows as Ripley's Believe It or Not!, MythBusters, and The Skeptologists.

== Location work ==
Trimble has scouted or managed locations for over 85 feature films, 40 television commercials, and 30 television series. He has been a location scout on many projects from filmmaker J. J. Abrams, including Mission: Impossible – Ghost Protocol, Super 8, Star Trek, Anatomy of Hope, Mission: Impossible III, and Alias.

Some of Trimble's other film location credits include The Cabin in the Woods, Alvin and the Chipmunks, Hancock, Rocky Balboa, Alpha Dog, 50 First Dates, and The Princess Diaries. He has also done location work for such television shows as FlashForward, Heroes, House, CSI: Miami, and Presidio Med.

== Other industry work ==
Trimble recently production managed a project for Universal Studios and he was the assistant production supervisor on Unstoppable. In years past, he had other production experience on movies like The Zodiac, High Crimes, Serendipity, and The Sweetest Thing. He was also a production assistant on The Matrix Reloaded and as Bedazzled.

== Other ventures ==
Trimble is the co-owner of Go For Locations Inc., a film industry company founded in 2004 and incorporated in 2007. This company provides equipment to shows like Brothers and Sisters, Monk, 24, CSI: Crime Scene Investigation, and Lie to Me. They also host the websites for shows like Dexter, Eli Stone, Hung, Big Love, and NCIS: Los Angeles. Some of their feature film credits include Eagle Eye, Transformers: Revenge of the Fallen, Zombieland, Thor and Marmaduke.

== Awards ==
At the annual California On Location Awards, Trimble has been nominated for seven awards and has won three of them. He won the Robin Eickman Memorial Mentorship Award for Location Professionals in 2003, as well as the Location Team of the Year for Features for Mission: Impossible III in 2006 and for Transformers in 2007. He was nominated for Location Team of the Year for Features for Hancock in 2008, and as Assistant Location Manager of the Year for Star Trek in 2008 and for Iron Man 2 in 2009.
