= Miller Creek Elementary School District =

School district in California

Address
- 380 Nova Albion Way San Rafael, California, 94903; United States

District information
- Type: Public
- Grades: K–8
- NCES District ID: 0611220

Students and staff
- Students: 1,754 (2021-22)
- Teachers: 91.0 (FTE)
- Staff: 146.55 (FTE)
- Student–teacher ratio: 20.44:1

Other information
- Website: www.millercreeksd.org

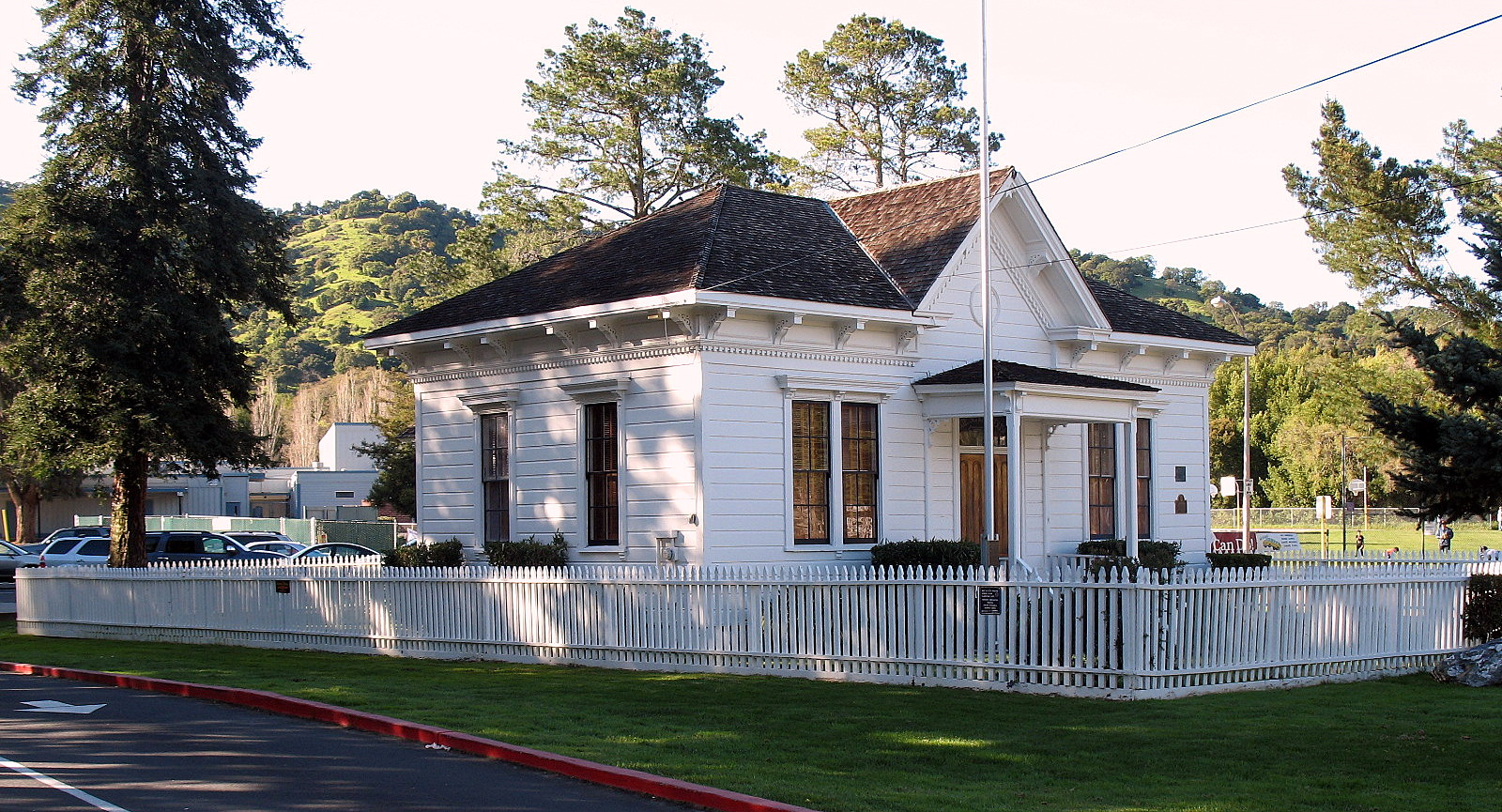
The Dixie Schoolhouse, located at Miller Creek Middle School

The Miller Creek Elementary School District, formerly the Dixie School District, is a school district located in San Rafael, California that operates four schools in the northern portion of the city: Mary E. Silveira Elementary School in the Marinwood area, Vallecito Elementary School in the Terra Linda area, Lucas Valley Elementary School, and Miller Creek Middle School in the Marinwood area. All four are California Distinguished Schools.

== History ==
The Miller Creek School District was named after a local creek and existing middle school. It was formerly named the Dixie School District after the Dixie Schoolhouse, a one-room schoolhouse built in 1864. The source of the name for the original school was in dispute and had been a source of community discussion.

The Dixie school board voted in April 2019 to form a committee to choose a new name as after considering the association with the 11 states in the South that seceded from the U.S. to form the Confederacy. Three board members voted in favor of changing the name, while one each voted against and did an abstention.

== Governance ==
The school board has five members. As of 2022, the current superintendent is Becky Rosales, former superintendent of the Waugh School District in Petaluma, who was appointed interim superintendent of Miller Creek days before the board voted to change the district name. Dr. Lustig Yamashiro (2017–2019) and Mr. Lohawasser (1997–2017) were the predecessors.

The district includes portions of San Rafael and all of Lucas Valley-Marinwood.

== Schools ==
=== Elementary Schools ===
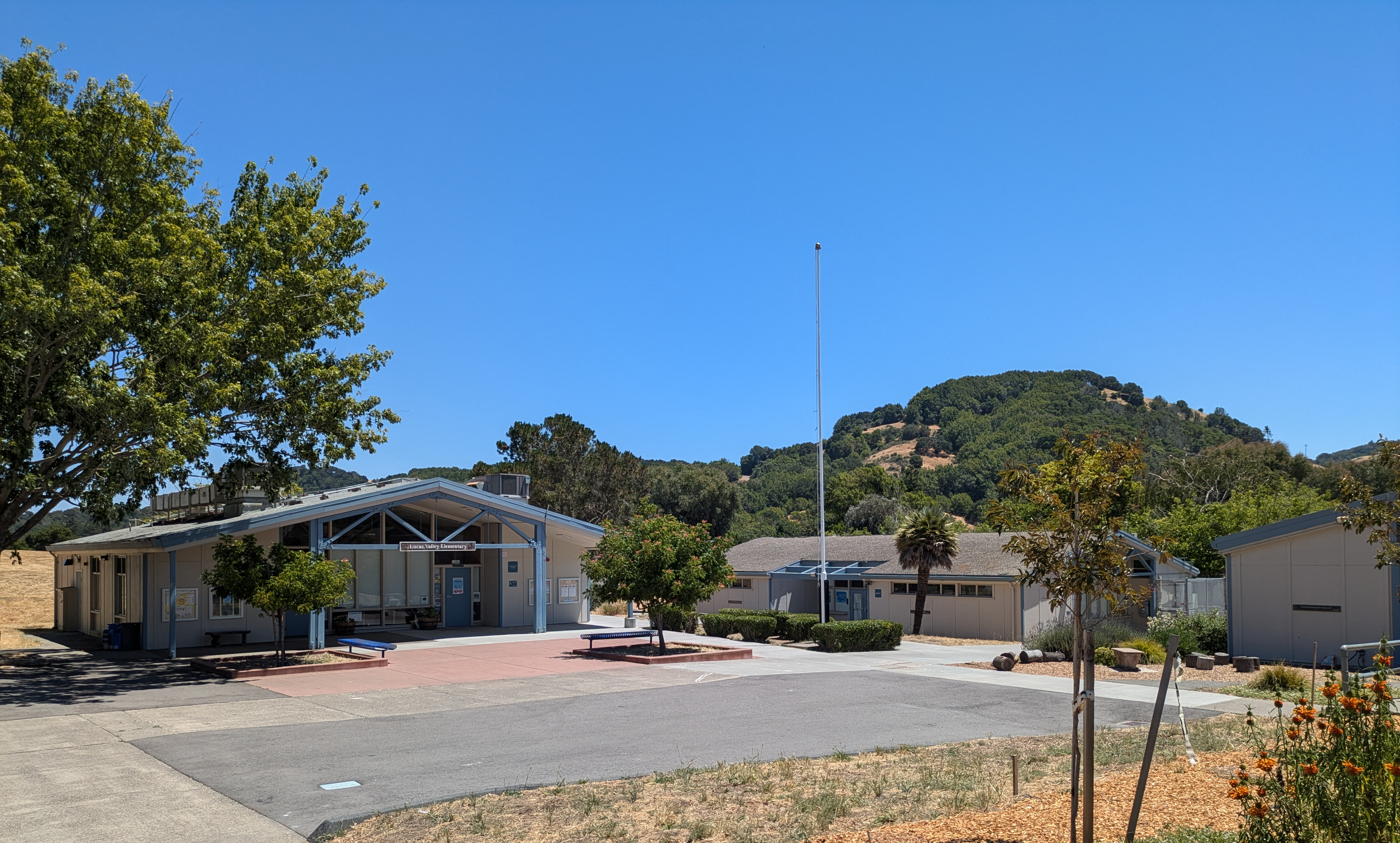
Lucas Valley Elementary School in 2024

Lucas Valley Elementary School was formerly Dixie Elementary School. The name change occurred at the time the district's name changed. During the 2021 to 2022 school year the elementary had 336 students with a 14.50 student to teacher ratio.

Vallecito Elementary School

Mary E. Silveira Elementary School

=== Middle School ===
The three elementary schools are feeder schools to Miller Creek Middle School. The middle school contains grades 6 through 8 and is one of the feeder middle schools to Terra Linda High School. Miller Creek's mascot is a black panther.

== See also ==
- San Rafael City Schools
