= Bobbyzio Moore =

American singer

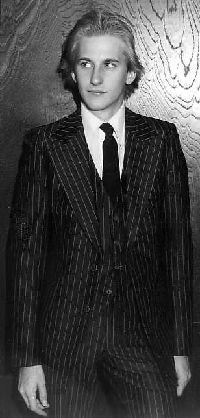
Bobbyzio Moore (1978)

Bobbyzio Moore (born in 1959 Minneapolis, Minnesota as Robert Eldon Arthur Moore), is a Saxophonist, Keyboardist, guitarist, Bass Guitarist, Vocalist, Songwriter and Arranger.

Bobbyzio grew up in Minneapolis where he pursued a recording career, with The Robert Moore Group, and Skogie. In 1976 he relocated to Hollywood, California. He co-founded the bands The Kats, The Nu Kats, Boy, with his brother Freddy Moore. In the 1980s Bobbyzio recorded as a session musician and received 2 Platinum Album Awards. In the 1990s he formed the band Bobbyzio to showcase his songwriting talent.

== Discography ==
- No Driving On Sundays – Starship Records by The Robert Moore Group – 1974
- L.A. In – (compilation) Rhino Records featuring The Kats – 1979
- Get Modern – Infinity Records by The Kats – 1979
- Plastic Facts – Rhino Records by The Nu Kats – 1980
- Yes Nukes – (compilation) Rhino Records featuring The Nu Kats – 1981
- Parasite – (Film Soundtrack) featuring Boy – 1982
- Next Door – RadioActive Records by Boy – 1983
- Scarred – (Film Soundtrack) featuring Boy/The Nu Kats – 1984
- Spring Fever – (Film Soundtrack) featuring The Nu Kats – 1985
- Loose Screws (Film Soundtrack) featuring – The Nu Kats – 1985
- Beverly Hills Cop (Film Soundtrack) – 1985
- Ghostbusters (Film Soundtrack) – 1984
- Home - Reprise by BoDeans – 1989

== Filmography ==
- I'm A Kat (1979) United Artists Pictures - Using an experimental 70mm 3D filming technique.
- It's Not A Rumor (1981) Director: Philip Brewin Cheney, Cinematographer: Jan de Bont.

== Videography ==
- Lost My TV Guide (1979) Hollywood Heartbeat - Pre-MTV rock television series.

== Related Web sites ==
- The Robert Moore Group
- Skogie
- The Kats
- The Nu Kats
- Boy
