= Dixie Schoolhouse =

- U.S. National Register of Historic Places
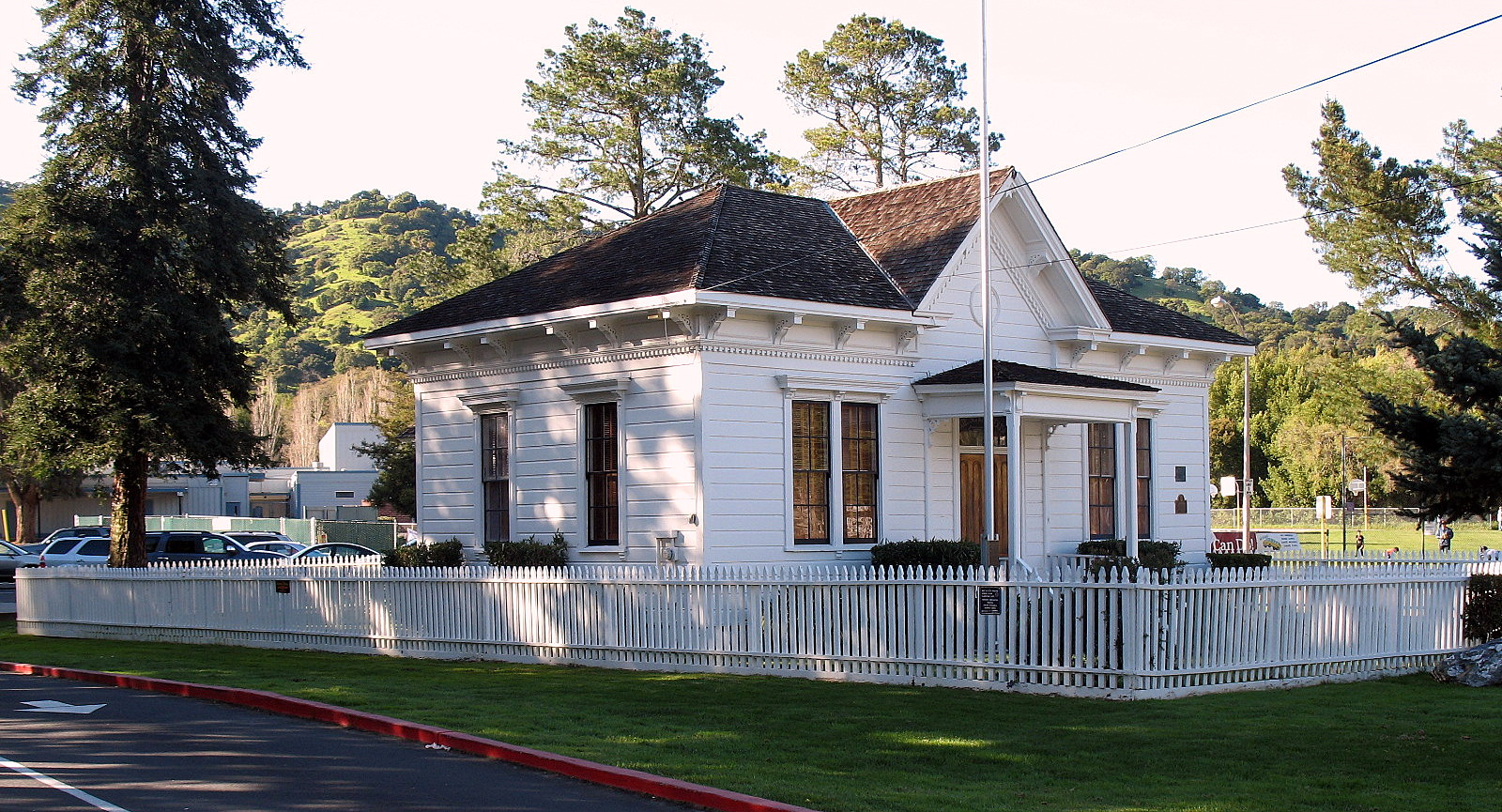

- Location within California Location within the United States
- Location: 2255 Las Gallinas Ave, San Rafael, California
- Coordinates: 38°1′45.65″N 122°32′46.29″W
- Built: 1864
- Architectural style: Italianate
- NRHP reference No.: 72000236
- Added to NRHP: December 26, 1972

The Dixie Schoolhouse is a historic one-room schoolhouse located in San Rafael, Marin County, Northern California. It was built in 1864, in the Victorian Italianate style.

== History ==
The school was the project of Irish immigrant and Marin County pioneer James S. Miller (1812–1890). A few traditions attempt to explain why Miller selected the name "Dixie", a nickname for the Southern United States. Some say the schoolhouse was built by Southern carpenters, while others believe the name honors Mary Dixie, a local Indian woman; still others believe that "Dixie" is derived from the French word for "ten".

The school was in use for classes from 1864 until 1958. The Dixie School District (now the Miller Creek Elementary School District) got its name from this first school. The school district changed its name in 2020 after considering the association with the 11 states in the South that seceded from the U.S. to form the Confederacy.

In June 1971, the schoolhouse was moved to its current location, near Miller Creek Middle School, also in San Rafael. It was restored and renovated prior to being listed on the National Register of Historic Places in 1972.

== Museum ==
The school is currently preserved by the Old Dixie School Foundation, and is open to the public for visits on the first Sunday of every month from 2-4 P.M.

== See also ==
- National Register of Historic Places listings in Marin County, California
- Murphy family, James S. Miller's in-laws

== Gallery ==
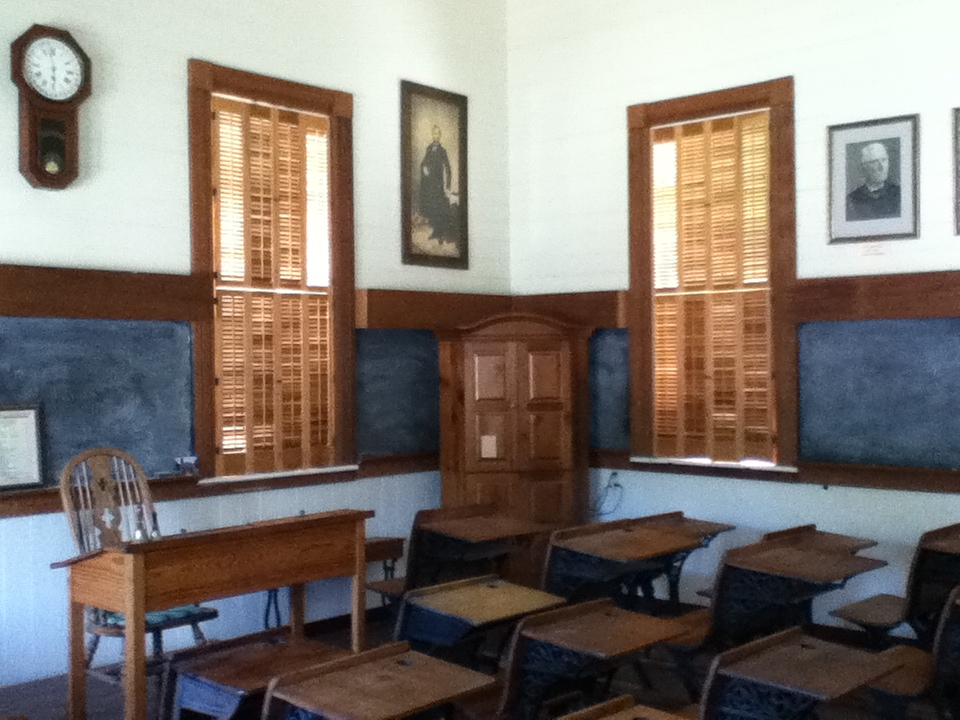
One-room schoolhouse interior

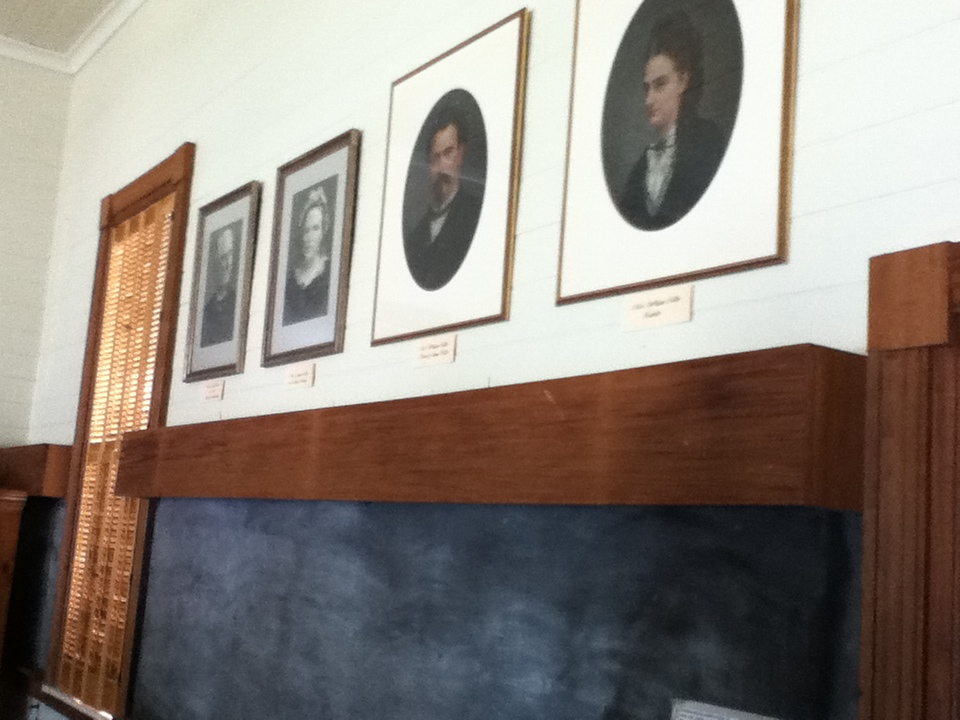
Classroom interior

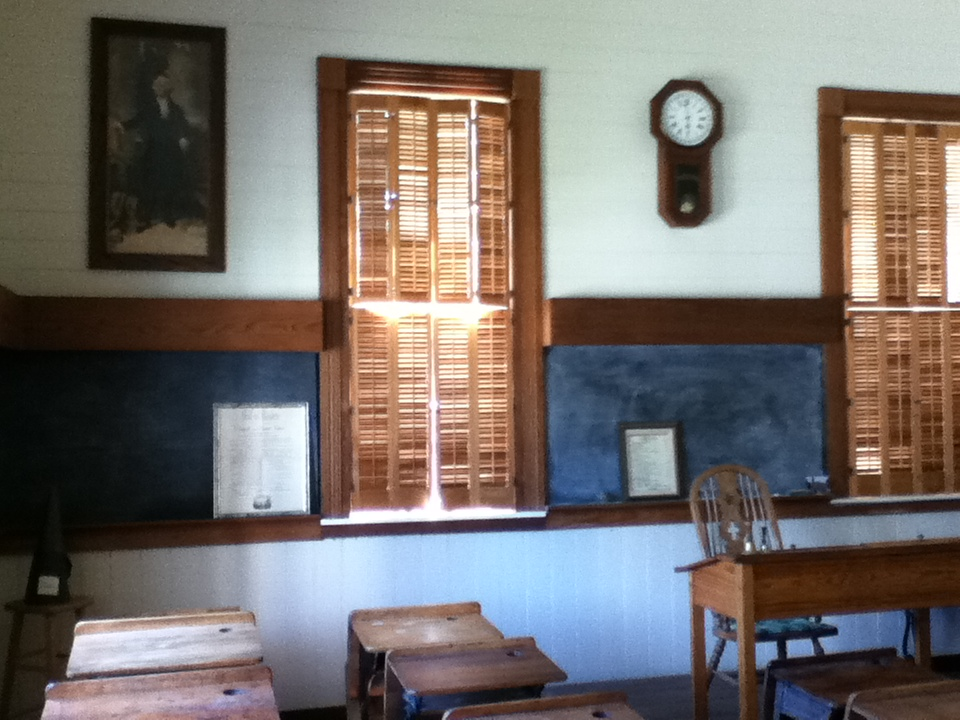
Classroom interior

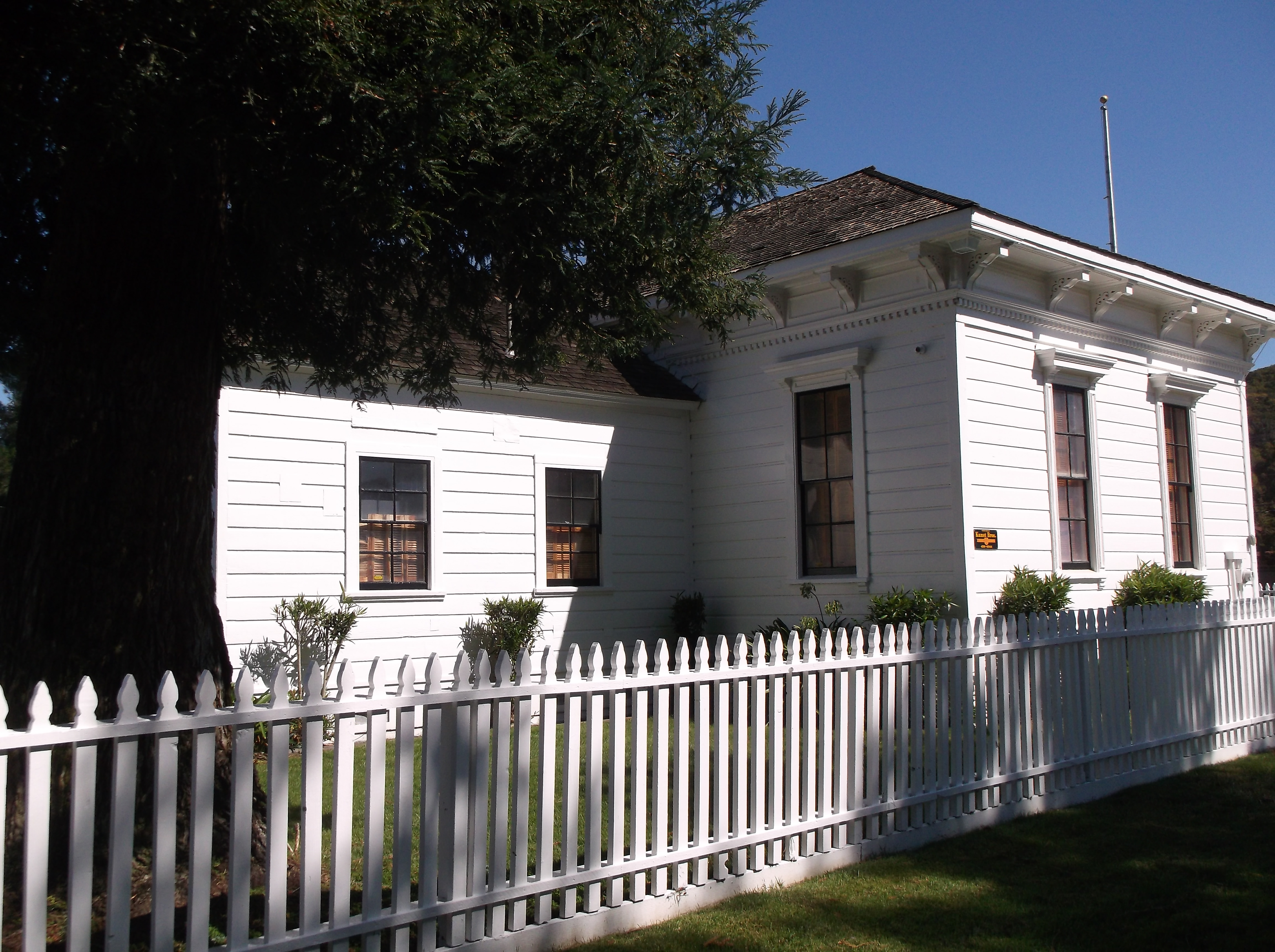
Dixie schoolhouse from the side

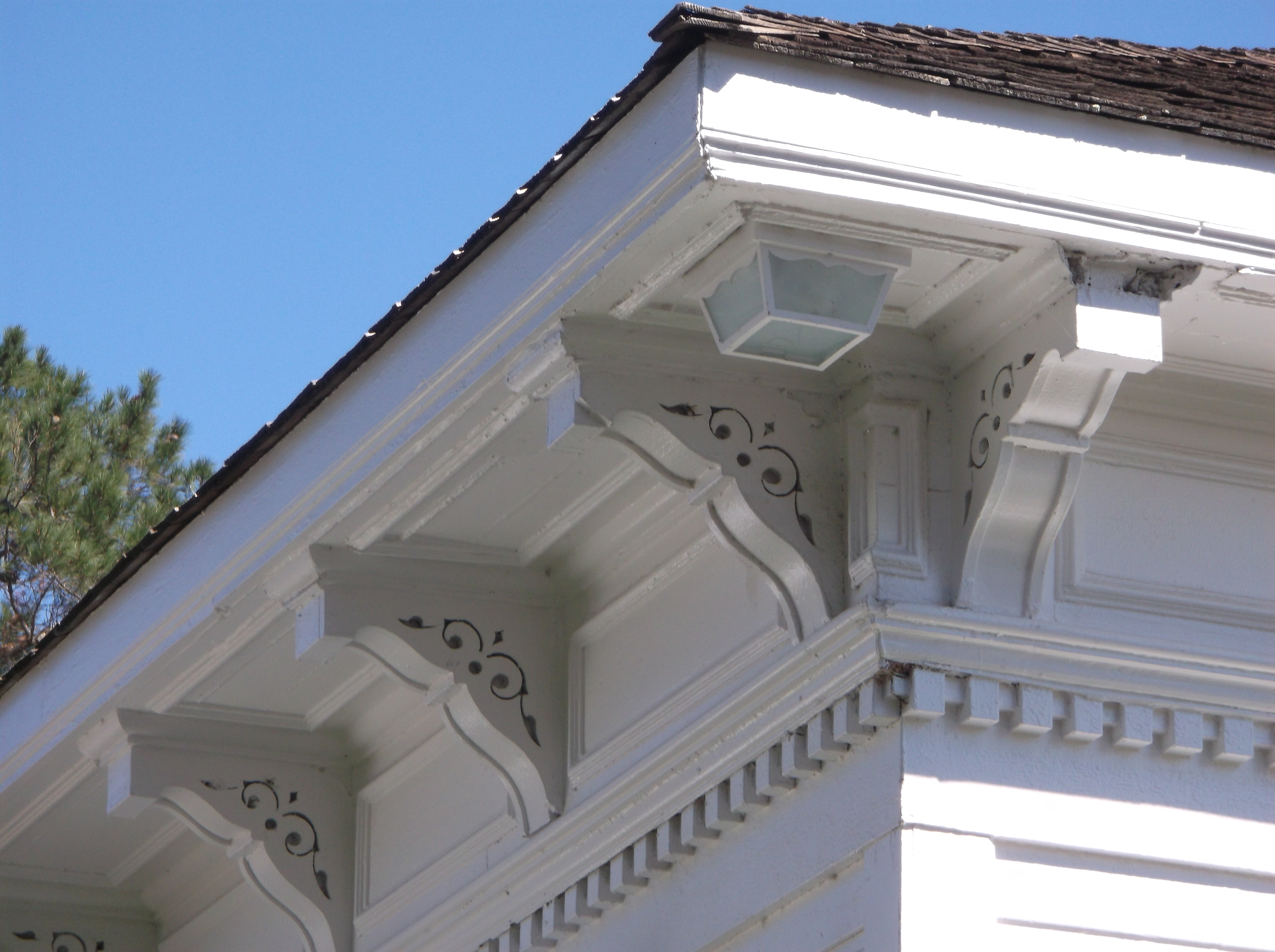
Ornamentation on Dixie schoolhouse

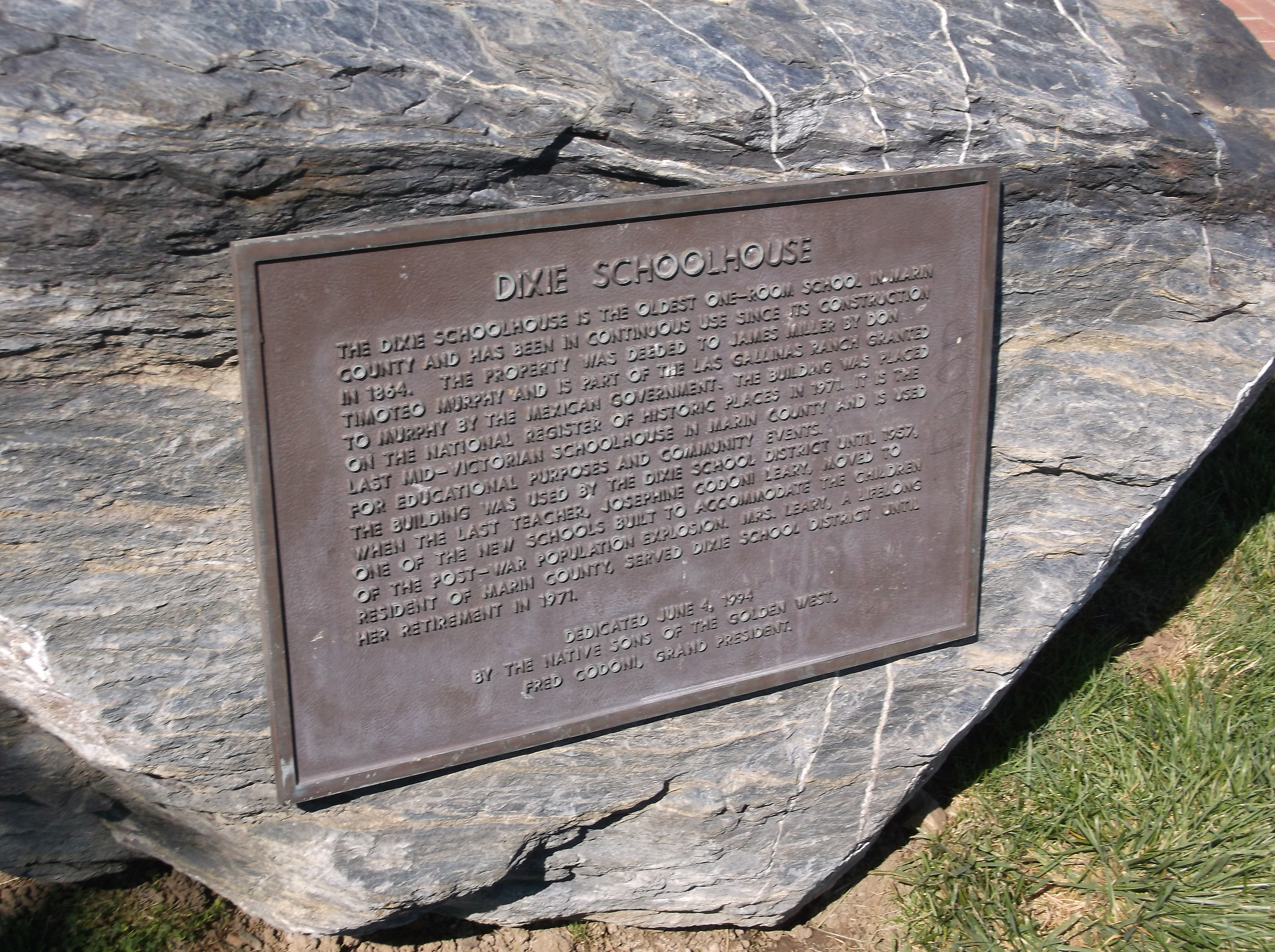
Dixie Schoolhouse plaque

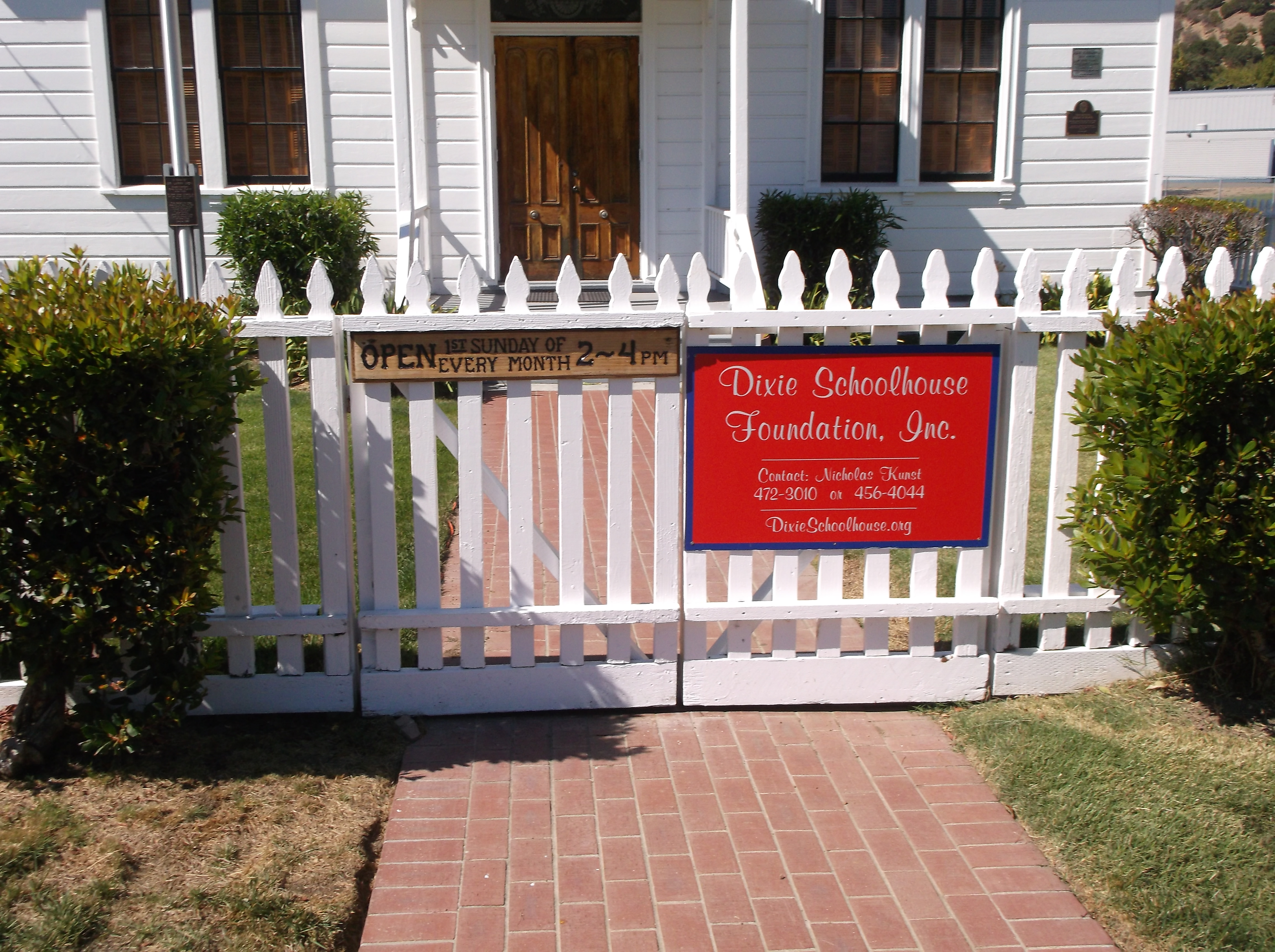
Front gate to Dixie Schoolhouse

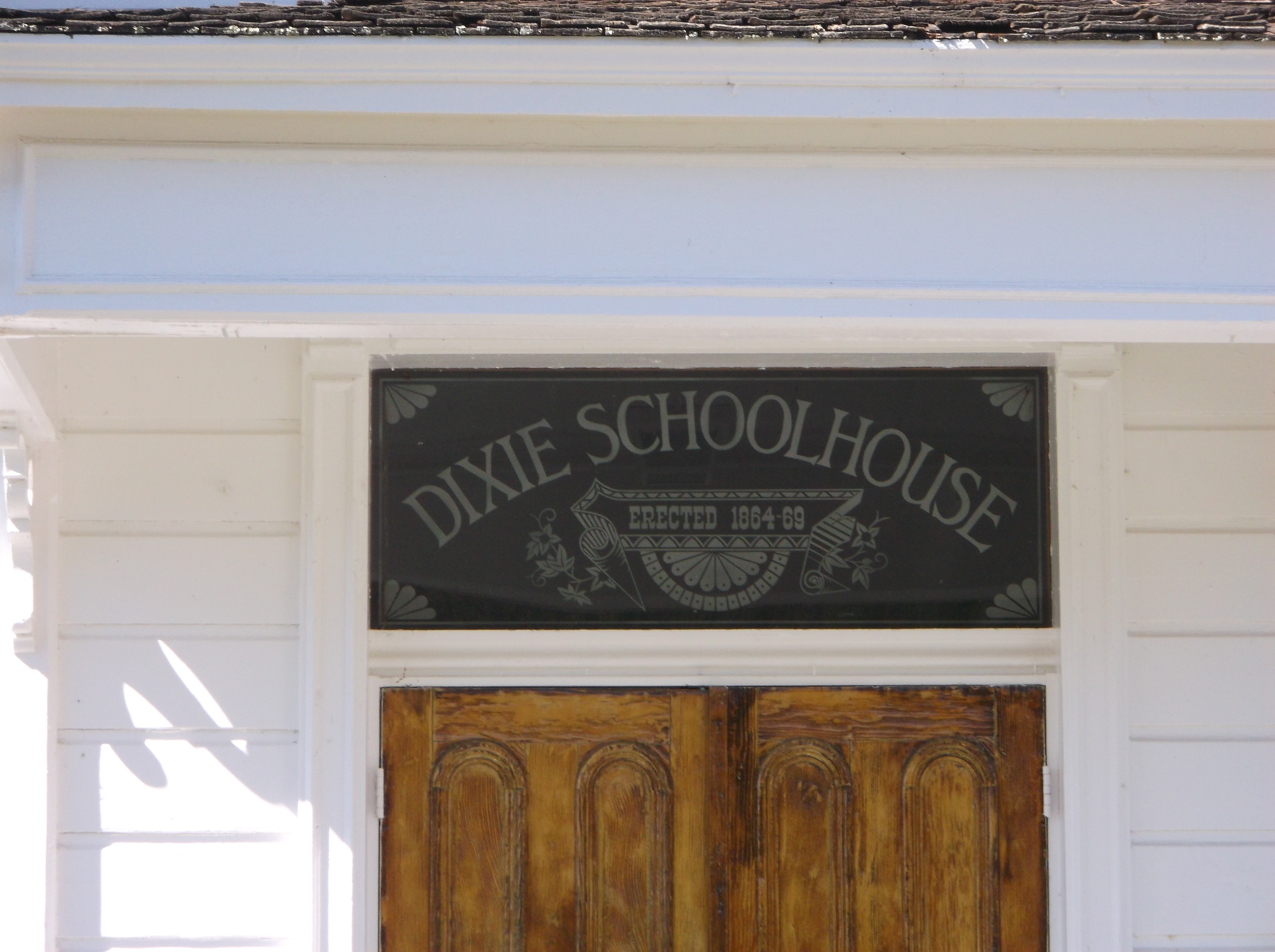
Dixie Schoolhouse sign over door
