= Terra Linda High School =

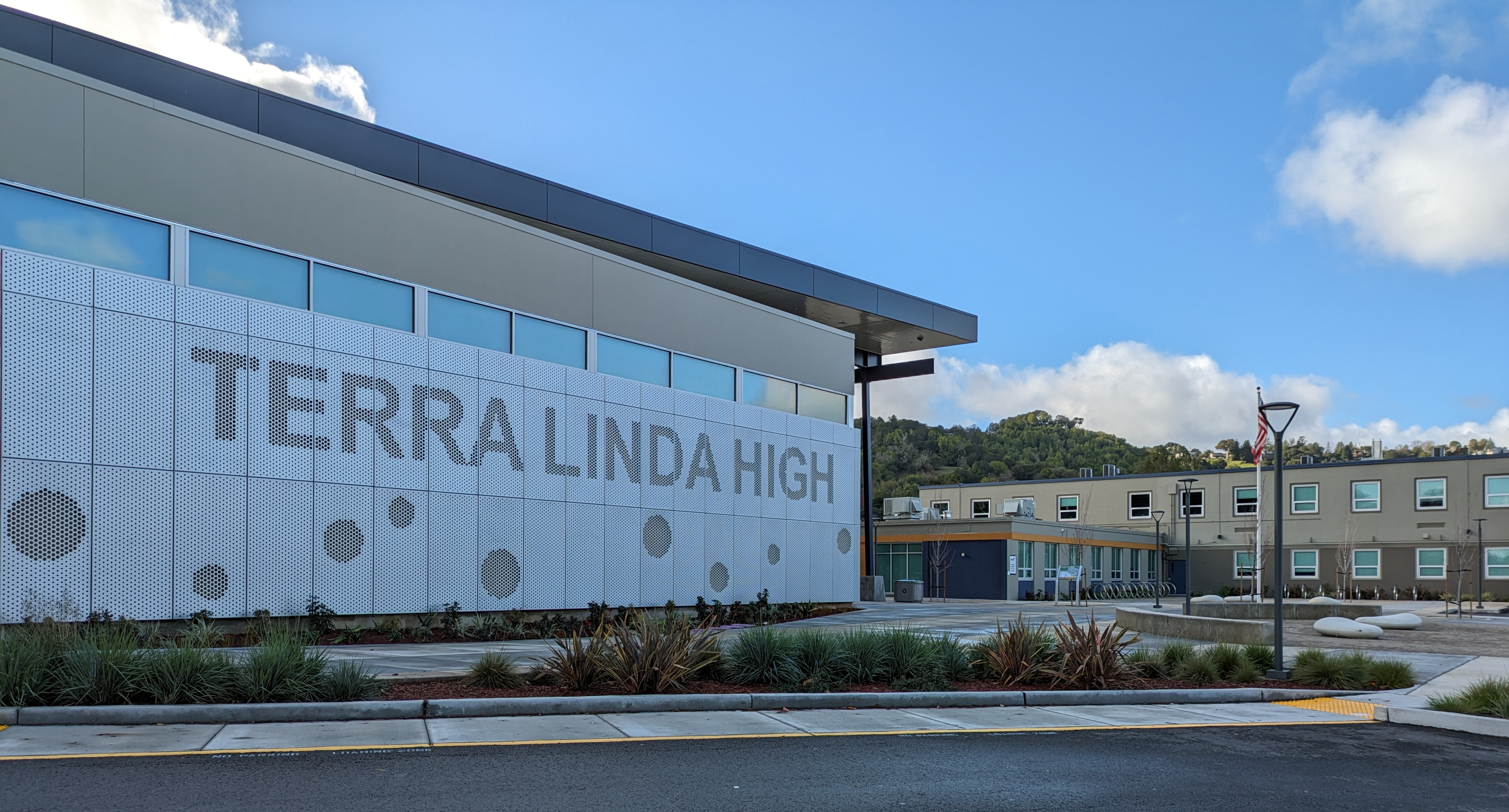
- The school in 2023

Location
- 320 Nova Albion Way; San Rafael, California 94903; United States
- Coordinates: 38.000415°N 122.554177°W

Information
- School type: Public, Parcel tax, high school
- Established: 1960
- School board: San Rafael City Schools Board of Education
- Oversight: Western Assn of Schools and Colleges, Accrediting Commission for Schools
- Principal: Katy Dunlap
- Grades: 9–12
- Enrollment: 1,205 (2023–2024)
  - Grade 9: 308
  - Grade 10: 271
  - Grade 11: 320
  - Grade 12: 306
- Language: English
- Campus: Suburban
- Colors: Blue and Gold
- Mascot: Trojan
- Team name: Trojans
- Communities served: San Rafael, Lucas Valley, Marinwood, Santa Venetia
- Feeder schools: Miller Creek Elementary School District; *Miller Creek Middle School; *Lucas Valley Elementary School; *Mary E. Silveira Elementary School; *Vallecito Elementary School; San Rafael City Schools; *Davidson Middle School; *Venetia Valley School
- Affiliation: none
- Website: http://terralinda.srcs.org/
- San Rafael City Schools, Our Schools

Terra Linda High School (also known as TLHS and more commonly known as TL) is a public secondary school located in Terra Linda, San Rafael, California, United States. In 2006, it was named a California Distinguished School. The school is part of the San Rafael City Schools school district. The official school mascot is the Trojan.

Residents of the high school district may choose either Terra Linda High or San Rafael High School. The high school district includes San Rafael, Santa Venetia, Lucas Valley-Marinwood, and a portion of Larkspur.

== History ==
Terra Linda High School was established in 1960 in its current location on 320 Nova Albion Way.

== Athletics ==
In 2004, Terra Linda High School's varsity football team was the NCS 2A Redwood Empire Football Champion. In 2018, the varsity football team won the MCAL title and won their first round NCS game against Pinole Valley High School.

Terra Linda Football dominated the MCAL under Coach Don Lucas from 1966 to 1980; winning ten league titles and the NCS 3A division in 1979 and 1980. The '79 team featured a veer offense and a stout 4-3 defense that allowed only 2 touchdowns all year. The 1980 Trojans did a repeat and won the NCS 3A Championship against El Molino on Quagmire Bailey Field in Santa Rosa.

The men's soccer program won the 2014 NCS title, the 2015-16 MCAL title and 2019-20 MCAL title.

The women's golf team won the 2017, 2018, and 2019 MCAL titles.

== Demographics ==
2019–2020

- 1,361 students: 741 male (54.4%), 620 female (45.6%)

White	Hispanic	Asian	African American	Two or More Races	Filipino	American Indian	Pacific Islander	Not Reported
545	648	82	22	46	<10	<10	<10	<10
40%	47.6%	6%	1.6%	3.4%	<0.7%	<0.7%	<0.7%	<0.7%

== Notable alumni ==
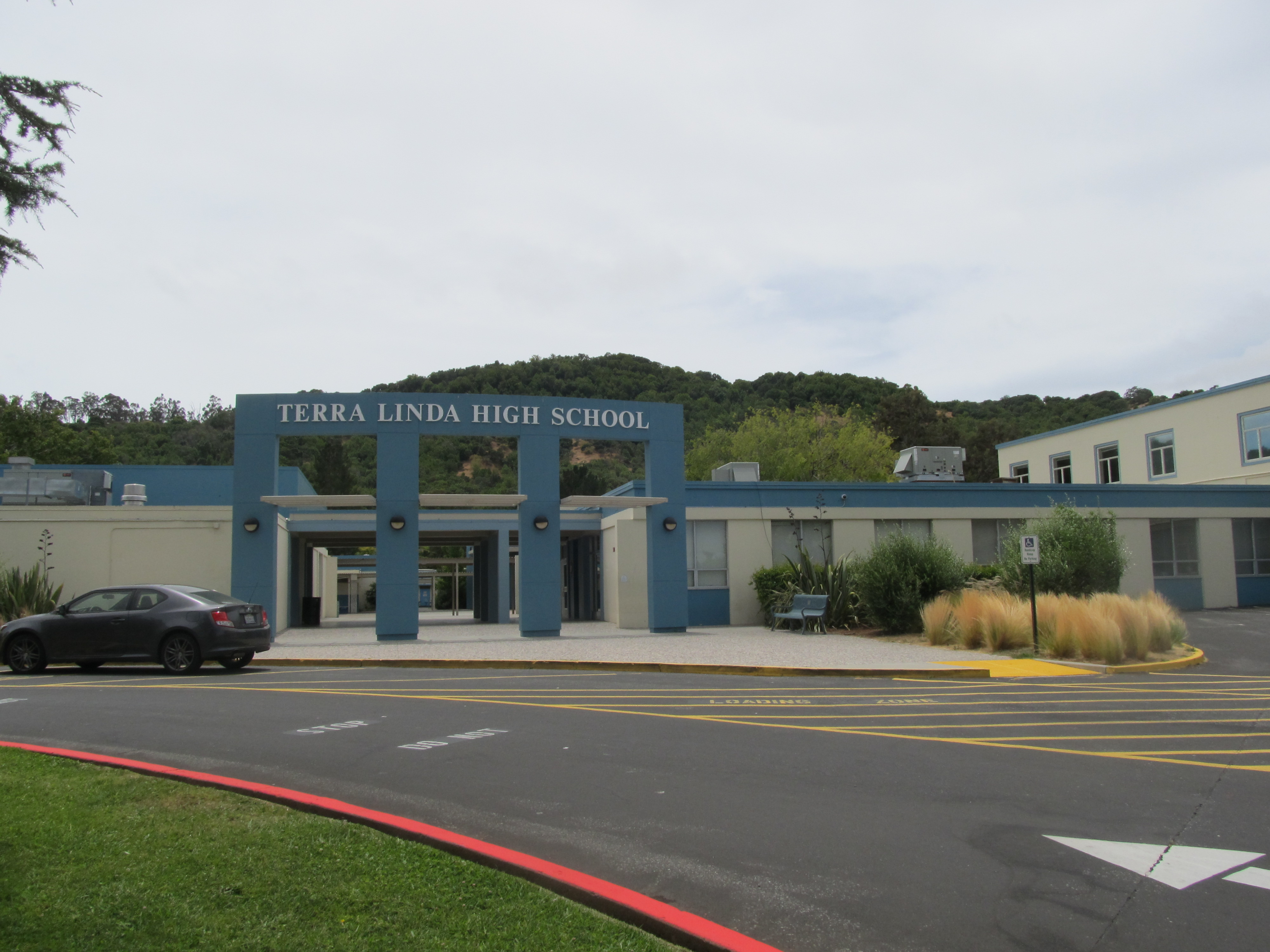
Terra Linda High School in 2014

- Bill "Spaceman" Lee, professional baseball player
- Debrah Farentino, actress known for her role in the soap opera Capitol
- David Haskell, actor known for his performance in Godspell
- Scott Trimble, a location scout known for his work on Iron Man 2
- Pete McRae, rock guitarist
- Rick DeMont, winner of the men's 400 meter freestyle at the 1972 Summer Olympics
- Stacey Bailey, NFL wide receiver
- Barry O'Brien, writer and producer best known for creating the popular Disney channel show Hannah Montana
- Daniel Andreas San Diego, suspected terrorist
- Joe Ayoob, former college football quarterback for the California Golden Bears and paper airplane world record holder
