= Get Modern =

Studio album by The Kats
- Recorded: August 1979
- Genre: Rock
- Label: General Records
- Producer: Noah Shark

The Kats – Get Modern is an album by The Kats that was recorded at Shelter Studios, Hollywood, in 1979. The album was produced and engineered by Noah Shark and Max Reese. It was intended for release on Infinity Records, but the label went out of business before the album could be released. It became known as The Great Lost Kats Album before it was released by General Records.

== Track listing ==
=== Side one ===
1. "Money" (Pete McRae, Freddy Moore)
2. "Prelude to Reason" (McRae)
3. "Reason to Live" (Moore)
4. "Lost My TV Guide" (Moore)
5. "California Here I Come" (Moore)
6. "Heart of Steel" (Moore)

=== Side two ===
1. "Pushed Me to It" (McRae, Moore)
2. "Cry Woof!" (Moore)
3. "Older Girls" (Moore)
4. "King of the Wild Frontier" (Moore)
5. "The Kats (Theme Song)" (Moore)

== Personnel ==
- Pete McRae – lead and rhythm guitars
- Bobbyzio Moore – sax, rhythm guitar, percussion
- Al Galles – drums, vocals
- Dennis Peters – bass, vocals
- Freddy Moore – lead vocals, rhythm guitar
