= Ron Snidow =

American football player (1941–2009)

No. 78, 88
- Positions: Defensive end, Defensive tackle

Personal information
- Born: December 30, 1941; Newport News, Virginia, U.S.
- Died: May 17, 2009 (aged 67); Elba, Italy
- Listed height: 6 ft 3 in (1.91 m)
- Listed weight: 250 lb (113 kg)

Career information
- High school: San Rafael (San Rafael, California)
- College: Oregon
- NFL draft: 1963: 3rd round, 35th overall pick
- AFL draft: 1963: 10th round, 76th overall pick

Career history
- Washington Redskins (1963–1967); Cleveland Browns (1968–1972)

Awards and highlights
- First-team All-PCC (1962)

Career NFL statistics
- Fumble recoveries: 13
- Interceptions: 1
- Sacks: 40
- Stats at Pro Football Reference

Ronald Wayne Snidow (December 30, 1941 – May 17, 2009) was an American professional football defensive tackle in the National Football League (NFL) for the Washington Redskins and Cleveland Browns. He attended San Rafael High School in California. He played college football at the University of Oregon. The Washington Redskins selected Snidow in the third round of the 1963 NFL draft. After five seasons with the Redskins, he was traded to the Cleveland Browns in exchange for a second round draft choice, just prior to the opening of the 1968 season. Snidow was first-team All-Pro with the Browns in 1969. He appeared in 126 career regular season games. After suffering a broken leg while playing with the Browns, he retired at the end of the 1972 season, having played 10 years in the NFL. After retiring from the NFL, Snidow worked as a commercial real estate broker in Southern California, until he retired. In 2008, Snidow was diagnosed with Lou Gehrig's disease, which he died from a year later on May 17, 2009, while on a vacation cruise off the coast of Italy on the island of Elba.
