= Joe Ayoob =

American football player (born 1984)

No. 1, 10
- Position: Quarterback

Personal information
- Born: August 8, 1984 (age 42); San Rafael, California, U.S.
- Listed height: 6 ft 1 in (1.85 m)
- Listed weight: 225 lb (102 kg)

Career information
- High school: Terra Linda (San Rafael)
- College: California
- NFL draft: 2007: undrafted

Career history
- Central Valley Coyotes (2008); Tri-Cities Fever (2009); Central Valley Coyotes (2009); Tri-Cities Fever (2010); Spokane Shock (2011)*
- * Offseason or practice squad member only

Awards and highlights
- Offensive Player of the Year (2004, JC Athletic Bureau/California Community College Football Coaches Association); First-team JC Gridwire All-America (2004); 2× North Coast Section Championship Game MVP (2003 - 2004)
- Stats at ArenaFan.com

Joe Ayoob (born August 8, 1984) is an American football football coach and former player who is currently the head football coach at Terra Linda High School. He played college football for the California Golden Bears and played arena football for the Central Valley Coyotes and Tri-Cities Fever.

Ayoob is also the former world record holder for the longest paper airplane throw. On February 26, 2012, he threw a John Collins-designed paper airplane at a distance of 226 feet 10 inches (69.14 m). As of September 2026, a video of the throw has more than 5 million views.

== Early life ==
Ayoob attended Terra Linda High School, where he was named First-team All-league in football, basketball and baseball. He played in the North Coast Section Championship football games in both his junior and senior seasons.

== College career ==
=== C.C. San Francisco ===
Ayoob originally attended the City College of San Francisco where he was regarded as one of the best junior college quarterbacks in the nation.

Ayoob helped lead the school to a 23-1 record over his two seasons, winning a national championship (12-0) in 2003. In 2004, he was named the state's community college Offensive Player of the year by the JC Athletic Bureau/California Community College Football Coaches Association. He earned First-team JC Gridwire All-America after completing 61.3% (217-of-354) of his passes for 3,679 yards and 35 touchdowns in 2004. He ranked #1 in the state in passing efficiency (177.5) and led the most prolific junior-college offense in California (500.1 yards-per-game). SuperPrep rated him the #2 junior college player in the nation in its postseason JuCo 100. Rivals.com ranked him #15 on its national JC list. He helped lead his team to an 11-1 record, with the team's only loss a 39-32 loss to College of the Canyons in the California state championship game. He was named the Offensive Player of the Game in loss, as he threw for 386 yards and four touchdowns and also rushed for 62 yards on seven carries. In his two seasons at CCSF, he completed 352-of-571 pass attempts (61.6%) for 5,790 yards and 55 touchdowns while rushing for an additional nine touchdowns. He also won the MVP award in the state championship game in each of his two seasons.

=== Cal ===
Ayoob then transferred to the University of California, Berkeley. In 2005, he started nine games at quarterback, after an injury to Nate Longshore, and helped lead the Bears to a 5-4 record in those games. On the season, he passed for 1,707 yards with 15 touchdowns. He ended the season #8 in the Pac-10 in passing yards (155.2 yards-per-game) and ninth in total offense (160.5 yards-per-game). His best game of the season may have been at New Mexico State when he was 17-of-26 passing for a season-high 284 yards and one touchdown. He also ran for three touchdowns on his first three carries. His first career start came on the road against Washington where he went 17-of-27 passing for 271 yards with four first-half touchdown passes. Against Oregon State, he became the first Cal player since Kyle Boller in 2002, to catch, run for, and pass for a touchdown in the same game. He threw for 274 yards against Washington State, including 91 in the final seven minutes when he led the Bears to a 42-38 come-from-behind win. He was 4-of-4 with two touchdowns on Cal's last two possessions. He ran for a touchdown and passed for two touchdowns in the 28-0 win over Arizona. He came off the bench to play in the season opener against Sacramento State, where he completed 0 passes out of 10 attempts. He also came off the bench to play the regular season finale at Stanford.

In 2006, Ayoob played in just four games as Cal's backup quarterback to Nate Longshore. He completed 9-of-22 passes for 187 yards and a 40-yard touchdown pass to DeSean Jackson against Tennessee. He also played against Portland State (2-for-4, 18 yards) and Minnesota (no attempts).

While at Cal, Ayoob majored in Social Welfare.

== Professional career ==
Ayoob was not invited to the 2007 NFL Scouting Combine, so he worked out at Cal's Pro Day.

Pre-draft measurables
Height	Weight	40-yard dash	10-yard split	20-yard split	20-yard shuttle	Three-cone drill	Vertical jump	Broad jump
6 ft 2 in (1.88 m)	225 lb (102 kg)	4.88 s	1.66 s	2.80 s	4.43 s	6.98 s	29 in (0.74 m)	8 ft 10 in (2.69 m)
All values from California Pro Day

Ayoob was projected to go unselected in the 2007 NFL draft. He went unselected in the draft and did not sign with any teams in the NFL, leading him to join the af2 arena football league.

Ayoob joined the Central Valley Coyotes for the 2008 season. On December 2, 2008, he joined the Tri-Cities Fever.

Ayoob was assigned to the Spokane Shock on February 24, 2011.

== Coaching career ==
Ayoob returned to his alma mater, Terra Linda High School, to become their offensive coordinator in 2022.

== Personal ==
Ayoob describes his ethnicity as Lebanese and Mexican. His parents are Joe and Marie Ayoob. His father attended Clemson on a basketball scholarship.

In late February and early March 2012, a viral video spread across the web featuring Ayoob throwing a paper airplane designed by John M. Collins, across an entire air hangar, breaking the world record for the longest flight with a paper airplane, at a distance of 226 feet, 10 inches (≈69.14m). The record was since surpassed by Kim Kyu Tae in 2022.
