= San Rafael High School =

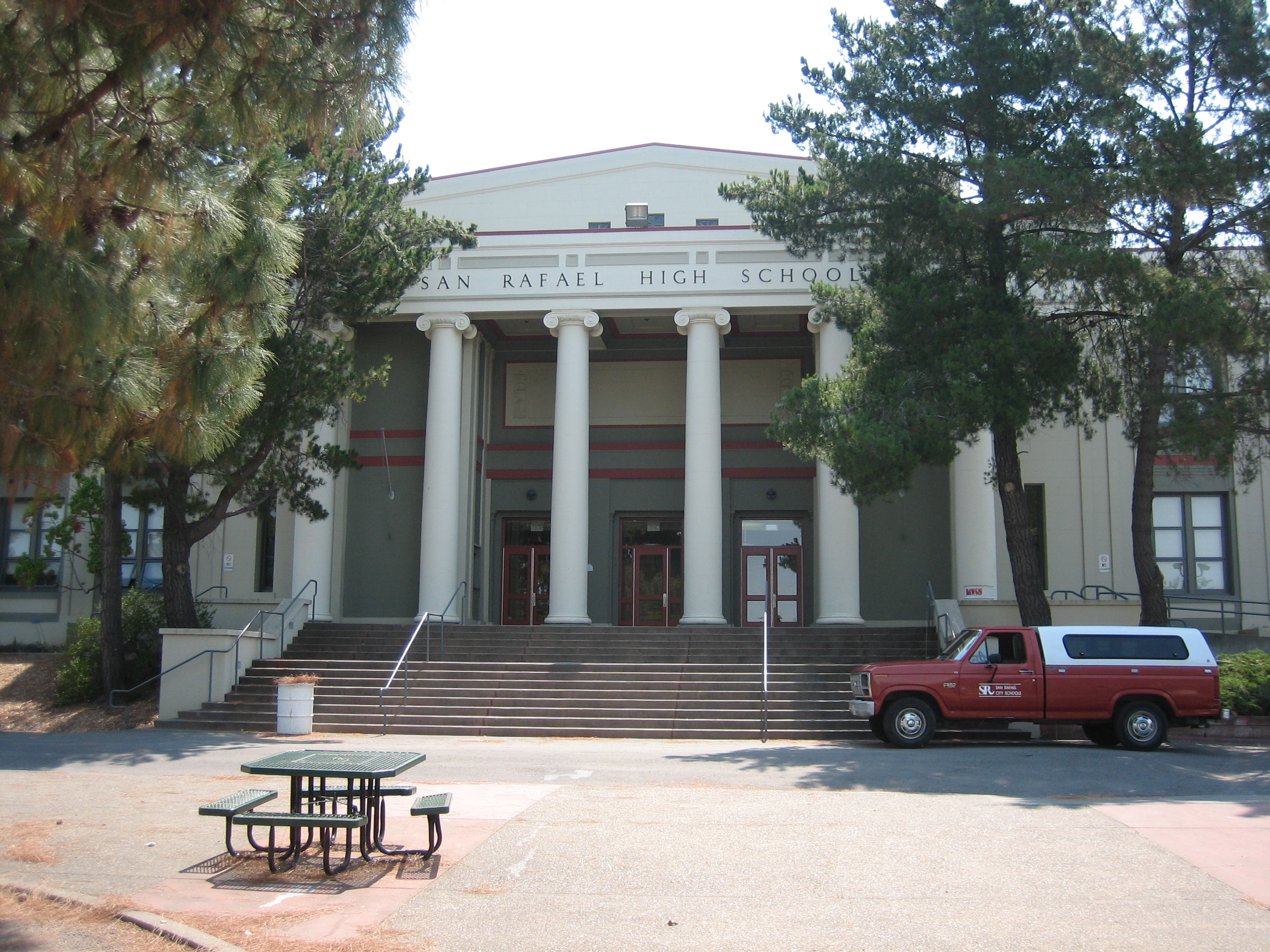

Location
- 150 Third St. San Rafael, California 94901; 37°58′15″N 122°30′48″W

Information
- School type: Public, High school
- Mottoes: San Rafael High School main building
- Founded: 1888
- School board: San Rafael City Schools Board of Education
- School district: San Rafael City Schools
- Oversight: Western Assn of Schools and Colleges, Accrediting Commission for Schools
- Superintendent: Michael R. Watenpaugh
- Principal: Joe Ryan Dominguez
- Grades: 9-12
- Enrollment: 1,302 (2023–2024)
- Language: English, Spanish (ELD program)
- Area: Central Marin County
- Campus type: Suburban
- Colors: Red and White
- Team name: Bulldog
- Rival: Terra Linda High School
- Communities served: San Rafael, California Park, Peacock Gap, Point San Pedro, The Canal, Santa Venetia
- Feeder schools: San Rafael Elementary School District: Davidson Middle School and Gallinas/Venetia Valley Middle School; Bahia Vista Elementary School; Coleman Elementary School; Glenwood Elementary School; Laurel Dell Elementary School; San Pedro Elementary School; Sun Valley Elementary School
- Affiliation: none
- Website: sanrafael.srcs.org
- San Rafael City Schools, SRHS Demographics; San Rafael City Schools, Our Schools

San Rafael High School is a public high school located at 150 Third St. in San Rafael, California, United States.

The school is part of the San Rafael City Schools school district. Its official nickname is the Bulldog; however, its athletic teams have been known casually as the Dawgs since the mid-1980s.

The school is located on a 33-acre (130,000 m^{2}) campus in central San Rafael.

Residents of the high school district may choose either San Rafael High or Terra Linda High School. The high school district includes San Rafael, Santa Venetia, Lucas Valley-Marinwood, and a portion of Larkspur.

== History ==
San Rafael High School opened in 1888. The school's current campus opened in 1924.

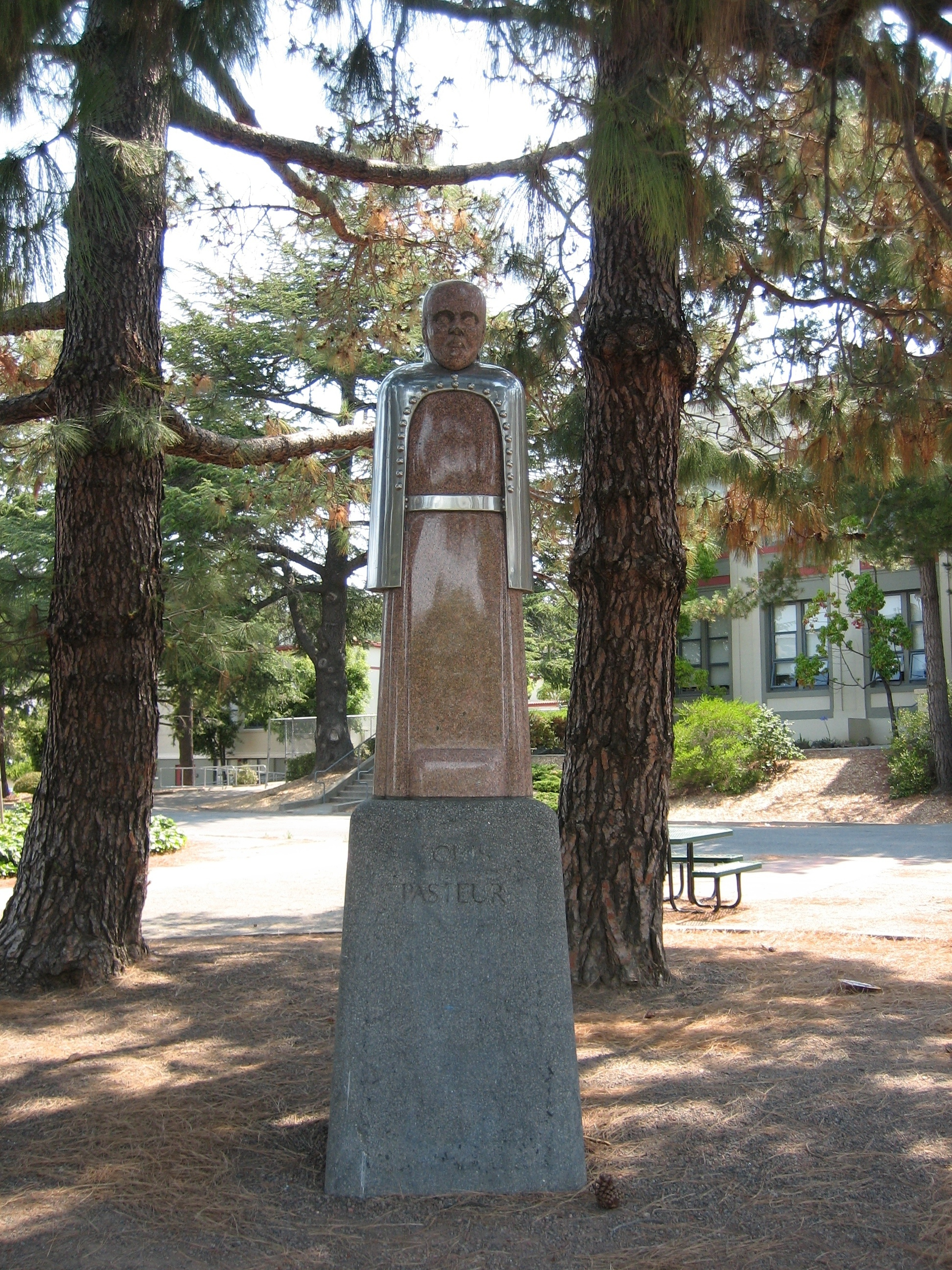
"Bene/Benny" Bufano's 1940 statue of Louis Pasteur in stainless steel and granite, is said to be the site of the original 420 gatherings in 1971.

The school is cited as the 1971 origin of the time and codeword 420 in cannabis culture. Originally "420" served as a code word for "The Waldos", a group of students who would meet in front of the 1940 "Bene/Benny" Bufano statue of Louis Pasteur at 4:20 p.m. to smoke marijuana, both near the statue and at other clandestine locations on campus grounds. The "420" moniker was in widespread use on campus during the 1974–1976 timeframe by the school stoner community. As the usage spread, the original connotations of the term "420" faded away.

San Rafael High School served as the setting for the video of the 1984 power ballad "Sister Christian" by Night Ranger.

KSRH is the school's radio station, which is completely operated by students. The station broadcasts with 10 watts of power on 88.1 FM and 107.3 Cable FM. The station takes requests during school hours at (415) 457-KSRH.

Facilities at the school were upgraded with funds from bond measures passed in 1999 and 2002.

Beginning with the 2001–2002 school year, San Rafael High School moved to an A/B rotating block schedule.

In 2006, the school scored 680 on the Academic Performance Index (API), the California Department of Education’s program for measuring school accountability. It also passed all Adequate Yearly Progress (AYP) criteria required by the federal No Child Left Behind (NCLB) Act of 2001.

In September 2008, the school served as a primary location for the independent feature film The Prankster. School was in session while filming took place and some students and teachers had background roles in the movie. Former principal Judy Colton had a small speaking part with Kurt Fuller, who played Dean Pecarino in the film.

In 2019 construction began on a new two-story building to house the school's administrative offices, a kitchen, general student commons area and classrooms along with support spaces for Madrone High School, a continuation high school on the campus of San Rafael High School.

== Notable alumni ==
Professional baseball

- Jerry Goff (1982) - Catcher for the Montreal Expos, Pittsburgh Pirates, and Houston Astros
- Jesse Foppert (1998) - Pitcher for the San Francisco Giants
- Will Venable (2001) - Outfielder for the San Diego Padres and manager for the Chicago White Sox

Professional football

- Ron Snidow (1959) - Defensive tackle for the Washington Redskins and the Cleveland Browns
- Natu Tuatagaloa (1984) - Defensive end NFL Seattle Seahawks, Cincinnati Bengals, Houston Oilers; elected to the San Rafael City Schools Board of Education in 2001

Stage and screen

- Edgar Kennedy - actor
- Dan Totheroh (1914) - Actor, author, playwright, and screenwriter; long-time member of the Mountain Play Association
- Byron Stewart (1974) - Warren Coolidge on the CBS television series The White Shadow.
- Phillip R. Ford (1979) - Entertainer and cult film director of the 1991 film Vegas in Space.
- Whit Johnson (2000) - Co-anchor on Good Morning America

Public service

- Heidi Kühn (1976) - World Food Prize 2023

Miscellaneous

- Harold Haley (1922) - former Marin County Superior Court Judge
- Eleanor Garatti (1928) - Swimmer, Olympic Gold Medal winner in 1928 and 1932; 1929 world record in the 100-meter freestyle
- Nikki Tyler (1990) - Adult film actress
