= Pete McRae =

American musician

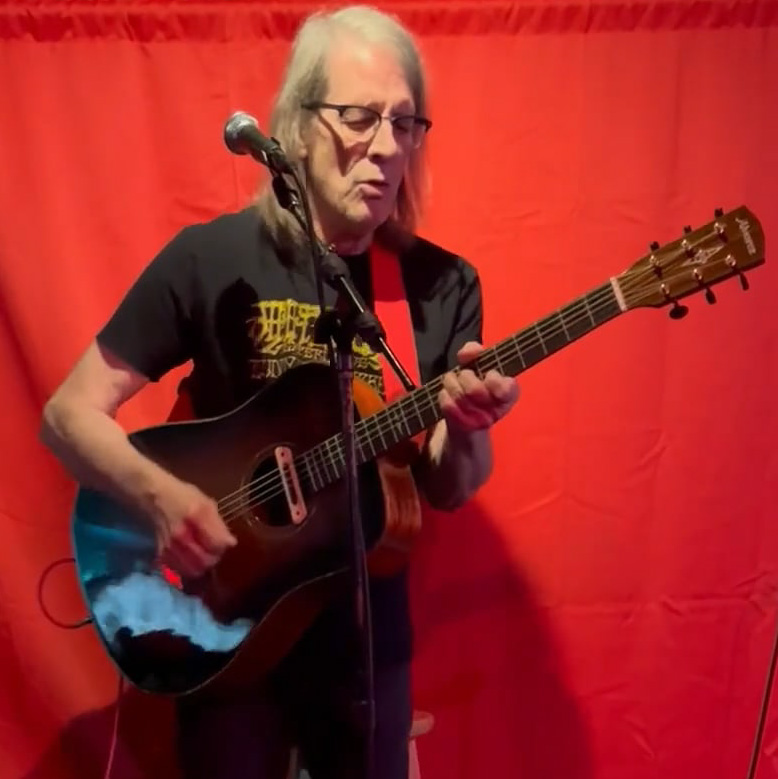
McRae in 2025

Pete McRae (born Robert F. McRae Jr., 1955) is an American rock guitarist.

== Biography ==
Born in Austin, Texas, in 1955, McRae and his family moved to California when he was age ten.

In the late 1980s Pete connected Danlee Mitchell, who set him on the path that led to Kraig Grady, and his mentor Erv Wilson. Mr. Mitchell was kind enough to loan Pete one of Harry Partch's own instruments for a period of months, to study and practice. From c. 1988 to 1993 Pete performed in the Los Angeles area with Kraig Grady, playing a purely acoustic music in just intonation. He played percussion on Kraig's fourth CD, The Stolen Stars, among others.

He is currently living and working on his own music in Charlottesville, VA.

== Discography ==
- L.A. In – (compilation) Rhino Records featuring The Kats – 1979
- Get Modern – (unreleased) by The Kats – 1979; available streaming through Metal Blade Records +
- The Faraghers – Polydor Records by The Faraghers – 1980
- Minimum Wage Rock & Roll – Arista Records by The BusBoys – 1980
- Full Grown Child – Dreamland Records by Holly Penfield – 1980 (pictured, but hired after the recording)
- Convertible Music – Elektra Records by Josie Cotton – 1982
- Back to Avalon – Columbia Records by Kenny Loggins – 1988
- A Different Man – Barclay Records by Peter Kingsbery – 1991
- The Real Ramona – 4AD Records by Throwing Muses – 1991
- Hang Out Your Poetry – DGC Records by Ceremony (feat. Chaz Bono) – 1993 (pictured, but hired after the recording)
- The Stolen Stars: An Anaphorian Dance Drama – by Kraig Grady (Archive Of Anaphoria) 2003
- los angelenos – General Records by The Kat Club – 2007
- LIVE! 1991 "poolside with gilly" – A440 Records by Stan Ridgway – 2007
- Footpaths and Trade Routes – ini itu Records by Anaphoria (Kraig Grady) – 2009
- The Philadelphia Gyil Fusion Project – by Gina Ferrera – 2009
- X – by Rented Mule – 2009
- Pull – by Mr. Mister – 2010 (licensed self-release of 1990 recording)
- Play It Loud – soulsearchmusic by ROMP (Todd Horton) – 2011
