= San Rafael City Schools =

School district in California, United States

San Rafael City Schools is a school district headquartered in San Rafael, California, United States.

The district, according to the San Rafael city charter, is composed of two separate boundaries: the San Rafael Elementary School District and the San Rafael High School District, which are governed by the same board of education. The elementary zone covers the southern half of the city, while the separate Miller Creek Elementary School District covers the northern half. The high school zone covers all of the city. In addition, San Quentin Village and part of Larkspur are within the two districts' boundaries.

== History ==
In 2001 there was a plan devised by the group Parents for Unification that would have removed the portion of the high school district including Terra Linda High School and merged it into the Dixie School District. Doing so would have caused the San Rafael Elementary District to merge with the high school district.

Approved Community Bond Measures - In November 2015, voters approved Measures A and B for modernization and new construction. Measure A provided $108 million to fund capital improvements in the Elementary School District. Measure B provided $161 million for capital projects in the High School District.

The bond program has provided significant funding to create safe, innovative learning environments and instructional technology to support 21st century learning. Additional buildings, classrooms, labs and equipment reduced overcrowding and met the growing demand for hands-on science, technology, engineering, arts and math (STEAM) classes.

District Superintendents: Carmen Ghysels became the superintendent in 2023. Jim Hogeboom (2019-2023), Dr. Michael Watenpaugh (2007-2019), Laura Alvaranga ( -2007)

== Curriculum ==
Beginning in 1997 the high schools began to have courses on Mandarin Chinese. The elementary school district received a $160,000 grant from the federal government to have courses on the same language at the other grade levels.

== Governance ==
San Rafael City Schools shares a common elected Board of Education, with a single superintendent and centralized district office support services. The Governance Team in 2015 includes:

- Linda M. Jackson, Board President
- Paul M. Cohen, Board Vice-President
- Greg Knell, Board Member
- Jon Loberg, Board Member
- Natu Tuatagaloa, Board Member
- Superintendent of Schools Michael Watenpaugh, Ed.D
- Deputy Superintendent Rebecca Rosales

The elementary school district includes most of San Rafael, all of Santa Venetia, and a portion of Larkspur. The high school district includes those portions as well as the areas in the Miller Creek Elementary School District: the rest of San Rafael and all of Lucas Valley-Marinwood.

== Schools ==
The San Rafael Elementary School District is one part of the San Rafael City Schools.

Elementary schools

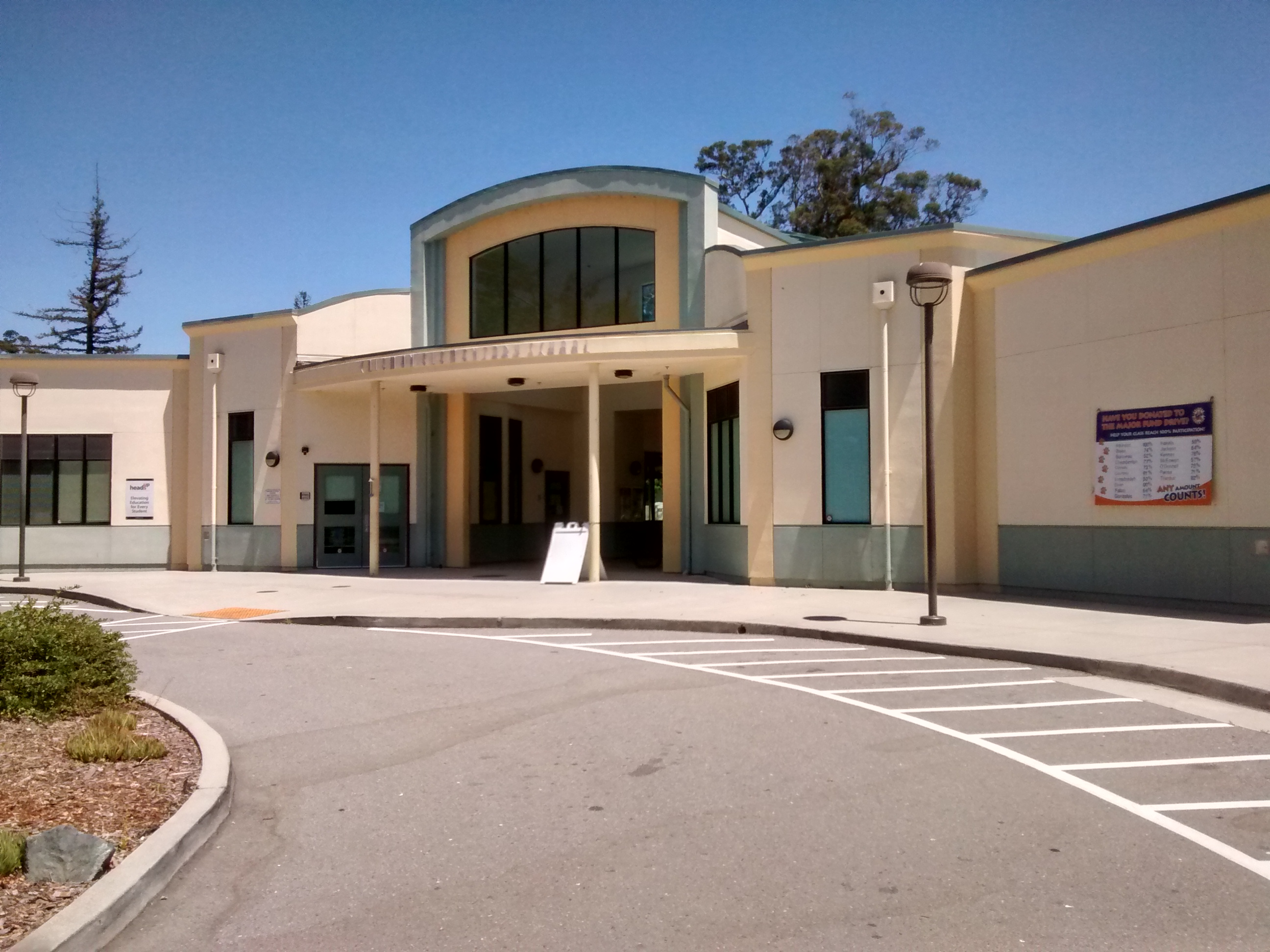
Coleman Elementary School

- Bahia Vista Elementary School is located in southeast San Rafael. It serves the communities of east of Highway 101 and south of the San Rafael Canal, including the portion of Larkspur within the districts' boundaries as well as San Quentin Village.
- Coleman Elementary School is located east of U.S. Route 101 near central San Rafael. It serves the neighborhood near Dominican University of California, the area near San Rafael High School, and downtown San Rafael.
- Glenwood Elementary School is located east of central San Rafael and primarily serves students from eastern San Rafael as well as overflow students from other areas of San Rafael.
- Laurel Dell Elementary School is a small multi-age and multi-cultural school located in central San Rafael.
- San Pedro Elementary School is located east of downtown San Rafael. It serves the communities east of Highway 101 and the area south of the San Rafael Canal.
- Short Elementary School is located in the Gerstle Park neighborhood of San Rafael. This school reopened in August 2010 due to the continued enrollment growth in the elementary school district. For 2010-11 the school will house preschool and kindergarten students.
- Sun Valley Elementary School is at the western end of San Rafael and serves the western portion of San Rafael.
- Venetia Valley K-8 School is located in northern San Rafael near the Marin County Civic Center. It serves the areas of Los Ranchitos and Santa Venetia.

Middle schools

- James B. Davidson Middle School- located in the central section of San Rafael. Students attending Bahia Vista, Coleman, Glenwood, Laurel Dell, San Pedro and Sun Valley Elementary Schools attend Davidson. Some Venetia Valley students also choose to attend Davidson Middle School.
- Venetia Valley K-8 School- renamed after school was remodeled. First graduate of school was Joseph Gabriel class of '07

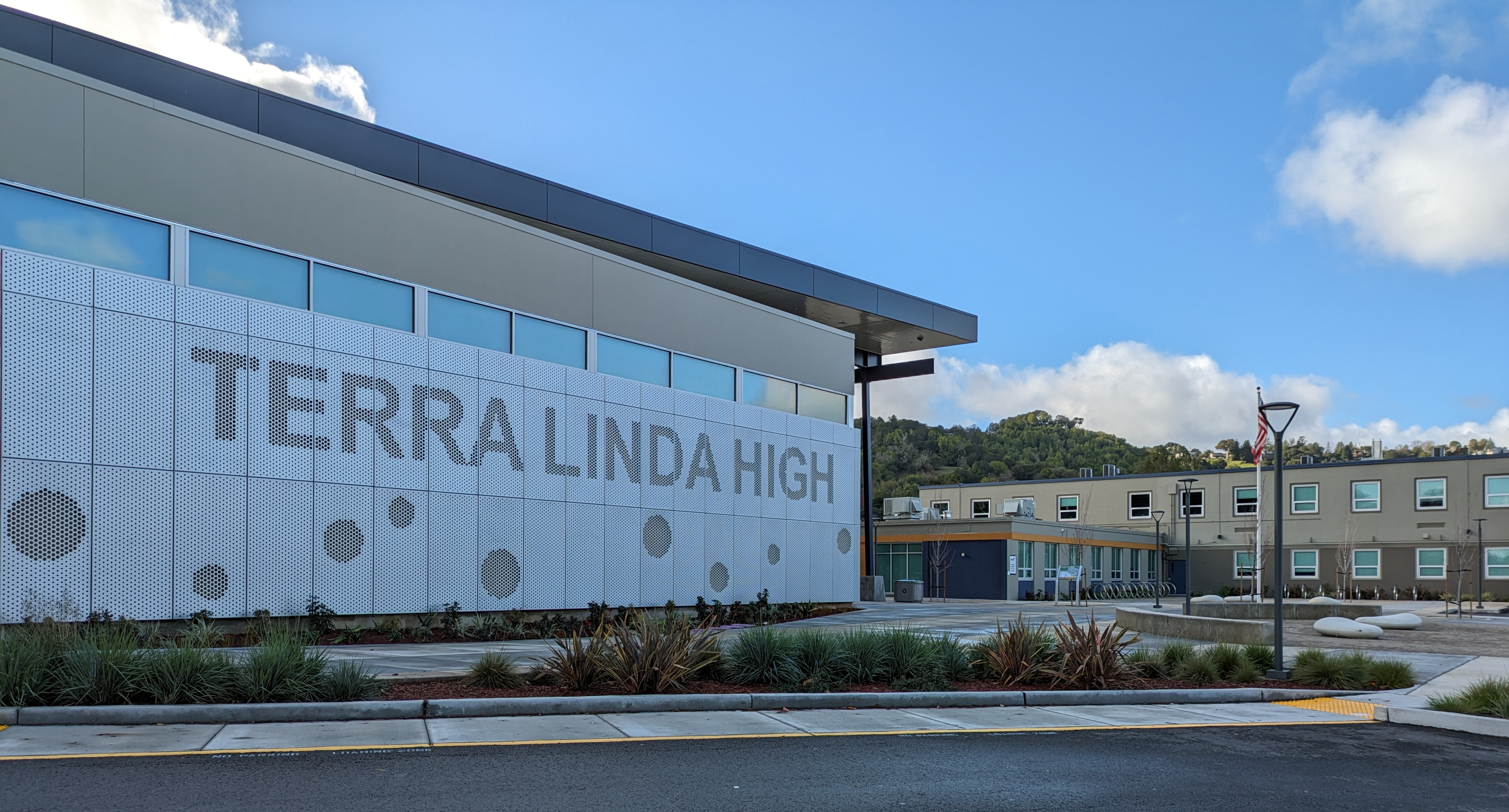
Terra Linda High School

The San Rafael High School District includes:

Comprehensive high schools

- San Rafael High School is located in central San Rafael, east of Highway 101.
- Terra Linda High School is located in northern San Rafael, west of Highway 101.

Continuation high schools

- Madrone Continuation High School is a public secondary school located on the San Rafael High School campus. The school principal is Jane Songer. Madrone Continuation High School provides alternative education for students in grades ten through twelve, emphasizing individual attention for students with special needs. In 2006, the school scored 575 on the Academic Performance Index (API), the California Department of Education's program for measuring school accountability. It also passed all Adequate Yearly Progress (AYP) criteria required by the federal No Child Left Behind Act of 2001. Students in the San Rafael High School District may enter Madrone with a recommendation from the district referral committee.
