= PEN Oakland awards =

Multicultural literary awards

The PEN Oakland/Josephine Miles Literary Award is for U.S. multicultural writers, to "promote works of excellence by writers of all cultural and racial backgrounds and to educate both the public and the media as to the nature of multicultural work." It was founded by PEN Oakland in 1991 and named in honor of Josephine Miles. PEN Oakland was founded in 1989. The award was dubbed the "Blue Collar PEN Award" by The New York Times.

In 1997, Pen Oakland inaugurated its PEN Oakland/Gary Webb Anti-Censorship Award to protest censorship practices within the U.S. Other awards are the PEN Oakland/Reginald Lockett Lifetime Achievement Award established in 2006; and the PEN Oakland/Adelle Foley Award established in 2016 and "given to a work, not fiction or poetry, that has done much to improve the relations between people in American society."

Although PEN Oakland unsuccessfully attempted to become the USA's third PEN center, the attempt did succeed in opening the doors for PEN Oakland to become a full chapter of the PEN Center USA. PEN Oakland also introduced a resolution for more equitable media coverage of minorities and ethnic groups. The group sponsored the Oakland Literature Expo portion of the City of Oakland’s Art & Soul Festival from 2001 through 2004.

The award is one of many PEN awards sponsored by International PEN affiliates in over 145 PEN centres around the world.

== Josephine Miles Award ==
- 2025 James Shapiro, (George Wallace, Ana Spasic and Francesco Paolo Paladino), Paco Roca, Garth Greenwell, Nina Schuyler, Danzy Senna, Rebecca Boyle, William Wong, Carvell Wallace, Gayl Jones, Tricia Romano
- 2024 Henry Threadgill and Brent Hayes Edwards, Airea D. Matthews, Daniel Mason, C. L. R. James (Nic Watts and Sakina Karimgee), Thomas Pecore Weso, Danny Romero, Dylan C. Penningworth, Pat Thomas
- 2023 Javier Zamora, Ada Limón, John N. Serio, T. J. English, Leila Mottley, Jenny Xie, Kobena Mercer, D. S. Marriott, Gilbert Hernandez, Jaime Hernandez, and Mario Hernandez
- 2022 Chanda Prescod-Weinstein, Susana Praver-Perez, Alison Bechdel, Gloria Gervitz (translated from Spanish by Mark Schafer), Joan Steinau Lester, CAConrad, Talib Kweli
- 2021 Joy Harjo, LeAnne Howe, and Jennifer Foerster; Nguyen Phan Que Mai; Derf Backderf; Christopher Bernard; Daphne Brooks; Nikki Giovanni; Terry McMillan
- 2020 Nick Estes, Sigrun Susan Lane, Jericho Brown, Maya Khosla, Jillian Weise, Jia Tolentino, Stephanie McCurry
- 2019 Richard Powers; Alicia Garza, Opal Tometi and Patrisse Khan-Cullors; Ha Jin; Jamel Brinkley; David Blight; Kalamu ya Salaam; Vernon Keeve III; James Cagney, Jason Lutes
- 2018 Andrew Sean Greer, Jerome Rothenberg, Julie Lythcott-Haims, M.L. Liebler, Paul Ortiz, Percival Everett, Tongo Eisen-Martin
- 2017 Randa Jarrar, Gerald Horne, MK Chavez, Nancy Isenberg, Arturo Mantecon, Kurt Schweigman and Lucille Lang Day, John Edgar Wideman
- 2016 Elizabeth Alexander, Ta-Nehisi Coates, Frances Gateward, Latif Harris, Juan Felipe Herrera, John Jennings, Gerald Vizenor
- 2015 Natasha Trethewey, Lenelle Moïse, Claudia Rankine, Peter Herris, Deborah A. Miranda, Roxanne Dunbar-Ortiz
- 2014 Daniel Chacon, Edwidge Danticat, Claudia Moreno Pisano, Roger Reeves, Nina Serrano, Akinyele Omowale Umoja
- 2013 Andrew Lam, Luis J. Rodriguez, Denise M. Sandoval, Lucille Lang Day, Toni Morrison, Tim Seibles, Christopher Wagstaff
- 2012 Melinda Palacio, Michael Warr, Aurora Harris, Deena Metzger, Ed Sanders, Mary Mackey, Jesmyn Ward
- 2011 Devreaux Baker, N. Banerjee, J. P. Dancing Bear, John Farris, Jim Harrison, S. Kaipa, Lola Shoneyin, Barry Spector, P. Sundaralingam, Susan Suntree, Gary Snyder, Eric Miles Williamson
- 2010 Clifton Ross, Elizabeth Nunez, Etel Adnan, Manuel Ruben Delgado, Andrena Zawinski, Maria Espinosa, Mitch Horowitz, Ivan J. Houston
- 2009 Doren Robbins, Charles L. Robinson & Al Young, Herbert Gold, Janice Blue, C. Paolo Caruso, Richard Bruce Nugent
- 2008 Joanne Kyger, Rosa Martha Villarreal, Rebecca Solnit, Juan Felipe Herrera, Colleen J. McElroy, Cecil Brown, Colson Whitehead
- 2007 Will Alexander, Karla Andersdatter, Kathleen de Azevedo, Steve Dalachinsky, Adam P. Kennedy, William Poy Lee, Lorena Oropeza & Dionne Espinoza, Harriet A. Washington
- 2006 David Hilliard, Mike Madison, Gerald Haslam, Eric Gansworth, Jennifer Murphy, Mona Lisa Saloy, Richard Silberg, A. D. Winans
- 2005 David Meltzer, Neeli Cherkovski, Derek Walcott, Jeffery Paul Chan, Suhayl Saadi, Aldon Lynn Nielsen
- 2004 Edgardo Vega Yunqué, Noemi Sohn, Lewis Robinson, Monique Truong, Jill Nelson, Fred Reiss
- 2003 Clive Matson and Allan Cohen, Gail Tsukiyama, Paul Flores, Ghada Karmi, Jack Hirschman, Luis J. Rodriguez, Jewell Parker Rhodes
- 2002 A. Van Jordon, Nathalie Handal, Myronn Hardy, Agha Shahid Ali, Charles Rubin
- 2001 Mary Monroe, Dan Leone, Yehuda Amichai, Leza Lowitz, Leslie Marmon Silko, Jervey Tervalon
- 2000 José García Villa, Elmaz Abinader, Wendy Doniger, Rabbi Alan Lew, Nathan Englander, Eleanor Taylor Bland
- 1999 Darryl Babe Wilson, Mike Davis, Elaine Marcus Starkman & Marsha Lee Berkman, Ruth Forman, Koon Woon, Clyde Taylor
- 1998 John Mulligan, Ibrahim Fawal, Alfred Arteaga, Leslie Woodd, Marketa Groves
- 1997 Devorah Major, Percival Everett, Julie Shigekuni, Michael Lally, Kevin Killian, Ray Gonzalez
- 1996 Gerald Vizenor, Jerome Rothenberg & Pierre Joris, Norman Mailer, Reginald Lockett, Barbara Guest, Chitra Divakaruni
- 1995 Alma Luz Villanueva, E. Ethelbert Miller, Michael McClure, Marilyn Chin, Juvenal Acosta
- 1994 Peter J. Harris, Phyllis Burke, Brenda Lane Richardson, Clifford E. Trafzer, Russell Leong, Jerome Rothenberg, Paula Woods, Felix Liddell
- 1993 Francisco X. Alarcón, Opal Palmer Adisa, Lucha Corpi, Sylvia Lopez-Medina, Louis Owens, Sylvia Watanabe
- 1992 Luis J. Rodriguez, David Mura, Louis Edwards, Thomas King, David Ignatow, Julia Alvarez
- 1991 Gerald Vizenor, Jess Mowry, Li-Young Lee, Gerald Haslam, Joy Harjo, Gerald Stern

== Gary Webb Anti-Censorship Award ==
Gary Webb Anti-Censorship Award recipients
Year	Recipient(s)
1997	Floyd Salas
1998	Gerald Nicosia
1999	Mumia Abu-Jamal and Gary Webb
2000	Robert Parry
2001	William Mandel, Rabbi Michael Lerner, and Daniel Hernandez
2002	Barbara Lee
2003	Sam Hamill
2004	George Julius Theodule
2005	Kitty Kelley
2006	Bill Moyers
2007	Greg Palast
2008	Project Censored
2009	Jefferson Morely
2010	Richard Prince
2011	WikiLeaks and Carole Simpson
2012	Alexander Cockburn
2013	Chris Hedges
2014	Abraham Bolden
2015	Lincoln Bergman
2016	Museum of the African Diaspora
2018	The Honorable Libby Schaaf
2019	Kim Shuck
2020	Omarosa Manigault Newman
2021	Roxane Gay
2022	Jefferson Morley
2025	Dr. Rupa Marya and Joy Reid

== Reginald Lockett Lifetime Achievement Award ==
Reginald Lockett Lifetime Achievement Award recipients
Year	Recipient(s)
2006	Joyce Jenkins
2007	Andy Ross
2008	Reginald Lockett, Adrienne Kennedy, Diane di Prima
2009	A. D. Winans, Harriet Rohmer, and Kristin Hunter Lattany
2010	Paul Krassner and Vance Bourjaily
2011	Adam David Miller
2012	Q. R. Hand, Jr.
2013	Jesse Douglas Taylor
2014	Askia M. Touré
2015	Avotcja and Marvin X
2016	Clarence Major
2018	Ana Castillo
2019	Percival Everett
2020	Thomas Sanchez, Robert Sward
2021	Genny Lim
2022	Nellie Wong and Bruce Anderson
2023	Louise Meriwether and Sarah Webster Fabio
2024	Judy Juanita and Marco Portales
2025	Brenda Hillman and E. Ethelbert Miller

== Adelle Foley Award ==
Adelle Foley Award recipients
Year	Recipient(s)
2016	Shira A. Scheindlin
2018	Avotcja
2019	Alexandria Ocasio-Cortez
2020	Henry Dumas
2021	Margaret Porter Troupe and Gavin Newsom
2022	Rusty Morrison
2023	Daily Kos and Joyce Wong
2024	Nina Serrano and Dorsey Nunn
2025	Miharu Ice Cream and Mona Vaughn Scott

== Reginald Martin Award for Excellence in Criticism ==
Reginald Martin Award recipients
Year	Recipient(s)
2018	Judy Grahn
2019	Tressie McMillan Cottom
2021	Jerry W. Ward, Jr.
2025	Deborah Jowitt and Helen Vendler
