= Richard Prince (disambiguation) =

Richard Prince (born 1949) is an American painter and photographer.

Richard Prince may also refer to:

- Richard Archer Prince (1865–1936), British actor who murdered William Terriss
- Richard Prince (journalist) (born 1947), African-American journalist
- Richard Prince (MP), Member of Parliament (MP) for Bridgnorth and Ludlow

== See also ==
- Prince Richard (disambiguation)
