= Barbecue murders =

1975 double homicide in Marin County, California, United States

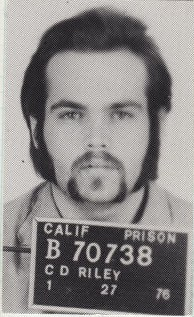
- Charles "Chuck" Riley at the time of his arrest for murder in 1976
- Location: 353 Hibiscus Way, Terra Linda, San Rafael, California, U.S.
- Date: June 21, 1975; 51 years ago
- Attack type: Double-murder, parricide, beating, stabbing, suffocation, shooting
- Victims: Naomi Eleanor Wagner Olive and James Fenton Olive II
- Perpetrators: Charles David Riley and Marlene Louise Olive
- Verdict: Guilty on all counts
- Convictions: Riley: First-degree murder (2 counts); Marlene: Aiding and abetting and accessory to homicides (Note: Violation of Section 602 of the California State Welfare and Institutions Code)
- Sentence: Riley: Death; commuted to life imprisonment with the possibility of parole (released after 40 years); Marlene: Confinement of 3 to 6 years in a juvenile facility (released after 4 years)

The barbecue murders, also known as the BBQ murders, refers to a 1975 double murder in Marin County, California, United States. Business consultant James "Jim" Olive and his wife Naomi were murdered in their home by their 16-year-old adopted daughter Marlene and her 20-year-old boyfriend Charles "Chuck" Riley, who then attempted to dispose of the bodies by burning them in a barbecue pit at a nearby campground. Riley was convicted of two counts of first-degree murder and received a sentence of death, which was later changed to life imprisonment with the possibility of parole. Marlene, tried as a juvenile, received a sentence of three to six years in a California Youth Authority juvenile facility, from which she was released at age 21 having served just over four years.

The case gained worldwide attention due to the perpetrators' ages, the details of the crime, and the wide disparity in sentencing between the two perpetrators. Riley and Olive have also been the subjects of continuing coverage in connection with his repeated bids for parole and her subsequent convictions for numerous other crimes.

== Background ==
=== Olive family background ===
Marlene Louise Olive was born in Norfolk, Virginia on January 15, 1959 to an unwed teenager. She was adopted as a newborn by a middle-aged childless couple James "Jim" and Naomi Olive and spent her childhood up to her early teens in Guayaquil, Ecuador, where Jim Olive worked as a marketing executive for Tenneco and Gulf Oil. She was very close to her adoptive father but had a troubled relationship with her adoptive mother, who reportedly had alcoholism and a mental illness commonly thought to be schizophrenia.

When Marlene was 14, her father lost his job and moved the family back to the United States, settling in Marin County, California in the Terra Linda community of the city of San Rafael. Jim Olive became a self-employed small-business consultant and spent less time with his daughter as he tried to make his business succeed. Marlene had difficulty adjusting from her relatively sheltered life in Ecuador to the unfamiliar, permissive Northern California teen culture. She developed a stomach ulcer that required prescription pills and soon began to use the pills and other drugs recreationally and socialize with other teenage drug users. She also became interested in glam rock, witchcraft, and prostitution, the third interest stemming from repeatedly being called a "whore" by her adoptive mother.

The relationship between Marlene and Naomi Olive worsened after the move to the United States, and their arguments erupted into domestic violence. Over time, Marlene also developed resentment toward her father for siding with her mother in disputes and suspected him of informing police about her friends' drug activities. She shoplifted, stole her parents' credit cards, used and overdosed on drugs, ran away from home, and received stolen goods from burglaries committed by a boyfriend. She talked to several friends about wanting to kill her parents and asked some of them to help, but the friends either did not take her seriously or decided not to get involved. At one point, she attempted to poison her mother by mixing large doses of prescription drugs into her mother's food, but the drugs made the food taste bitter, and Naomi refused to eat it.

=== Charles Riley's background ===
Charles "Chuck" Riley was born on May 2, 1955 in Marin County to Oscar and Joanne Riley, a bakery worker and a nurse's aide, and lived most of his life in Santa Venetia. Obese since childhood, by age 15 he weighed over 300 pounds (140 kg). Before he met Olive, he had never had a girlfriend. He dropped out of high school in his senior year and worked as a newspaper and pizza deliveryman, bartender, and factory worker. He was a heavy drug user and also dealt drugs, both to earn money and to gain social status and popularity. He owned several guns and was a skilled marksman.

=== Charles Riley's relationship with Marlene Olive ===
When he was 19, Riley met 15-year-old Olive while dealing drugs at her high school. He developed a crush on her and began to pursue her. Although she was initially put off by his weight, the couple eventually had sex and began a relationship, which Olive largely controlled. Riley provided her with free drugs, gifts, and transportation, listened to her problems, and sometimes helped her carry out sexual or criminal fantasies. She frequently threatened to break up with Riley unless he did what she wanted and claimed to have magical powers of control over him, in which he reportedly believed. He was anxious to please her in order to continue the relationship and twice attempted suicide when she briefly broke up with him. As she had with previous boyfriends, Olive soon began to ask Riley for help or advice in killing her mother or suggest that he kill her parents. Jim and Naomi Olive initially approved of their daughter dating Riley, finding him polite and responsible.

At Olive's suggestion, the couple carried out a prolonged shoplifting spree, stealing approximately $6,000 in merchandise (primarily women's clothing and accessories) from local stores over several weeks until they were caught in the act and arrested for grand larceny in March 1975. Riley had no prior history of delinquency or antisocial conduct as a juvenile (aside from drug dealing), and this was his first adult arrest. In May 1975, Riley was arrested again for possession of marijuana and a sawed-off shotgun. Jim and Naomi threatened their daughter with juvenile hall, planned to send her away to school, and forbade her to see Riley again, the prohibition also being included in a court order. Jim Olive ordered Riley to stay away from the Olives' house, threatening to kill him if he ever returned.

== Murders ==
On Saturday, June 21, 1975, following another argument with her mother, Olive telephoned Riley and told him, "Get your gun, we've got to kill the bitch today". She arranged to go out with her father, leaving her mother home alone and leaving a door unlocked through which Riley could then enter and kill her mother. Riley, who was carrying a loaded .22 caliber revolver and later said he had taken LSD, entered the house where Naomi Olive was sleeping.

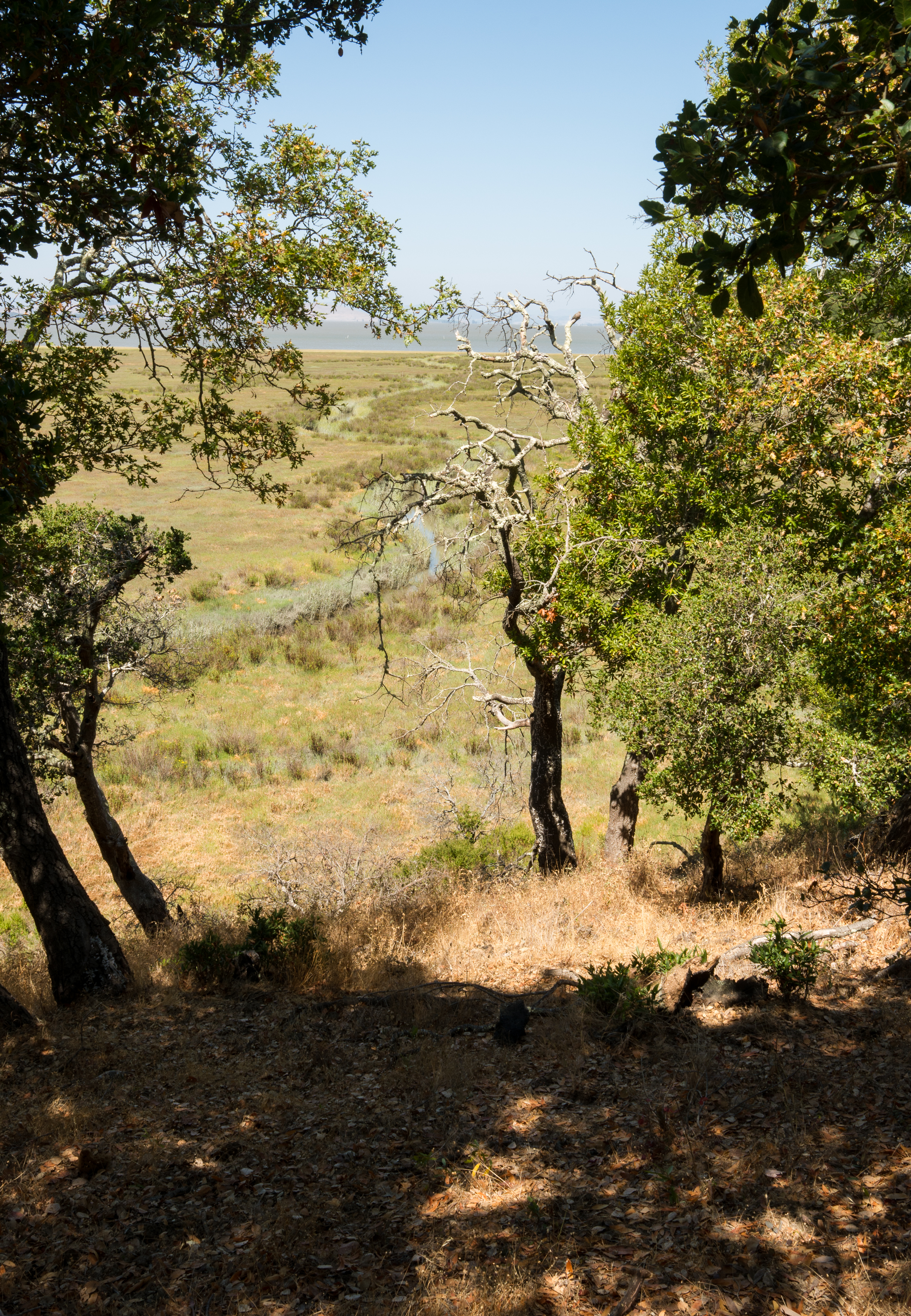
China Camp State Park in Marin County, California, where the bodies of murder victims Jim and Naomi Olive were burned in a barbecue pit

Afterward, Riley told police that he had struck Naomi "many times" with a hammer (a statement he later recanted under hypnosis), stabbed, and suffocated her. While Riley was still in the house, Jim returned, saw his wife lying in bed covered with blood, picked up a knife, and started toward Riley, exclaiming, "I'll kill you". Riley drew his gun and shot Jim four times, killing him.

Olive and Riley tried to dispose of the bodies by transporting them to a wooded area at nearby China Camp and burning them in a barbecue pit with gasoline and logs in an attempt to make them unrecognizable. The couple left while the bodies were still burning. A fireman who arrived shortly thereafter to put out the unattended fire initially mistook the partially burnt remains for a deer carcass. The couple later returned to the park and further burned the remains along with additional evidence.

With a friend, the couple cleaned up the room where the killings had taken place, removing blood from the carpet, walls, and furniture. They confided in the friend who helped clean and in several other friends that they had killed the Olives, with Riley undertaking the killings. Riley told friends, "We had to do it. They wouldn't let me see her." Olive and Riley continued to live together at the Olives' house for several days, attending a Yes concert, shopping, eating at restaurants, and paying their expenses using cash, checks, and credit cards taken from her dead parents. They allegedly planned to wait for Jim and Naomi to be declared dead, collect the life insurance money, and move to Ecuador.

After a few days, Jim Olive's business partner became concerned about his absence from work and contacted police, who visited the Olive house and spoke with Olive. She provided various alibis for herself and Riley, which the police later determined were false, and stories about her parents having either disappeared or died, claiming that one parent had killed the other and then disappeared with the body or that both parents were killed by Hells Angels. Police also noted the recently cleaned room in the otherwise disordered house. The friend who had helped clean informed the police about the blood in the room and the couple's statements about killing the Olives and burning their bodies. Acting either on information from Olive or her friend, police searched the China Camp barbecue pit and determined that it contained fragments of burnt human remains. Olive and Riley were arrested.

After his arrest, Riley made a detailed confession, in which he said that he and Olive had been planning to kill her parents for some time; that he had beaten, stabbed, and suffocated Naomi Olive and then shot Jim Olive; and that Olive had made him do it. However, Olive claimed that Riley had killed her parents of his own accord and that afterward he had held her hostage and forced her to take drugs.

== Court proceedings ==
=== Charles Riley's trial ===
Based on his initial confession, Riley, who was an adult over 18 (aged 20) at the time of the crime, was charged with two counts of first-degree murder for killing Jim and Naomi Olive and faced the death penalty. Under hypnosis, Riley later recanted the part of his initial confession about beating Naomi Olive with the hammer, saying that when he entered the house, he found her lying in bed, bleeding from head wounds and near death, with the hammer embedded in her head. Riley thus implied that Olive (who had been using the hammer that morning to repair a platform shoe) had fatally beaten her mother with the hammer before leaving the house. Riley contended that he had stabbed and suffocated Naomi because she was suffering and near death from the hammer attack and he was trying to end her misery. He said that he initially confessed to killing Naomi in order to protect Olive by taking the blame for her actions. Riley admitted shooting Jim Olive, but said he acted out of fear and self-defense as Jim had threatened to kill him.

At his trial, Charles testified under hypnosis about the events of the murder and that he had not beaten Naomi Olive. The jury was not convinced, and convicted him on both counts of first-degree murder for killing both victims. He was sentenced to death on January 26, 1976.

Author and reporter Richard M. Levine later wrote that compared to Olive, Riley did not harbor much anger at Naomi Olive whom he barely knew, therefore Riley would be less likely to use a method of homicide suggesting rage and would have used his loaded gun as the weapon rather than a hammer; and that Olive had previously asked Riley how hard she would have to hit Naomi Olive in order to kill her. However, others have noted that Olive had no blood on her clothing when she left the house and would not have had time to change clothes; that Riley used a hammer to avoid alerting neighbors because it made less noise than a gunshot; and that according to a hypnosis expert, Riley's revised confession lacked credibility. Olive continued to maintain that Riley had beaten and killed her mother in addition to shooting her father, and denied that she herself had any part in the killing of either parent.

=== Marlene Olive's juvenile court trial ===
Olive, who was a 16-year-old minor at the time of the crime, was tried as a juvenile rather than an adult, and was represented by the well-known defense attorney Terence Hallinan. She was charged with violating Section 602 of the California State Welfare and Institutions Code, which at that time covered any crime committed by a juvenile, from petty crimes up to and including murder. The court ruled that she had violated Section 602, stating that she "did encourage, instigate, aid, abet, and act as accomplice in the homicides of her parents." In announcing his decision, Judge Charles R. Best stated, "The uncontroverted evidence regarding the father is that Chuck Riley killed him. As to who actually did in the mother, we'll never know."

Olive was sentenced to a term of four to six years' confinement at the California Youth Authority at Ventura (also known as the Ventura School). She was to be released by her 21st birthday unless the youth authority determined she had not been rehabilitated, in which case she could be kept in custody up to age 23.

== Aftermath ==
=== Charles Riley ===
In December 1976, the California state supreme court ruled that the California death penalty statute, which then required a mandatory death penalty for certain categories of murder, was unconstitutional in view of the U.S. Supreme Court's recent rulings in Gregg v. Georgia and other cases. As a result, California prisoners sentenced to death under the unconstitutional statute, including Riley, could not be executed. Riley's sentence was changed from death to two concurrent life sentences with the possibility of parole after 7 years. While in prison, Riley lost weight, received his high school diploma, and earned the equivalent of a college degree.

After becoming eligible, Riley applied for parole approximately a dozen times and was denied each time. In 2011, Riley, now 56 and physically disabled, appealed his most recent denial on the grounds that there was no evidence he continued to be a danger to the community, that the parole board did not consider his age, and that his sentence had been unconstitutionally excessive. Riley won a new court-ordered parole hearing, at which the parole board found him suitable for release and granted parole. However, on February 6, 2015, the parole board's decision was reversed by California Governor Jerry Brown, who explained that "although [Riley] professes to accept some responsibility, he continues to downplay his role in this crime. Until Mr. Riley is able to come to terms with his role in this horrendous double murder, I do not believe he will be able to avoid violent behavior if released."

Riley appealed the Governor's reversal of the parole board's decision. On December 3, 2015, the California Court of Appeal for the First District vacated the Governor's reversal and reinstated Riley's grant of parole, stating, "We cannot affirm the Governor's decision because the premise of his conclusion—that Riley has failed 'to come to terms with his role in the double murder'—is unsupported by any evidence. There being no evidence in the record that Riley 'continues to downplay his role in this crime,' the Governor's decision cannot stand." Following the court's directive, the parole board's 2015 annual report released in January 2016 showed Riley as having been deemed suitable for release and granted parole as of December 8, 2015.

=== Marlene Olive ===
Olive began serving her sentence at the Ventura School and was later allowed to serve part of her time living outside the school with a young woman who had been a juvenile services volunteer. A few weeks before she was due to be paroled, she escaped and fled to New York City where she worked as a prostitute. She was eventually arrested and returned to California to finish her sentence, finally being released in 1980 when she was 21.

After being released, she moved to the Los Angeles area, where she changed her name numerous times and was arrested at least seven times over the next decade on forgery and drug-related charges, serving two one-year terms in jail. In 1986, she was one of 14 people arrested in Los Angeles for allegedly operating a large counterfeiting and forgery ring, of which she was thought to be the ringleader. She was subsequently convicted and sentenced to five years in prison. She served additional prison terms in California after a 1992 conviction for making a false financial statement, and a 1995 conviction for possessing a forged drivers' license. In 2003 in Kern County, California, she pleaded guilty to passing a fictitious check in Bakersfield and was sentenced to seven years in prison. A 1992 Los Angeles Times article called her "the queen of the trashers" due to her alleged skills at committing forgery and fraud and creating false identities based on documents, such as voided checks, obtained from discarded garbage. Police said "they [had] rarely come across a street-level forger believed to be as prolific or as skilled as Olive."

Olive saw Riley only once after they were arrested for murder, when she visited him in prison in 1981. After the visit, Riley correctly predicted, "I'll never see her again."

== In popular culture ==
Marlene Olive, graphite and ink drawing by Marlene McCarty

Richard M. Levine, a feature writer for numerous publications including The New York Times, New York, Harper's, and Esquire, wrote a true crime book about the case, Bad Blood: A Family Murder in Marin County (Random House, 1982), which was widely reviewed and became a bestseller. The case was also discussed in John Godwin's book Murder U.S.A.: The Ways We Kill Each Other (Ballantine, 1978) and in several later true crime anthologies.

During the 1990s, Levine's book inspired American artist Marlene McCarty to create a series of drawings about the teenage Marlene Olive, her relationships, and the barbecue murders. These led to a broader group of works by McCarty on the subject of teenage female murderers known as Murder Girls, which explored issues of female aggression, sexuality, sexism, and family relations. Olive continued to be, in the words of Maud Lavin, the "chief protagonist" of the series, and at least one exhibition of McCarty's work focused solely on her and the barbecue murders. McCarty's drawing, titled Marlene Olive: 353 Hibiscus Way — Marin County, California — June 21, 1975., (Mural 2: Chuck, Jim, Marlene – December 21, 1974) (2003), is now in the collection of the Museum of Modern Art. McCarty based her art works concerning Marlene Olive on the theory, presented by Riley's defense counsel and Levine, that Marlene Olive had beaten her mother Naomi to death with the hammer.

The barbecue murders were dramatized in a 2014 episode of the true crime documentary series Killer Kids titled "Please Kill For Me" (season 3, episode 12).

== See also ==
- List of homicides in California
- Murder of Tynesha Stewart
- Richardson family murders
