= Richard Levine =

Richard Levine may refer to:

- Richard Levine (architect), American environmental architect, solar energy and sustainability pioneer, and professor
- Richard Levine (filmmaker), American screenwriter, director, actor and producer
- Richard M. Levine, American journalist and author
- Richard Levine (character), a character in the Jurassic Park novel The Lost World
