= Abinader =

Abinader (Arabic: أبي نادر) is a surname which roughly translates to "my father is distinguished" in Arabic (see:Abimelech). Notable people with the surname include:

- Elmaz Abinader (born 1954), Arab-American author, poet, and academic
- José Rafael Abinader (1929–2018), Dominican politician, lawyer, and writer
- Luis Abinader (born 1967), Dominican economist, businessman, and politician
