= Kill Bill: Volume 1 =

2003 American film by Quentin Tarantino

- Theatrical release poster
- Directed by: Quentin Tarantino
- Written by: Quentin Tarantino
- Produced by: Lawrence Bender
- Starring: Uma Thurman; Lucy Liu; Vivica A. Fox; Daryl Hannah; Michael Madsen; David Carradine; Sonny Chiba; Julie Dreyfus; Chiaki Kuriyama
- Cinematography: Robert Richardson
- Edited by: Sally Menke
- Music by: RZA
- Production companies: A Band Apart; Shaw Brothers Studio; Super Cool ManChu
- Distributed by: Miramax Films
- Release date: October 10, 2003
- Running time: 110 minutes
- Countries: United States; Hong Kong
- Languages: English; Japanese
- Budget: $30 million
- Box office: $180.9 million

Kill Bill: Volume 1 is a 2003 American martial arts film written and directed by Quentin Tarantino. It stars Uma Thurman as the Bride, a mercenary who swears revenge on a group of assassins (Lucy Liu, Daryl Hannah, Vivica A. Fox and Michael Madsen) and their leader, Bill (David Carradine), after they try to kill her and her unborn child. Her mission takes her to Tokyo, where she battles the yakuza.

Kill Bill was inspired by 1970s exploitation films and martial arts films. It features an anime sequence by Production I.G and a black-and-white sequence. Volume 1 is the first of two Kill Bill films made in a single production; Volume 2 was released six months later. They were originally set for a single release, but the film, with a runtime of over four hours, was divided in two. This meant Tarantino did not have to cut scenes.

Kill Bill was theatrically released by Miramax Films in the United States on October 10, 2003. It received positive reviews and grossed $180.9 million worldwide on a $30 million budget, achieving the highest-grossing opening weekend of a Tarantino film to that point. A single film combining both parts, Kill Bill: The Whole Bloody Affair, was theatrically released on December 5, 2025.

== Plot ==
In 1999, the Bride, a former member of the Deadly Viper assassination squad, is rehearsing her marriage at a chapel in rural El Paso, Texas. The Deadly Vipers, led by Bill, attack the chapel, shooting everyone. As the Bride lies wounded, she tells Bill he is the father of her unborn child just as he shoots her in the head.

The Bride falls into a coma. In the hospital, Elle Driver, one of the Deadly Vipers, prepares to assassinate her via lethal injection. Bill aborts the mission at the last minute, as he considers it dishonorable to kill her while she is defenseless. The Bride awakens four years later and is horrified to discover she is no longer pregnant. She kills a man who intends to rape her, and a hospital worker who has been selling her body while she was comatose. She takes the hospital worker's truck and vows to kill Bill and the other Deadly Vipers.

The Bride goes to Okinawa to obtain a sword from the legendary swordsmith Hattori Hanzō, who has sworn never to forge a sword again. After learning that her target is Bill, his former student, he crafts his finest sword for her. The Bride travels to Tokyo to find another Deadly Viper, O-Ren Ishii, now the leader of the Tokyo yakuza. After witnessing the yakuza murder her parents when she was a child, O-Ren took vengeance on the yakuza boss and ultimately, replaced him after training as an elite assassin.

The Bride tracks O-Ren Ishii to a restaurant, where she mutilates O-Ren's French majordomo and lawyer, Sofie Fatale, by amputating her arm. The Bride defeats O-Ren's squad of elite fighters, the Crazy 88, and kills O-Ren's bodyguard, the schoolgirl Gogo Yubari. O-Ren and the Bride duel in the restaurant's Japanese garden. The Bride kills O-Ren by slicing off the top of her head. She tortures Sofie for information about the other Deadly Vipers, and leaves her alive as a threat. Bill finds Sofie and asks her if the Bride knows that her daughter is alive.

Then the Bride goes to the home of Vernita Green, a former Deadly Viper who now leads a normal suburban life. They engage in a knife fight, which is interrupted when Vernita's young daughter, Nakia, arrives home. When Vernita tries to shoot the Bride with a pistol hidden in a box of cereal, the Bride throws a knife into her chest, killing her. Realizing Nakia witnessed her mother's death, the Bride invites Nakia to find her when she's older if she still wants vengeance.

== Cast ==
- Uma Thurman as the Bride (code name Black Mamba), a former member of the Deadly Viper Assassination Squad, described as "the deadliest woman in the world".
- Lucy Liu as O-Ren Ishii (code name Cottonmouth), a former Deadly Viper who has become the leader of the yakuza in Tokyo.
  - Ai Maeda as O-Ren Ishii (anime sequence) (voice)
- Vivica A. Fox as Vernita Green (code name Copperhead), a former Deadly Viper and now a mother and homemaker living under the name Jeannie Bell.
- Daryl Hannah as Elle Driver (code name California Mountain Snake), a former Deadly Viper, Bill's lover and the Bride's fourth target. Elle is based on Madeline (Christina Lindberg) in They Call Her One Eye.
- Michael Madsen as Budd (code name Sidewinder), a former Deadly Viper and Bill's brother, working as a strip club bouncer. He is the Bride's third target.
- David Carradine as Bill (code name Snake Charmer), the former leader of the Deadly Vipers, the Bride's former lover, and the father of her daughter. He is an unseen character until Volume 2.
- Sonny Chiba as Hattori Hanzō, a sushi chef and long-retired master swordsmith.
- Chiaki Kuriyama as Gogo Yubari, O-Ren's sadistic Japanese schoolgirl bodyguard.
- Gordon Liu as Johnny Mo, head of O-Ren's personal army, the Crazy 88.
- Michael Parks as Ranger Earl McGraw, a Texas Ranger who investigates the wedding chapel massacre. Parks originated McGraw in the Robert Rodriguez film From Dusk till Dawn, which Tarantino wrote and acted in. He reprised the role in both segments of the Rodriguez/Tarantino collaboration Grindhouse. Parks also appeared in Volume 2 as a separate character, Esteban Vihaio.
- Julie Dreyfus as Sofie Fatale, O-Ren's French lawyer, confidante, majordomo, best friend and second lieutenant. She is also a former protégée of Bill's and is present at the wedding chapel massacre.
- Michael Bowen as Buck, an orderly at the hospital who has been raping and prostituting the Bride while she lay comatose.
- Jun Kunimura as Boss Tanaka, a yakuza whom O-Ren executes after he ridicules her ethnicity and gender.
- Kenji Ohba as Shiro, Hattori Hanzo's employee.
- Yuki Kazamatsuri as the Proprietress of the House of Blue Leaves.
- James Parks as Ranger Edgar McGraw, a Texas Ranger and son of Earl McGraw.
- Goro Daimon as Boss Honda
- Shun Sugata as Boss Genta
- Akaji Maro as Boss Ozawah
- Kazuki Kitamura as Boss Koji, a yakuza working for O-Ren. He also appeared as Bodyguard #2 in O-Ren's army, the Crazy 88.
- The 5.6.7.8's (Sachiko Fuji, Yoshiko Yamaguchi and Ronnie Yoshiko Fujiyama) as themselves, performing at the House of Blue Leaves.
- Jonathan Loughran as Buck's trucker client, killed by the Bride after he attempts to rape her.
- Sakichi Sato as "Charlie Brown", a House of Blue Leaves employee who wears a kimono similar to the shirt worn by the Peanuts character.
- Ambrosia Kelley as Nakia "Nikki" Bell, Vernita's four-year-old daughter.
- Yōji Tanaka as Crazy 88 #3
- Issey Takahashi as Crazy 88 #4
- Juri Manase as Crazy 88 #6
- Naomi Kusumi as Boss Matsumoto (anime sequence) (voice)
- Hikaru Midorikawa as Pretty Riki (anime sequence) (voice)

== Production ==
=== Writing ===
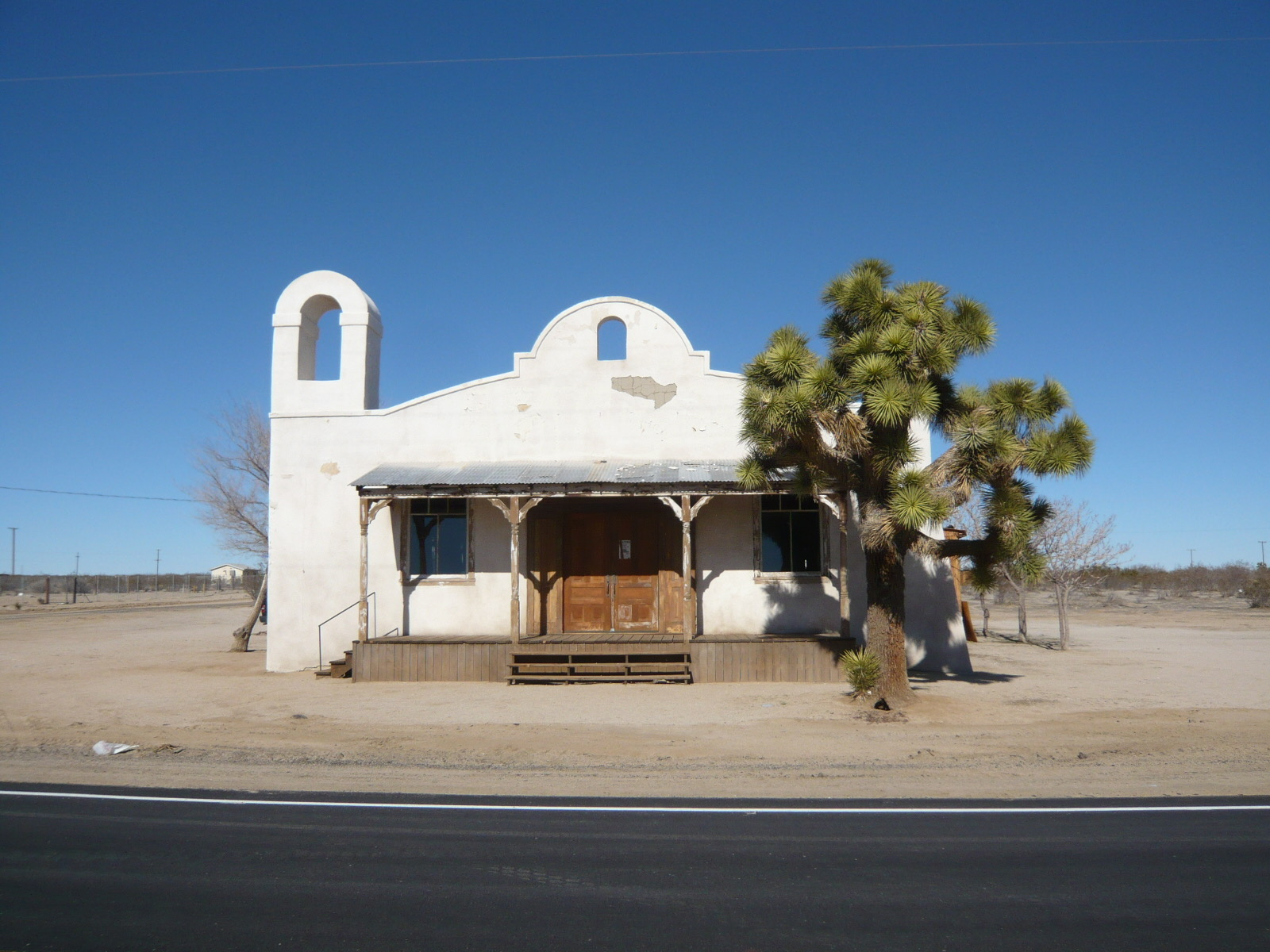
The chapel used in the opening sequence

Quentin Tarantino and Uma Thurman conceived the Bride character during the production of Tarantino's 1994 film Pulp Fiction; Kill Bill credits the Bride character to "Q & U". Tarantino spent a year and a half writing the script while he was living in New York City in 2000 and 2001, spending time with Thurman and her newborn daughter Maya. Reuniting with the more mature Thurman, now a mother, influenced the way Tarantino wrote the Bride character. He did not realize that her child could still be alive until the end of the writing process.

Tarantino developed many of the Bride's characteristics for the character of Shosanna Dreyfus in his 2009 film Inglourious Basterds, which he worked on before Kill Bill. Dreyfus was to be an assassin with a list of Nazis she would cross off as she killed. Tarantino switched the character to the Bride and redeveloped Dreyfus. Thurman cited Clint Eastwood's performance as Blondie in the 1966 film The Good, the Bad and the Ugly as an inspiration. In her words, Eastwood "says almost nothing but somehow manages to portray a whole character".

Tarantino originally wrote Bill for Warren Beatty, but as the character developed and the role required greater screen time and martial arts training, he rewrote it for David Carradine. Beatty said he turned the role down, as he did not want to be away from his family while shooting in China. Tarantino also considered Bruce Willis for the role. He cast Daryl Hannah as Elle Driver after seeing her performance in the television film First Target. The physical similarities between Thurman and Hannah inspired how he wrote the rivalry between the characters. Michelle Yeoh met with Tarantino about a role.

An early draft included a chapter set after the confrontation with Vernita in which the Bride has a gunfight with Gogo Yubari's vengeful sister Yuki. It was cut because it would have made the film overlong and added $1 million to the budget. Tarantino later adapted the chapter as the short animation The Lost Chapter: Yuki's Revenge, released in 2025. Another draft featured a scene in which the Bride's car is blown up by Elle Driver.

=== Filming ===
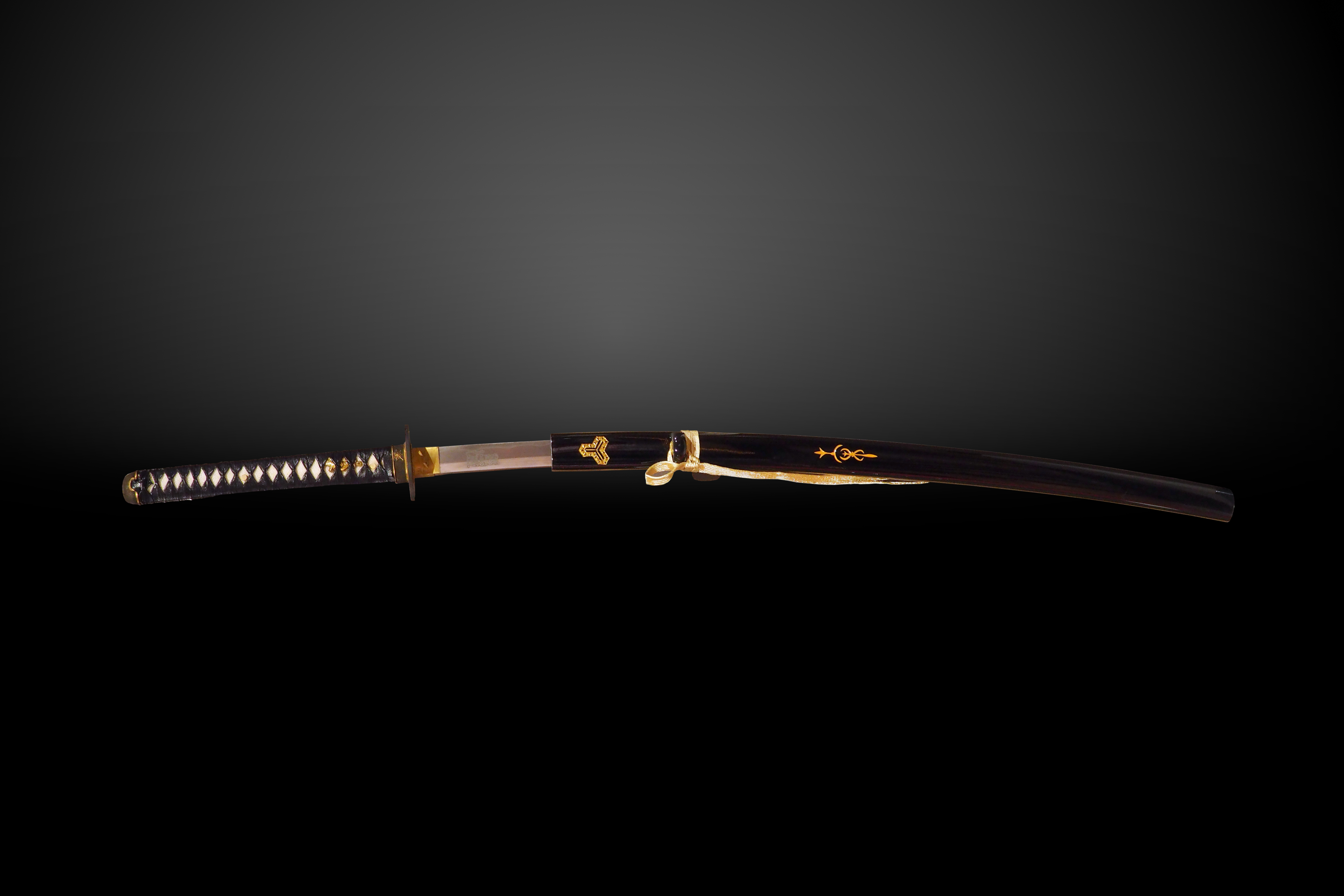
Reproduction of the katana used by the Bride

When Thurman became pregnant as shooting was ready to begin, Tarantino delayed the production, saying: "If Josef Von Sternberg is getting ready to make Morocco and Marlene Dietrich gets pregnant, he waits for Dietrich!" Principal photography began in 2002. Although the scenes are presented out of chronological order, the film was shot in sequence. The choreographer Yuen Woo-Ping, whose credits included The Matrix, was the martial arts advisor. The anime sequence, covering O-Ren Ishii's backstory, was directed by Kazuto Nakazawa and produced by Production I.G, which had produced films including Ghost in the Shell and Blood: The Last Vampire. The combined production lasted 155 days and had a budget of $55 million.

According to Tarantino, the most difficult part of making the film was "trying to take myself to a different place as a filmmaker and throw my hat in the ring with other great action directors", as opposed to the dialogue scenes he was known for. The House of Blue Leaves sequence, in which the Bride battles dozens of yakuza soldiers, took eight weeks to film, six weeks over schedule. Tarantino wanted to create "one of the greatest, most exciting sequences in the history of cinema". The crew eschewed computer-generated imagery in favor of practical effects used in 1970s Chinese cinema, particularly by the director Chang Cheh, including the use of fire extinguishers and condoms to create spurts and explosions of blood. Tarantino told his crew: "Let's pretend we're little kids and we're making a Super 8 movie in our back yard, and you don't have all this shit. How would you achieve this effect? Ingenuity is important here!"

Near the end of filming, Thurman was injured in a car crash while filming the scene in which she drives to Bill. According to Thurman, she was uncomfortable driving the car and asked that a stunt driver do it. Tarantino assured her that the car and road were safe. She lost control of the car and hit a tree, suffering a concussion and knee injuries. According to Thurman, Miramax would only give her the crash footage if she signed a document "releasing them of any consequences of [Thurman's] future pain and suffering". Tarantino was apologetic, but their relationship became bitter for years afterwards. Thurman said that after the car crash she "went from being a creative contributor and performer to being like a broken tool". Miramax released the footage in 2018 after Thurman went to police following the accusations of sexual abuse against the producer, Harvey Weinstein.

=== Editing ===
Kill Bill was planned and filmed as a single film. After editing began, Weinstein, who was known for pressuring filmmakers to shorten their films, suggested that Tarantino split the film in two. This meant Tarantino did not have to cut scenes, such as the anime sequence. Tarantino told IGN: "I'm talking about scenes that are some of the best scenes in the movie, but in this hurdling pace where you're trying to tell only one story, that would have been the stuff that would have had to go. But to me, that's kind of what the movie was, are these little detours and these little grace notes." The decision to split the film was announced in July 2003. Tarantino saved most of the Bride's character development for the second film, saying he wanted to make her scary rather than sympathetic for Volume 1. Tarantino opted to have the scene of the Bride meeting the Crazy 88s in black and white to avoid an NC-17 rating.

=== Music ===
The Volume 1 soundtrack includes music by the French-American disco group Santa Esmeralda, the Japanese garage rock group the 5.6.7.8's and the Japanese singer Meiko Kaji. The original score was composed by the American producer RZA.

== Influences ==
Kill Bill was inspired by exploitation films that played in cheap US theaters in the 1970s, including martial arts films, samurai cinema, blaxploitation films and spaghetti westerns. It pays homage to the Shaw Brothers Studio, known for its martial arts films, with the inclusion of the ShawScope logo in the opening titles and the "crashing zoom", a fast zoom usually ending in a close-up commonly used in Shaw Brothers films. The Bride's yellow tracksuit, helmet and motorcycle resemble those used by Bruce Lee in the 1972 martial arts film Game of Death.

The animated sequence pays homage to the anime ultraviolence shown in Golgo 13: The Professional (1983) as well as the urban gothic elements of Wicked City (1987). Tarantino stated in the supplementary material on the Kill Bill DVD that the character Hattori Hanzō was named in tribute to Sonny Chiba's former role as Hattori Hanzō (the historical 16th-century Iga ninja) in the 1980s Japanese TV series Shadow Warriors. Tarantino also referenced the horror film Goke, Body Snatcher from Hell (1968) by mirroring its opening sequence with an almost identical shot of a plane flying against a vivid, eerie red sky, which he filmed at a Japanese studio. For the Bride's arrival in Tokyo, the production repurposed the miniature Yokohama skyline from Godzilla, Mothra and King Ghidorah: Giant Monsters All-Out Attack (2001), redressing it to double as Tokyo. This homage was arranged by the production coordinator Shinji Higuchi, who worked on both films.

The Guardian wrote that Kill Bill's plot shares similarities with the 1973 Japanese film Lady Snowblood, in which a woman kills off the gang who murdered her family, and observed that like how Lady Snowblood uses stills and illustration for "parts of the narrative that were too expensive to film", Kill Bill similarly uses "Japanese-style animation to break up the narrative". The plot also resembles the 1968 French film The Bride Wore Black, in which a bride seeks revenge on five gang members and strikes them off a list as she kills them. According to Tarantino, the animated sequence was inspired by the 2001 Indian film Aalavandhan.

== Release ==
=== Theatrical ===
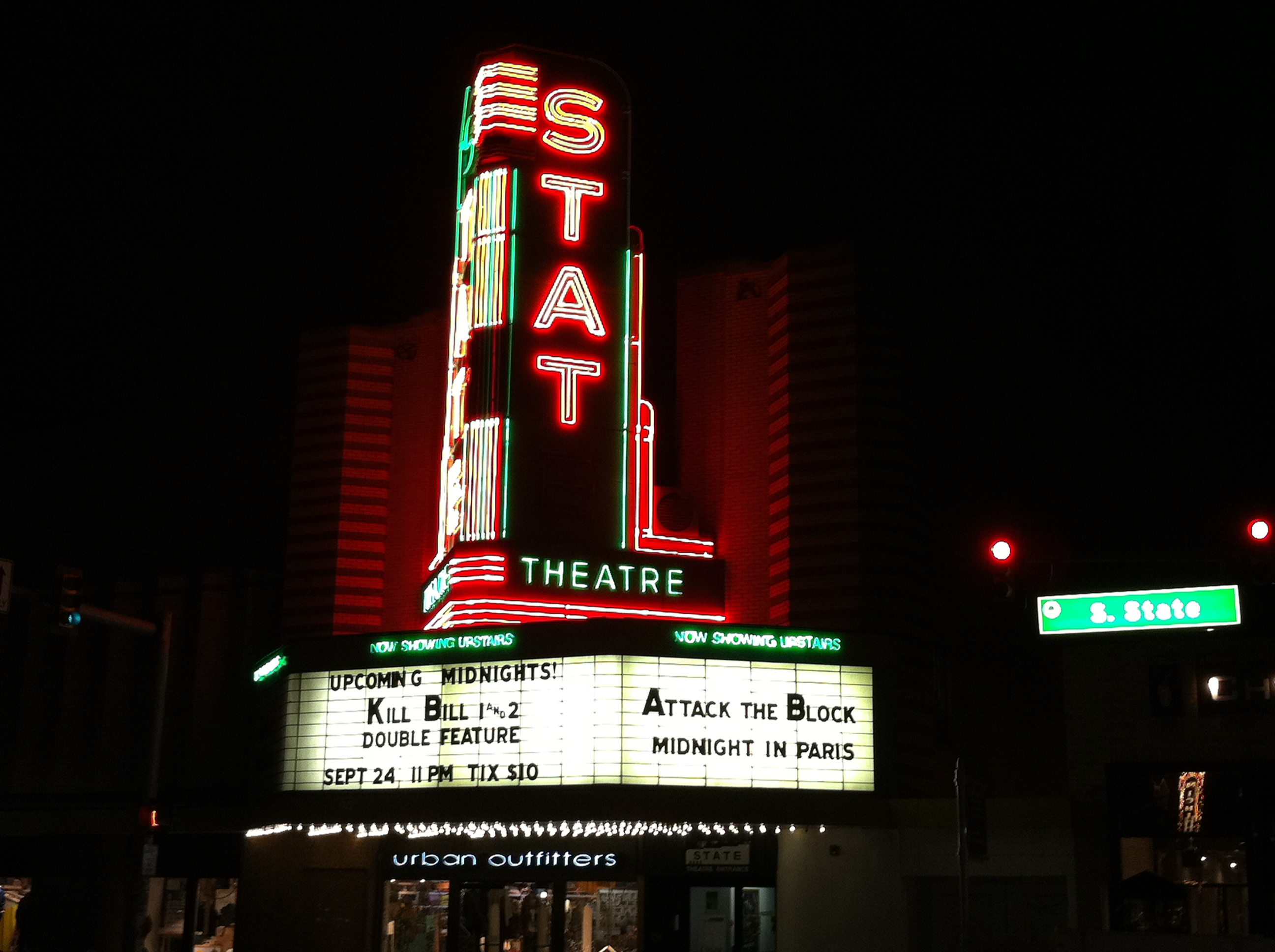
The State Theater (Ann Arbor, MI) shows a double feature of Kill Bill Volume 1 and Volume 2.

Kill Bill: Volume 1 was released in theaters on October 10, 2003. It was the first Tarantino film in six years, following Jackie Brown in 1997. In the United States and Canada, Volume 1 was released in 3,102 theaters and grossed $22 million on its opening weekend. Paul Dergarabedian, president of Exhibitor Relations, said Volume 1's opening weekend gross was significant for a "very genre specific and very violent" film that in the United States was restricted to theatergoers 17 years old and up. It ranked first at the box office, beating School of Rock (in its second weekend) and Intolerable Cruelty (in its first). Volume 1 had the widest theatrical release and highest-grossing opening weekend of a Tarantino film to date; Jackie Brown and Pulp Fiction (1994) had each grossed $9.3 million on their opening weekends. According to the studio, exit polls showed that 90% of the audience was interested in seeing the second Kill Bill after seeing the first.

Outside the United States and Canada, Kill Bill: Volume 1 was released in 20 territories. The film outperformed its main competitor Intolerable Cruelty in Norway, Denmark and Finland, though it ranked second in Italy. Volume 1 had a record opening in Japan, though expectations were higher due to the film being partially set there and because of its homages to Japanese martial arts cinema. It had "a muted entry" in the United Kingdom and Germany due to its 18 certificate, but "experienced acceptable drops" after its opening weekend in the two territories. By November 2, 2003, it had made $31 million in the 20 territories. It grossed a total of $70 million in the United States and Canada and $110.9 million in other territories for a worldwide total of $180.9 million. A single film combining both parts, Kill Bill: The Whole Bloody Affair, was theatrically released on December 5, 2025.

=== Home media ===
In the United States, Volume 1 was released on DVD and VHS on April 13, 2004, the week Volume 2 was released in theaters. In a December 2005 interview, Tarantino addressed the lack of a special edition DVD for Kill Bill by stating "I've been holding off because I've been working on it for so long that I just wanted a year off from Kill Bill and then I'll do the big supplementary DVD package." After one week of release, the film's DVD sales had surpassed its $70 million US box office gross.

The United States does not have a DVD boxed set of Kill Bill, though box sets of the two separate volumes are available in other countries, such as France, Japan and the United Kingdom. Upon the DVD release of Volume 2 in the US, however, Best Buy did offer an exclusive box set slipcase to house the two individual releases together. Volume 1, along with Volume 2, was released in High Definition on Blu-ray on September 9, 2008, in the United States. As of March 2012, Volume 1 sold 141,456 Blu-ray units in the US, grossing $1,477,791.

After Disney sold Miramax to Filmyard Holdings in 2010, the home media and streaming rights for both Kill Bill films were sold to Lionsgate, who reissued the Blu-ray and DVD releases on April 26, 2011. A limited edition steelbook release sold exclusively in Best Buy stores was released on November 24, 2013. Following Paramount Global's 49% stake in Miramax, the film was reissued on Blu-ray and DVD by Paramount Pictures Home Entertainment on September 22, 2020. In 2023, Lionsgate announced that they had purchased the distribution rights to both Kill Bill films, along with Jackie Brown, and announced a UHD release for the film's 20th anniversary; all three films were released on Blu-ray and DVD on October 10, 2023, and in 4K on physical and digital on January 21, 2025, with both Kill Bill films upscaled to 4K.

== Reception ==
On the review aggregator Rotten Tomatoes, Kill Bill: Volume 1 has a score of 85% based on reviews from 238 critics. Its consensus reads: "Kill Bill is admittedly little more than a stylish revenge thriller – albeit one that benefits from a wildly inventive surfeit of style." At Metacritic, which assigns a weighted average score 69 out of 100 based on 43 reviews from mainstream critics, indicating "generally favorable" reviews. Audiences polled by CinemaScore gave the film an average grade of "B+" on an A+ to F scale.

A. O. Scott of The New York Times wrote:

While being so relentlessly exposed to a filmmaker's idiosyncratic turn-ons can be tedious and off-putting, the undeniable passion that drives Kill Bill is fascinating, even, strange to say it, endearing. Mr. Tarantino is an irrepressible showoff, recklessly flaunting his formal skills as a choreographer of high-concept violence, but he is also an unabashed cinephile, and the sincerity of his enthusiasm gives this messy, uneven spectacle an odd, feverish integrity.

Manohla Dargis of the Los Angeles Times called Kill Bill: Volume 1 a "blood-soaked valentine to movies. ... It's apparent that Tarantino is striving for more than an off-the-rack mash note or a pastiche of golden oldies. It is, rather, his homage to movies shot in celluloid and wide, wide, wide, wide screen — an ode to the time right before movies were radically secularized." She also recognized Tarantino's technical talent, but thought the film's appeal was too limited to popular culture references, calling its story "the least interesting part of the whole equation". Roger Ebert of the Chicago Sun-Times gave it 4 out of 4, describing Tarantino as "effortlessly and brilliantly in command of his technique". He wrote: "The movie is not about anything at all except the skill and humor of its making. It's kind of brilliant."

Cultural historian Maud Lavin states that the Bride's embodiment of revenge taps into viewers' personal fantasies of committing violence. For audiences, particularly women viewers, the character provides a complex site for identification with one's own aggression.

=== Accolades ===
Uma Thurman received a Golden Globe Best Actress nomination in 2004. She was also nominated in 2004 for a BAFTA Award for Best Actress in a Leading Role, in addition with four other BAFTA nominations. Kill Bill: Volume 1 was placed in Empire Magazine's list of the 500 Greatest Films of All Time at number 325 and the Bride was also ranked number 66 in Empire magazine's "100 Greatest Movie Characters". In 2025, the film ranked number 61 on The New York Times' list of "The 100 Best Movies of the 21st Century" and number 48 on the "Readers' Choice" edition of the list.

Awards
Award	Category	Recipient(s)	Outcome
57th British Academy Film Awards
57th British Academy Film Awards	Best Actress	Uma Thurman	Nominated
57th British Academy Film Awards	Best Editing	Sally Menke	Nominated
57th British Academy Film Awards	Best Film Music	RZA	Nominated
57th British Academy Film Awards	Best Sound	Michael Minkler, Myron Nettinga, Wylie Stateman, and Mark Ulano	Nominated
57th British Academy Film Awards	Best Visual Effects	Tommy Tom, Kia Kwan, Tam Wai, Kit Leung, Jaco Wong, and Hin Leung	Nominated
9th Empire Awards
9th Empire Awards	Best Film	Kill Bill: Volume 1	Nominated
9th Empire Awards	Best Actress	Uma Thurman	Won
9th Empire Awards	Best Director	Quentin Tarantino	Won
9th Empire Awards	Sony Ericsson Scene of the Year	The House of the Blue Leaves	Nominated
61st Golden Globe Awards	Best Actress – Motion Picture Drama	Uma Thurman	Nominated
46th Grammy Awards	Best Compilation Soundtrack for Visual Media	Quentin Tarantino	Nominated
2004 MTV Movie Awards	Best Female Performance	Uma Thurman	Won
2004 MTV Movie Awards	Best Villain	Lucy Liu	Won
2004 MTV Movie Awards	Best Fight	Uma Thurman vs. Chiaki Kuriyama	Won
2003 Satellite Awards
2003 Satellite Awards	Best Art Direction/Production Design	Kill Bill: Volume 1	Nominated
2003 Satellite Awards	Best Original Screenplay	Quentin Tarantino and Uma Thurman	Nominated
2003 Satellite Awards	Best Sound	Kill Bill: Volume 1	Nominated
2003 Satellite Awards	Best Visual Effects	Kill Bill: Volume 1	Nominated
30th Saturn Awards
30th Saturn Awards	Best Action/Adventure Film	Kill Bill: Volume 1	Won
30th Saturn Awards	Best Actress	Uma Thurman	Won
30th Saturn Awards	Best Supporting Actor	Sonny Chiba	Nominated
30th Saturn Awards	Best Supporting Actress	Lucy Liu	Nominated
30th Saturn Awards	Best Director	Quentin Tarantino	Nominated
30th Saturn Awards	Best Screenplay	Quentin Tarantino	Nominated
30th Saturn Awards	Genre Face of the Future	Chiaki Kuriyama	Nominated

== Sequel ==
A direct sequel, Kill Bill: Volume 2, was released in April 2004. It continues the Bride's quest to kill Bill and the remaining members of the Deadly Viper Assassination Squad. Volume 2 was also a critical and commercial success, earning over $150 million.

== Legacy ==
Kill Buljo is a 2007 Norwegian parody of Kill Bill set in Finnmark, Norway, and portrays Jompa Tormann's hunt for Tampa and Papa Buljo. The film satirizes stereotypes of Norway's Sami population. According to the Norwegian newspaper Dagbladet, Tarantino approved of the parody. The Pussy Wagon made a cameo in the music video for Lady Gaga and Beyoncé's 2010 song "Telephone" at Tarantino's behest. The 2023 single "Kill Bill" by the American singer-songwriter SZA was inspired by the film. The 2026 single "Tarantino" by the Thai rapper and singer Lisa, was inspired by the director and the film.

== See also ==
- List of works by Quentin Tarantino
