= Vona =

Vona is both a surname and a given name. Notable people with the name include:

- Franco Vona (born 1964), Italian cyclist
- Gábor Vona (born 1978), Hungarian politician
- Vona Groarke, Irish poet

== See also ==
- Vona, Colorado, town in the United States
- Perşembe, a district center in Turkey (former name Vona)
- Voices of Our Nation Arts Foundation (VONA), a written arts organization
