= Ibrahim Fawal =

Palestinian-American academic, professor, and author (1933–2020)

Ibrahim Fawal (1933 - 2020) was a Palestinian-American academic, former professor, and author of the historical novel On the Hills of God, about the experiences of a young Palestinian man during the Nakba, or "catastrophe" of 1948. He lived in Birmingham, Alabama.

Fawal was born in Ramallah, Palestine in 1933. He later moved to the United States, where he earned a bachelor's degree from Birmingham–Southern College and a M.A. in film from UCLA. He worked as an assistant to director David Lean during the filming of Lawrence of Arabia in 1961, before returning to Birmingham, where he became a professor of film and literature at the University of Alabama at Birmingham.

In 1996, at the age of 63, Fawal began working on his Ph.D. at Oxford University in England. His thesis, on renowned Egyptian filmmaker Youssef Chahine, was published by the British Film Institute and University of California Press in 2001. Fawal's first novel, On the Hills of God, was published in 1998 and tells the story of the Palestinian Nakba, or "catastrophe", through the eyes of a young Palestinian man named Yousif Safi. It was the recipient of the PEN Oakland/Josephine Miles Literary Award, and has been translated into Arabic and German.

According to an editorial review by Patricia Keegan Holz of Washington International, Fawal was a Christian.
