= Lucille Lang Day =

American poet

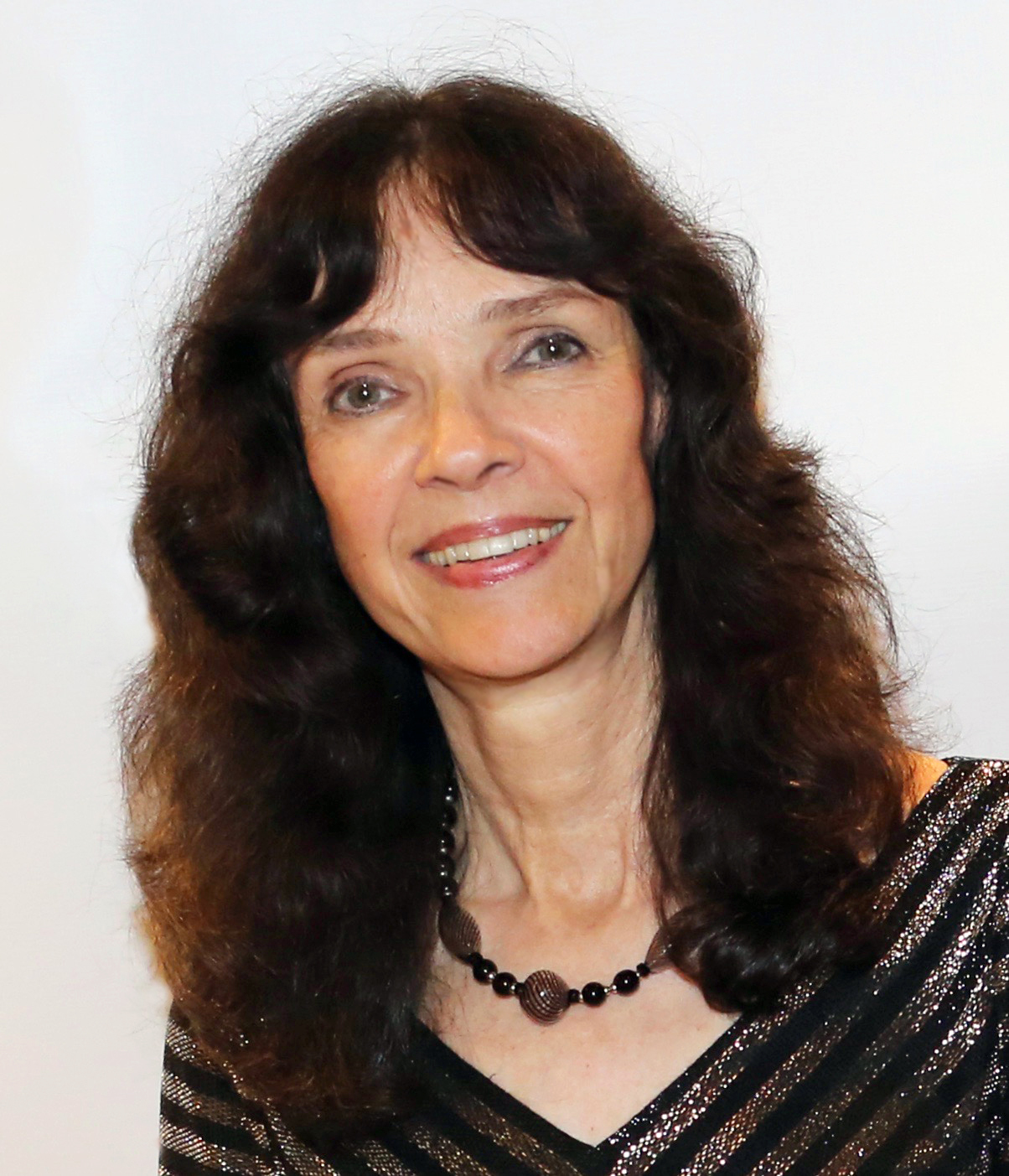
- Lucille Lang Day at AWP Conference, 2017
- Born: December 5, 1947 (age 78); Oakland, California
- Education: University of California, Berkeley (B.A., M.A., Ph.D.); San Francisco State University (M.A., MFA)
- Occupations: Poet; writer; science and health educator
- Website: lucillelangday.com

Lucille Lang Day (born December 5, 1947) is an American poet, writer, and science and health educator. Day has authored or edited 20 books and is a contributor to over 60 anthologies. She is best known as a poet and writer for her award-winning memoir, Married at Fourteen: A True Story, for her integration of science imagery and concepts into poetry and for advocating use of poetry as a tool in environmental activism. As a science and health educator, her many achievements have included promoting science education for girls and serving as codirector of Health and Biomedical Science for a Diverse Community, a project that was funded by the National Institutes of Health and aimed to make biomedical science more accessible to underrepresented minorities.

== Early life and education ==
Lucille Lang Day was born December 5, 1947, as Lucille Elizabeth Lang in Oakland, California, the only child of Richard Allen Lang and Evelyn Marietta Lang. Raised in Oakland and nearby Piedmont, California, she had a turbulent adolescence during which she married at age 14 and gave birth to her first child at age 15. She went on to earn a B.A. in biological sciences from the University of California, Berkeley, where she graduated Phi Beta Kappa with great distinction. She received her M.A. in zoology from the University of California, Berkeley, followed by her Ph.D. in science and mathematics education at the same university. Day also holds an M.A. in English and MFA in creative writing from San Francisco State University.

== Career ==
With Joan Skolnick and Carol Langbort, in 1982 Day coauthored How to Encourage Girls in Math and Science: Strategies for Parents and Educators. This book grew out of the Novato Math/Science Sex Desegregation Project, Novato Unified School District, Novato, California, where Day had worked as a math/science specialist from 1979 to 1981. During the 1980s, Day taught chemistry and biology at Laney College in Oakland, and worked as a science writer, administrator, and manager of precollege education programs at Lawrence Berkeley National Laboratory.

Serving from 1992 to 2009 as director of the Hall of Health, a museum in Berkeley that was sponsored by UCSF Benioff Children’s Hospital Oakland, she did research entitled “Prevention of Substance Abuse: Can Museums Make a Difference?" with Randi S. Cartmill, and she also conducted research to determine the "Impact of a Field Trip to a Health Museum on Children’s Health-related Behaviors and Perceived Control over Illness." Her research on "Teaching About Genetics and Sickle Cell Disease in Fifth Grade" was conducted as part of Health and Biomedical Science for a Diverse Community, which she co-directed with Bertram H. Lubin, M.D., President and CEO of Children’s Hospital Oakland, and which included the development and testing of a 40-lesson curriculum entitled SEEK (Science Exploration, Excitement, and Knowledge).

In the 1970s, Day joined a writers' collective, the Berkeley Poets Cooperative, whose members included such poets as Marcia Falk, Clive Matson, and Alicia Ostriker, and soon began publishing her poetry in such journals as The Hudson Review and The Threepenny Review. She has published hundreds of poems and dozens of essays, articles, and short stories in magazines and anthologies, often drawing on her background in science. Additional themes found in her poetry include history, ancestry, and motherhood. In 1999, she founded Scarlet Tanager Books, which publishes poetry, fiction, and literary nonfiction by West Coast writers. She is a member of PEN America, the National Association of Science Writers and the Association for the Study of Literature and Environment (ASLE). In 2020, she was elected to the PEN Oakland board of directors.

== Awards & honors ==
As a graduate student at the University of California, Berkeley, Day received a National Science Foundation Graduate Research Fellowship. In 1982, U.S. poet laureate (1997-2000) Robert Pinsky, along with David Littlejohn and Michael Rubin, selected her first poetry collection, Self-Portrait with Hand Microscope, for the Joseph Henry Jackson Award from the San Francisco Foundation. Day won the Blue Light Poetry Prize, a national award, in 2014 for Dreaming of Sunflowers: Museum Poems. Her memoir, Married at Fourteen: A True Story, won the national PEN Oakland Josephine Miles Literary Award in 2013 and was a finalist for the Northern California Book Award in Creative Nonfiction that same year. In 2017, she received a second PEN Oakland Josephine Miles Literary Award for Red Indian Road West: Native American Poetry from California, an anthology she coedited with Lakota poet Kurt Schweigman. Fire and Rain: Ecopoetry of California, which she co-edited with Ruth Nolan, was a finalist for the 2019 Eric Hoffer Award in Poetry, and has been widely praised by poets, scholars, and environmentalists. Both Red Indian Road West and Fire and Rain have received Literary/Cultural Arts Awards from Artists Embassy International.

== Personal life ==
Day was married to the late writer Richard Michael Levine, and they lived in Oakland, California. She has two daughters, Liana Sherrine Day and Tamarind Channah Fleischman, from previous marriages and four grandchildren. She is of Wampanoag, British, and Swiss/German descent.

== Bibliography ==
=== Science education ===
- How to Encourage Girls in Math and Science: Strategies for Parents and Educators (co-author with Joan Skolnick and Carol Langbort). Prentice Hall. 1982. (re-issued by Dale Seymour Publications, 1990). ISBN 978-0866513234
- SEEK (Science Exploration, Excitement, and Knowledge): A Curriculum in Health and Biomedical Science for Diverse 4th and 5th Grade Students (editor and project director). Children’s Hospital Oakland. 2010. ISBN 978-0982825204
- Family Health and Science Festival: A SEEK Event (editor and project director). Children’s Hospital Oakland. 2010. ISBN 978-0982825211

=== Poetry ===
- Self-Portrait with Hand Microscope. Berkeley Poets Workshop & Press. 1982. ISBN 978-0917658181
- Fire in the Garden. Mother’s Hen Press. 1997. ISBN 978-0914370727
- Wild One. Scarlet Tanager Books. 2000. ISBN 978-0967022437
- Infinities. Cedar Hill Publications. 2002. ISBN 978-1891812316
- The Curvature of Blue. Cervena Barva Press. 2009. ISBN 978-0-692-00181-3
- Becoming an Ancestor. Cervena Barva Press. 2015. ISBN 978-0-9861111-6-7
- Birds of San Pancho and Other Poems of Place. Blue Light Press. 2020. ISBN 978-1-4218-3664-5

=== Poetry chapbooks ===
- Lucille Lang Day: Greatest Hits, 1975-2000. Pudding House Publications. 2001. ISBN 978-1930755178
- The Book of Answers. Finishing Line Press. 2006. ISBN 978-1599240893
- God of the Jellyfish. Cervena Barva Press. 2007. ASIN B0028IF50W
- Dreaming of Sunflowers: Museum Poems. Blue Light Press. 2015. ISBN 978-1-4218-3739-0

=== Memoir ===
- Married at Fourteen: A True Story. Heyday Books. 2012. ISBN 978-1-59714-198-7

=== Children's books ===
- Chain Letter. Heyday Books. 2005. ISBN 978-1597140119
- The Rainbow Zoo. Scarlet Tanager Books. 2016. ISBN 978-0-9768676-6-1

=== Anthologies: editor ===
- Red Indian Road West: Native American Poetry from California (editor, with Kurt Schweigman). Scarlet Tanager Books. 2016. ISBN 978-0-9768676-5-4
- Fire and Rain: Ecopoetry of California (editor, with Ruth Nolan). Scarlet Tanager Books. 2018. ISBN 978-0-9768676-9-2
- Poetry and Science: Writing Our Way to Discovery (editor). Scarlet Tanager Books. 2021. ISBN 978-1734531336

=== Anthologies: contributor ===
- Spingarn, Lawrence, ed., Poets West: Contemporary Poets from the Eleven Western States. Perivale Press. 1975. ISBN 978-0912288055
- McDowell, Jennifer, and Loventhal, M., eds., Contemporary Women Poets: An Anthology of California Poets. Merlin Press. 1977. ISBN 978-0930142018
- Aal, Katharyn Machan, ed., Rapunzel, Rapunzel: Poems, Prose, and Photographs by Women on the Subject of Hair. McBooks Press. 1980. ISBN 978-0935526004
- Schwartz, Howard, and Rudolf, Anthony, eds., Voices Within the Ark: The Modern Jewish Poets. Avon Books. 1980. ISBN 978-0686776031
- Pater, Alan F., ed., Anthology of Magazine Verse & Yearbook of American Poetry, 1981 Edition. Monitor Book Company. 1981. ISBN 0-917734-05-X
- Reese, Lyn; Wilkinson, Jean; and Koppelman, Phyllis Sheon, eds., I’m On My Way Running: Women Speak on Coming of Age. 1983. Avon Books. ISBN 978-0380830220
- Frazier, Robert, ed., Burning with a Vision: Poems of Science and the Fantastic. Owlswick Press. 1984. ISBN 978-0913896228
- Gordon, Bonnie Bilyeu, ed., Songs from Unsung Worlds: Science in Poetry. Birkhauser. 1985. ISBN 978-0817632366
- Starkman, Elaine Marcus, and Schweitzer, Leah. Without a Single Answer: Poems on Contemporary Israel. Judah Magnes Museum. 1990. ISBN 978-0943376455
- Gilbert, Sandra, M.; Gubar, Susan; and O’Hehir, Diana, eds., Mother Songs: Poems for, by, and about Mothers. W.W. Norton. 1995. ISBN 978-0393037715
- Otten, Charlotte, ed., The Book of Birth Poetry. Bantam Books. 1995. ISBN 978-0553374490
- Carpenter, Jill, ed., Of Frogs and Toads: Poems & Short Prose Featuring Amphibians. Ione Press. 1998 ISBN 978-0966667400
- Hartman, Virginia, and Esstman, Barbara, eds., A More Perfect Union: Poems and Stories About the Modern Wedding. St. Martin’s Press. 1998. ISBN 978-0312185268
- Maltz, Wendy, ed., Intimate Kisses: The Poetry of Sexual Pleasure. New World Library. 2001. ISBN 978-1577314455
- Bosveld, Jennifer, ed., Fresh Water: Poems from the Rivers, Lakes, and Streams. Pudding House. 2002 ISBN 1-58998-082-4
- Cohen, Allen, and Matson, Clive, eds., An Eye for an Eye Makes the Whole World Blind: Poets on 9/11. Regent Press. 2002. ISBN 978-1587900341
- Heyen, William, ed., September 11, 2001: American Writers Respond. Etruscan Press. 2002. ISBN 978-0971822801
- Connors, Ginny Lowe, ed., Proposing on the Brooklyn Bridge: Poems About Marriage. Poetworks/Grayson Books. 2003. ISBN 978-0967555454
- Raeburn, Jane, ed., The Pagan’s Muse: Words of Ritual, Invocation, and Inspiration. Citadel. 2003. ISBN 978-0806524405
- Streeter, Deborah, ed., Dancing on the Brink of the World: Selected Poems of Point Lobos. Point Lobos Natural History Association. 2003. ISBN 978-0974095004
- Suntup, Paul, ed., So Luminous the Wildflowers: An Anthology of California Poets. Tebot Bach. 2003. ISBN 978-1893670136
- Gioia, Dana; Yost, Chryss; and Hicks, Jack, eds., California Poetry: From the Gold Rush to the Present. Santa Clara University and Heyday Books. 2004. ISBN 978-1890771720
- Hass, Robert, and Fisher, Jessica, eds., The Addison Street Anthology: Berkeley’s Poetry Walk. Heyday Books. 2004. ISBN 978-1890771942
- Clark, Morely, et al., eds., Cloud View Poets: An Anthology. Arctos Press. 2005. ISBN 978-0972538442
- Reid, John Howard, ed., Sailing in the Mist of Time: Award-Winning Poems. Tom Howard Books. 2007. ISBN 978-1847285836
- Shuck, Kim, and Brundage, Karla, eds., Oakland Out Loud: Poetry and Prose in Celebration of “There.” Jukebox Press. 2007. ISBN 978-0932693174
- Tosteson, Heather, and Brockett, Charles D., eds., Illness & Grace, Terror & Transformation. Wising Up Press. 2007 ISBN 978-0979655227
- Cary, Nancy, ed., Hunger and Thirst: Food Literature. San Diego City Works Press. 2008. ISBN 978-0981602042
- Hill, Jennifer, and Waber, Dan, eds., Poem, Home: An Anthology of Ars Poetica. Paper Kite Press. 2009. ISBN 978-0979847073
- Jaeger, Lowell, ed., New Poets of the American West. Many Voices Press. 2010. ISBN 978-0979518546
- Masek, Alys, and Mayhew, Kelly, eds. Mamas and Papas: On the Sublime and Heartbreaking Art of Parenting. San Diego City Works Press. 2010. ISBN 978-0981602080
- Azrael, Mary, and Kopelke, Kendra, eds., Burning Bright: Passager Celebrates 21 Years. Passager Books. 2011. ISBN 978-0983620907
- McAlister, Neil Harding, and McAlister, Zara, eds., Science Poetry. McAllister, Neil Harding. 2011.
- Weiss, Lenore, ed., From the Well of Living Waters: Voices of a 21st Century Synagogue. Kehilla Community Synagogue. 2011. ISBN 978-0615429595
- Hix, H.L., ed., Made Priceless: A Few Things Money Can’t Buy. Serving House Books. 2012. ISBN 978-0983828945
- Wattawa, Gayle, ed., New California Writing. Heyday. 2012. ISBN 978-1597141895
- Zawinski, Andrena, ed., Turning a Train of Thought Upside Down: An Anthology of Women's Poetry. Scarlet Tanager Books. 2012. ISBN 978-0976867623
- Ager, Deborah, and Silverman, M.E., eds., The Bloomsbury Anthology of Contemporary Jewish American Poetry. Bloomsbury. 2013. ISBN 978-1441188793
- Entrekin, Charles, ed., The Berkeley Poets Cooperative: A History of the Times. Hip Pocket Press. 2013. ISBN 978-0917658396
- Farrell, Kate; Myers, Linda Joy; and Starfire, Amber Lea, eds. Times They Were A-Changing: Women Remember the’60s and ’70s. She Writes Press. 2013. ISBN 978-1938314049
- Cody, Judith; McMillon, Kim; Ortalda, Claire, eds., Fightin’ Words: 25 Years of Provocative Poetry and Prose from “The Blue Collar PEN.” PEN Oakland Publications and Heyday Books. 2014. ISBN 978-0615967974
- Malatea, Jessi, ed., The Color of Being Born: Paintings by Michael Cadieux. Jaded Ibis Press. 2014. ISBN 978-0983195672
- Zaccardi, Joseph, ed., Changing Harm to Harmony: Bullies and Bystanders Project. Marin Poetry Center. 2015. ISBN 978-0976247838
- Zakariya, Sally, ed., Joys of the Table: An Anthology of Culinary Verse. Richer Resources Publications. 2015. ISBN 978-1634640367
- Ziman, Larry, and Sharples, Madeline, eds., The Great American Poetry Show, Volume 3. Eavesdropping on the Cosmos, LLC. 2015. ISBN 978-0933456266
- Barker, Wendy, and Parsons, Dave, eds., Far Out: Poems of the ‘60s. Wings Press. 2016. ISBN 978-1609405014
- Boxer, Nora, and Luce, Kelly, eds., Articulated Short Story Anthology 2016. Tayen Lane Publishing. 2016. ISBN 978-0997019698
- Scott, Whitney, ed., Home. Outrider Press. 2016. ISBN 978-0-9851768-3-9
- Spriggs, Bianca Lynne, and Stoykova-Klemer, Katerina, eds., Circe’s Lament: Anthology of Wild Women Poetry. Accents Publishing. 2016. ISBN 978-1936628414
- Chuc, Teresa Mei, ed., Nuclear Impact: Broken Atoms in Our Hands. Shabda Press. 2017 ISBN 978-0991577248
- Felver, Christopher, ed. and photographer, Tending the Fire: Native Voices and Portraits. University of New Mexico Press. 2017. ISBN 978-0826356451
- Scott, Whitney, ed., The Moon. Outrider Press. 2017. ISBN 978-0-9851768-4-6
- Savage, Stacy, ed., Celestial Musings: Poems Inspired by the Night Sky. Independently Published. 2018. ISBN 978-1791345969
- Silverstein, Murray, et al., eds., America, We Call Your Name: Poems of Resistance and Resilience. Sixteen Rivers Press. 2018. ISBN 978-1939639165
- Baugher, Janée J., The Ekphrastic Writer: Creating Art-Influenced Poetry, Fiction and Nonfiction. McFarland & Company, Inc. 2020. ISBN 978-1-4766-7945-7
- Frank, Diane, ed., Fog and Light: San Francisco through the Eyes of the Poets Who Live Here. Blue Light Press, 2021. ISBN 978-1-4218-3689-8
- Frank, Diane, and Sereno, Partho, eds., Pandemic Puzzle Poems. Blue Light Press, 2021. ISBN 978-1421837086
- Okemwa, Christopher, ed., Coming Out of Isolation: Poems on Resilience, Triumph and Hope. Verlag Expeditionen, 2022. ISBN 978-3-947911-73-8
- Schulkind, Laura, and Serchuck, Peter, eds., Poems from Lines Online: The Henry Miller Library Virtual Poetry Series, 2022.
- Brown, Kristina, et al., eds., Healing a Fractured World: Revolutionary Poets Brigrade. Kallatumba Press, 2023. ISBN 978-0-938392-17-0
- Satchidanandan, K., and Chawla, Nishi, eds., Greening the Earth: A Global Anthology of Poetry. Vintage/Penguin Random House, 2023. ISBN 978-0-143463214
- Brown, Kristina, et al., eds, For All: Revolutionary Poets Brigade. Kallatumba Press, 2024. ISBN 978-0-938392-18-7
- Krzywonos, Stephanie; Brown, Nikole; and Perez, Craig Santos, eds. Elementals: Fire, Vol. 4. Humans and Nature Press. 2024. ISBN 979-8986289663
- Reed, Ishmael, and Reed, Tennessee, eds., The Plague Edition of Konch Magazine. Ishmael Reed Publishing Company, 2024. ISBN 978-0-918408-39-6
- Tucker, Johnny M., Jr., ed., Love Is: Love Poems Vol. II. Independently Published. 2024. ISBN 979-8334921986
- Barrett, Virginia, ed., Blue: a Hue Are You Anthology. Jambu Press, 2025. ISBN 978-0-9824673-2-9
- Brown, Kristina, et al., eds, Riders of the Storm: Revolutionary Poets Brigade. Kallatumba Press, 2025. ISBN 978-0-938392-19-4
- Fisher-Wirth, Ann, and Street, Laura-Gray, eds., Attached to the Living World: A New Ecopoetry Anthology. Trinity University Press, 2025. ISBN 978-1-59534-308-6
- Igloria, Luisa A.; Cassinetto, Aileen; and Hassler, David, eds. The Nature of Our Times: Poems on America's Lands, Waters, Wildlife, and Other Natural Wonders. Paloma Press, 2025. ISBN 978-1-7344965-7-4
- Raab, Diana, and Yost, Chryss, eds. Women in a Golden State: California Poets at 60 and Beyond. Gunpowder Press, 2025. ISBN 978-1-957062-23-5
- Lockward, Diane, ed., The Color Wheel. Terrapin Books, 2026. ISBN 978-1-947896-90-1
