= Kim Shuck =

American poet

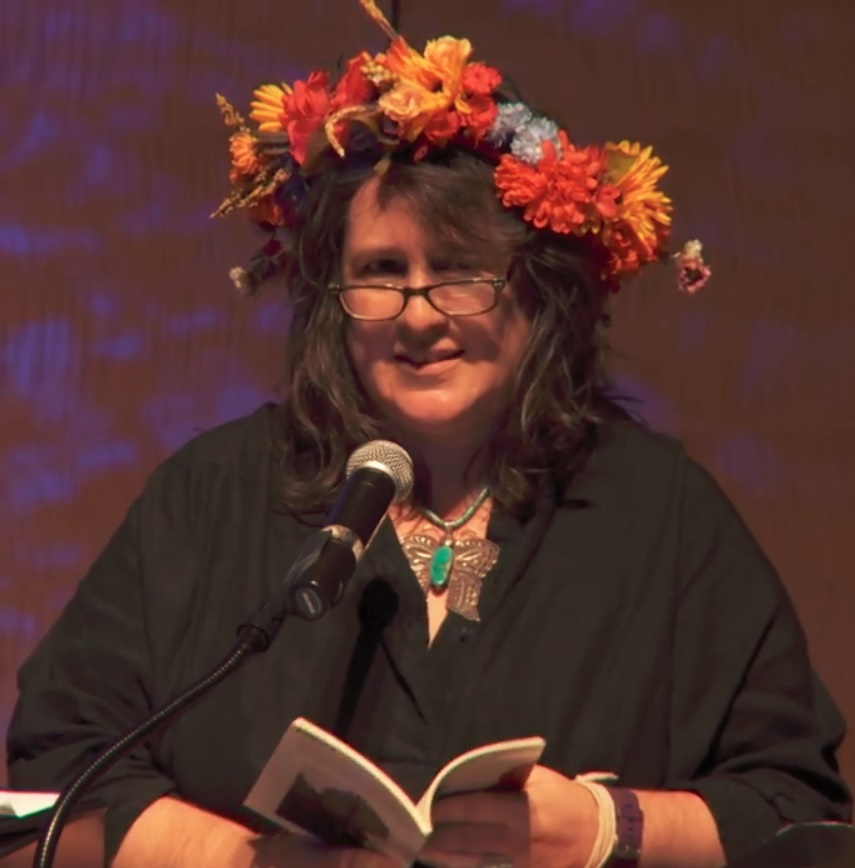
- Kim Shuck giving inaugural address as poet laureate of San Francisco in 2017
- Born: San Francisco, USA
- Occupations: Author, poet, artist, educator
- Writing career
- Genres: Poetry, non-fiction, fiction

Kim Shuck is a Cherokee Nation poet, author, weaver, and bead work artist who draws from Southeastern Native American culture and tradition as well as contemporary urban Indian life. She was born in San Francisco, California and belongs to the northern California Cherokee diaspora. She is an enrolled citizen of the Cherokee Nation of Oklahoma and also has Sac and Fox and Polish ancestry. She earned a B.A. in art (1994), and M.F.A. in Textiles (1998) from San Francisco State University. Her basket weaving work is influenced by her grandmother Etta Mae Rowe and the long history of California Native American basket making.

Kim does service on many boards, most recently as the interim President for the Cherokee Society of the Greater Bay Area, a satellite community of the Cherokee Nation of Oklahoma.

She has taught American Indian Studies at San Francisco State University and was an artist in residence at the de Young Museum in June 2010 with Michael Horse.

On June 21, 2017, Mayor Ed Lee named Shuck as the 7th poet laureate of San Francisco.

== Awards ==
- 2026 Alliance for Felix Cove Fellow
- 2022 COSTO Medal from University of California Riverside
- 2019 National Laureate Fellowship from the Academy of American Poets
- 2019 PEN Oakland Censorship Award
- 2008 KQED Local Hero Award, American Indian Heritage Month
- 2007 Smuggling Cherokee, Poetry Foundation bestseller list (March)
- 2006 Smuggling Cherokee, SPD Books bestseller list (March)
- 2005 Mentor of the Year Award Wordcraft Circle of Native Writers and Storytellers
- 2005 Native Writers of the Americas First Book, Diane Decorah Award
- 2004 Mary Tallmountain Award

== Grants ==
- 2025/2026 San Francisco Artist Grant
- 2022 Creative Work Fund Grant
- 2021 Individual Artist Grant from the San Francisco Arts Commission

== Bibliography ==
Author:

- 2026 November Dance Shirt solo volume of poems, Collapse Press ISBN 979-8-9898579-8-2
- 2024. Pick a Garnet to Sleep In Scapegoat Press, Lawrence Kansas, March 2024
- 2022 What Unseen Thing Blows Wishes Across my Surface, handmade art book with collages by Lisaruth Elliott
- 2022 Noodle, Rant, Tangent, Andover Street Archive Press, San Francisco,
- 2021 Exile Heart, That Painted Horse Press
- 2019 Murdered Missing , FootHills Publishing, Katona, NY,
- 2019 Deer Trails: San Francisco Poet Laureate Series No. 7, City Lights Publishers
- 2014 Sidewalk Ndn, solo chapbook of poetry, FootHills Publishing
- 2014 Clouds Running In, solo book of poetry, Taurean Horn Press ISBN 978-0931552168
- 2013 Rabbit Stories, vignette fiction, Poetic Matrix Press ISBN 978-0985288389
- 2010 Over and Out past the lines, De Young Museum, San Francisco, CA, limited edition chapbook
- 2005 Smuggling Cherokee, solo volume of poems, Greenfield Review Press ISBN 978-0878861460

Co Author: 2024 Deer/A-wi, Mammoth Publications, Healdsburg, CA, Denise Low, Kim Shuck

Co- Author: 2026 American Indian Stories/ The Language of String, Aunt Lute Press

Editor:

- 2026 This Music Record of a Poet Becoming, co-editor, University of Arizona Press ISBN 9780816556458
- 2023 This Wandering State: Poems from Alta v.1 San Francisco ed. Kim Shuck, San Francisco
- 2023 "Home in the Bay, Aunt Lute Press, ebook, ed. Emma Rosenberg, Kim Shuck,San Francisco
- 2022 "Beat Not Beat" ed. Rich Ferguson, S.A. Griffin, Alexis Rhone Fancher, Kim Shuck
- 2010 "Rabbit and Rose", online journal, editor, online publication (http://www.rabbitandrose.com/)
- 2007 Oakland Out Loud, (Ed.) anthology, co-editor, Jukebox Press ISBN 0932693172
- 2006 Words Upon the Waters, (Ed.) anthology, assistant editor, Jukebox Press 2006
- 2020 The City is Already Speaking Volume 4. Editorial team Kim Shuck, Denise Sullivan,San Francisco Plum Blossoms
- 2019 TheCity is Already Speaking Volume 3, Editorial team Denise Sullivan, Thea Matthews, and Kim Shuck, San Francisco, Dishtowels
- 2018 The City is Already Speaking Volume 2, editorial team Denise Sullivan, Thea Matthews, and Kim Shuck, San Francisco,

GRANTS: 2025 San Francisco Artist Grant, 2025/2026 2022 Creative Work Fund Grant 2021 Individual Artist Grant from the San Francisco Arts Commission, 2021

== Links ==
- https://www.jstor.org/stable/27361554
- https://journals.kent.ac.uk/index.php/transmotion/article/view/277/914
- https://thebloom.news/two-poems-by-kim-shuck/
- https://sfpl.org/books-and-media/san-francisco-poet-laureate/poem-of-the-day/poem-day-archive
- https://poets.org/poet/kim-shuck
- https://www.cca.edu/newsroom/inaugural-diversity-studies-faculty-exhibition-features-two-weeks-celebratory-events/
- https://boomcalifornia.com/2018/11/28/a-boom-conversation-at-the-edge-of-the-world/
- https://datebook.sfchronicle.com/books/stringing-together-stories-in-a-tribute-to-native-traditions
- https://www.smithsonianmag.com/smithsonian-institution/san-francisco-early-days-statue-gone-now-comes-work-activating-real-history-180970462/
- http://www.sfexaminer.com/word-weaver-kim-shuck-fights-back-one-poem-one-statue-time/
- http://lca.sfsu.edu/lcanews/2017/06/23/817039-alum-kim-shuck-named-poet-laureate-san-francisco
- https://denisesullivan.com/2017/06/21/congratulations-kim-shuck/
- http://osiyo.tv/segments/san-francisco-poet-laureate-kim-shuck/
- https://www.kqed.org/arts/13817884/six-bay-area-writers-share-their-new-years-resolutions
- https://magazine.sfsu.edu/fall-17/alumni-friend
- https://www.worldliteraturetoday.org/2017/may/new-native-writing-video-playlist-25-authors
- http://www.castrocourier.com/june-2016.html
- https://artsinthevalley.wordpress.com/tag/native-american-poet-kim-shuck/
- https://www.bbc.co.uk/mediacentre/proginfo/2013/34/r4-w34-poetry-gold-s
- https://poets.org/poem/we-always-have-been
- https://www.ebar.com/story/51355
