= Q. R. Hand Jr. =

American poet (1937–2020)

Q. R. Hand
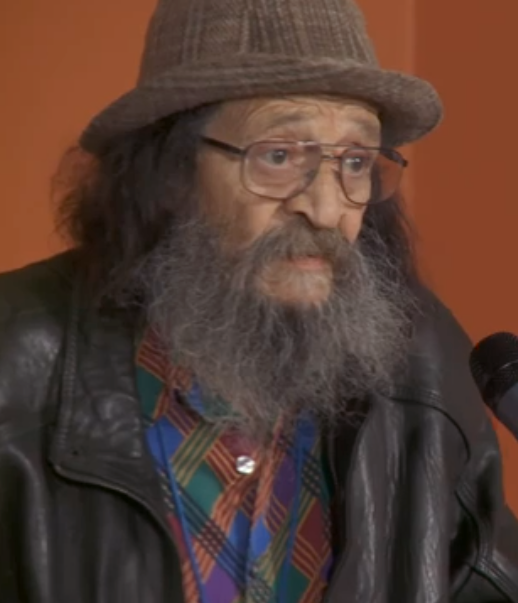
- Reading at the San Francisco Public Library in 2018
- Born: Quentin Roosevelt Hand Jr. 1937; Brooklyn, New York, US
- Died: December 31, 2020 (aged 83)
- Occupation: Poet

Quentin Roosevelt Hand Jr. (1937 – December 31, 2020), known professionally as Q. R. Hand, was an African-American poet.

== Biography ==
Quentin Roosevelt Hand Jr. was born in Brooklyn, New York, in 1937. His father, Dr. Quentin Roosevelt Hand, a native of Savannah, Georgia who was educated at Columbia, operated Hand's Ethical Pharmacy in Harlem, and his mother, Catherine Elizabeth Chestnut, was a writer. His parents married in 1935, and the family lived in the Bedford–Stuyvesant neighborhood. Q. R. Hand Jr. had two younger siblings, a brother named John and a sister named Margaret. He was educated at Northfield Mount Hermon in Massachusetts, and briefly attended Amherst College in 1954. He moved to San Francisco's Mission District, performing in the local poetry scene and working as a mental health counselor for the Progress Foundation. His poetry was influenced by his work in the Black liberation movement and his love of jazz, and is considered part of the San Francisco Renaissance and Beat poetry movements. He played saxophone, and performed spoken word with musical accompaniment as a member of the Word Wind Chorus with Brian Auerbach, Lewis Jordan, and Reginald Lockett. Hand co-authored an anti-war play with Nayo-Barbara Malcolm Watkins and John O'Neal entitled Ain't No Use in Goin' Home, Jodie's Got Your Gal and Gone about the Black military experience. Stage productions included the Black Box Theatre at Cornell in 1988, Wake Forest University in 1989 in Winston-Salem, the Oakland Ensemble Theatre in 1989 and 7 Stages Theatre in Atlanta in 1990. Aaron Noble painted Hand's poem "Hemisphere" on 40 Clarion Alley in 1995 as part of the Clarion Alley Mural Project. Hand received the PEN Oakland Lifetime Achievement Award in 2012.

Across his career he was a featured act at many venues including the Sonoma County Book Festival, the Bay Area Poets and Music Festival at GLIDE, the Petaluma Poetry Walk, Cafe Babar, the Sacramento Poetry Center, the Beat Museum, San Francisco Metropolitan Arts Center, Oakland Arts Festival, the Roque Dalton Cultural Brigade, and Golden Gate Park. Hand moved to Vallejo, California, in 2003 where he performed his poetry at local venues like Listen and Be Heard and KZCT. Hand died in Vallejo on December 31, 2020, at age 83 from cancer. He was honored posthumously at the 2022 Vallejo Beat Poetry Festival.

== Awards ==
- PEN Oakland's Reginald Lockett Lifetime Achievement Award (2012)
- Lifetime Achievement Award in Poetry by New Pacific Studio

== Works ==
=== Collections ===
- I Speak to the Poet in Man Jukebox Press. 1985.
- How Sweet It Is Zeitgeist Press. 1996. ISBN 978-0929730554
- Whose Really Blues: New & Selected Poems Taurean Horn Press. 2007. ISBN 9780931552137
- Out of Nothing Black Freighter Press. 2021.

=== Editor ===
- Hand, Q.R., and Ross, John, We Came to Play: Writings on Basketball North Atlantic Books. 1996. ISBN 9781556431623

=== Contributor ===
- Black Fire: An Anthology of Afro-American Writing William Morrow & Company. 1968.
- New American Underground Poetry, Vol 1: The Babarians of San Francisco - Poets from Hell Trafford Publishing, 2005 ISBN 9781412052702
- Sparring With Beatnik Ghosts Omnibus Mystic Boxing Commission. 2022. ISBN 9781733548113

=== Music albums ===
- We Are of the Saying - Word Wind Chorus

=== Plays ===
- Ain't No Use in Goin' Home, Jodie's Got Your Gal and Gone: Sayings from the Life and Writing of Junebug 'Jabbo' Jones, Vol. III
