= Koon Woon =

American poet

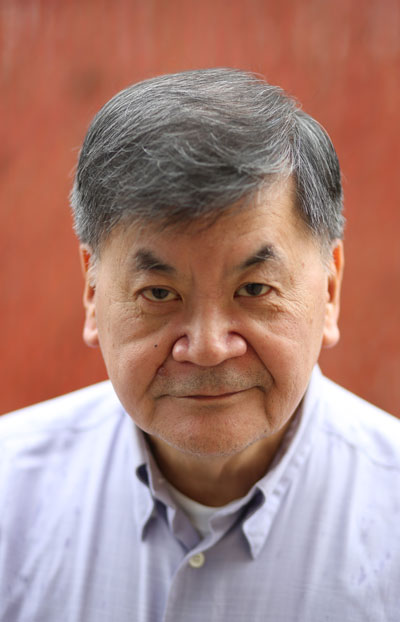
Koon Woon

Koon Woon is a Chinese-American poet, editor, student of mathematics, philosophy, and modal logic, and mentor based in Chinatown, Seattle, Washington. His poetry is internationally-anthologized.

== Early life ==
Woon was born into a large family in a small village near Guangzhou, China, in 1949. Then, in 1960, he with his family immigrated to the United States.

== Education ==
During the late 1960s to early 1970s, Woon attended the University of Washington, enrolled in courses in the Department of Mathematics and the Department of Philosophy. He then transferred to the University of Oregon, where John Wisdom was influential.

After recovering from mental illness lasting two decades, he went to Antioch University Seattle and got a bachelor's degree. Then, Woon attended Fort Hays State University and got a master's degree.

== Literary work ==
Woon has published two books of poetry, and self-published two memoirs. He edits Chrysanthemum and Five Willows Literary Review.

== Awards ==
He is winner of Pen Oak / Josephine Miles Award and an American Book Award.

== Publications ==
- Woon, K. (1998). The Truth in Rented Rooms. Los Angeles: Kaya Press. ISBN 9781885030252
- Woon, K. (2013). Water Chasing Water. Los Angeles: Kaya Press. ISBN 9781885030498
- Woon, K. (2016). Paper-son Poet: When rails were young.... Seattle: Goldfish Press. ISBN 9780692689165
- Woon, K. (2018). Rice Bowls: Previously Uncollected Words of Koon Woon. Seattle: Goldfish Press. ISBN 9780971259881
