= Prince Richard =

Prince Richard may refer to:

- Richard of Shrewsbury, Duke of York (1473–c. 1483)
- Prince Richard von Metternich (1829–1895), from the German House of Metternich
- Richard, 4th Prince of Sayn-Wittgenstein-Berleburg (1882–1925), from the German House of Sayn-Wittgenstein
- Prince Richard of Hesse (1901–1969), from the German House of Hesse
- Prince Richard of Sayn-Wittgenstein-Berleburg (1934–2017), from the German House of Sayn-Wittgenstein
- Prince Richard, Duke of Gloucester (born 1944)

== See also ==
- Richard Prince (disambiguation)
- Princess Richard, wife of Prince Richard, Duke of Gloucester
