= Adam David Miller =

American writer (1922–2020)

Adam David Miller (October 8, 1922 – November 4, 2020) was an American poet, writer, publisher, and radio programmer and producer. Born in Branchville, South Carolina, Miller published one of the first collections of modern African-American poetry, as well as five books of poetry and two memoirs, including Ticket to Exile about his life growing up in the Jim Crow South. He died in November 2020 at the age of 98.

== United States Navy ==
Miller served in the United States Navy from 1942 -1946. He attended university on the G.I. Bill, earning a master's degree in English (1953) from the University of California at Berkeley where he also completed post-degree work in drama and helped found the university's Graduate Student Journal.

Throughout his career, Miller has promoted and published other writers. In Dices, or Black Bones, (1970), he showcased the early poems of Al Young, California's poet laureate (2005–2008), Ishmael Reed, Clarence Major, Lucille Clifton, Etheridge Knight and Victor Hernandez Cruz. Miller's own first book of poetry was Neighborhood and Other Poems (1992), followed by Forever Afternoon (1994) published by Michigan State University Press; next came Apocalypse Is My Garden (1997) and Land Between (2000). Ticket to Exile, A Memoir (2007) was published by Heyday Books.

== Laney College ==
Miller taught English for 21 years at Laney College in Oakland, California where he helped create Good News, a faculty and community journal of art and culture. He continued to teach at UC Berkeley until 1991 and has twice been an Invited Fellow with the Bay Area Writing Project (1978 and 1994). For six years, Miller served on the Berkeley Arts Commission and helped inaugurate the downtown “Poetry Walk.”

== Publishing ==
In the 1960s, Miller helped launch Aldridge Players West, a Black drama group in San Francisco. He also created Mina Press which brought out Japanese American Women: Three Generations by Mei T. Nakano in 1990, as well as other works. He has worked with San Francisco Bay Area public television and radio for over 30 years, creating programs on Norwegian culture and arts, the writings of Nisei (Japanese-Americans), women's history and labor history. He has been a regularly featured poet on listener-sponsored KPFA, 94.1 FM radio in Northern California.

Miller was married to Elise Peeples, philosopher and author of The Emperor Has a Body, and founder of Art Between Us, a collaborative art and healing organization. They made their home in Berkeley, California.

== Awards and honors ==
- 1994 Naomi Long Madgett Poetry Award for Forever Afternoon
- 2007 San Francisco Chronicle "Best Book of the Year" for Ticket to Exile
- 2007 Northern California Book Reviewers Association nomination for best nonfiction book for Ticket to Exile
- 2011 PEN Oakland/Reginald Lockett Lifetime Achievement Award

== Bibliography ==
- Dices, or Black Bones, editor (1970)
- Neighborhood and Other Poems (1993)
- Forever Afternoon, which won the Naomi Long Madgett Award from Michigan State University (1994)
- Apocalypse is My Garden (1997)
- Land Between: New and Selected Poems (2000)
- Ticket To Exile, A Memoir (2007)
- The Sky Is a Page: New and Selected Poems (2010)
- Fall Rising: Exile to Odyssey (2015)
