= Lewis Robinson =

American author

Lewis Robinson is an American author. His first book, Officer Friendly and Other Stories, was published by HarperCollins in 2003, and his second book, the novel Water Dogs, was published by Random House in 2009. A graduate of Middlebury College and the Iowa Writer's Workshop. Currently, he teaches creative writing at the University of Maine at Farmington.

== Life and career ==
Lewis Robinson was born in Natick, Massachusetts, and grew up in Maine. He attended Middlebury College and later, the prestigious Iowa Writers' Workshop, where he was a teaching-writing fellow. He has taught fiction writing at Colby College, Stanford University Continuing Studies, and was the writer-in-residence at Phillips Academy, Andover, and is currently on the faculty at University of Maine at Farmington

Robinson was a 2003 recipient of the Whiting Award, and a 2004 recipient of the PEN Oakland/Josephine Miles Award Additionally, he has written for Sports Illustrated and The New York Times. His short stories have appeared in various publications, including Tin House, The Missouri Review, The Baffler, Open City, as well as being featured on the NPR program Selected Shorts. In March 2020, his short story "QE2" was nominated for a Pushcart Prize.

Robinson hosts the podcast Talk Shop, for which he interviewed writers such as Nicholson Baker, Richard Russo, Sara Corbett, Phuc Tran, Monica Wood, Brock Clarke, and others.

== Works ==
Novels

- Water Dogs (2009)

Short Story Collections

- Officer Friendly and Other Stories (2003)

Anthologies

- Before: Short Stories About Pregnancy From Our Top Writers (2006)
- The Encyclopedia of Exes: 26 Stories by Men of Love Gone Wrong (2005)
- Contemporary Maine Fiction (2005)
- The Way Life Should Be (2005)
