= Murder of Tynesha Stewart =

2007 murder in Texas, United States

- Family Photo of Tynesha Stewart
- Date: March 15, 2007; 19 years ago
- Time: c. 3:30 p.m. (EDT)
- Location: 17710 Red Oak #224 Harris County, Texas; 29.86°N 95.39°W
- Cause: Choking and dismemberment
- Deaths: 1
- Coroner: Harris County Medical Examiner
- Convicted: Timothy Wayne Shepherd
- Charges: First-degree murder
- Verdict: Guilty
- Sentence: 99 years in prison and $10,000 fine

Tynesha Stewart (July 10, 1987 to March 15, 2007) was a 19-year-old student who was murdered on March 15, 2007, by her 27-year-old former boyfriend Timothy Wayne Shepherd when she came home for spring break as she had started a new relationship. Stewart was a first year student at Texas A&M University studying civil engineering. Tynesha was the niece of NFL players Aaron Glenn & Jason Glenn.

== Investigation ==
Shepherd committed the crime at his apartment at 17710 Red Oak Dr #224 in northwest Harris County, Texas. Prosecutors believe that he disposed of Stewart's body by burning it on his two barbecue grills on the balcony of his second floor apartment. This reportedly took 2–3 days to complete. One of the two grills belonged to James Hebert who often played video games and barbecued with Shepherd. Since they barbecued together frequently, Hebert kept his grill on Shepherd's balcony along with Shepherd's smoker. Dionne Whitaker, a neighbor whose patio is directly across from Shepherd's, saw him carry the two grills to the dumpster after days of intensive burning. Other witnesses in the case include Shepherd's cousin, whom Shepherd told prior to the murder that he "could get away with killing someone". In another witness report, Shepherd also stated that he would "boil someone and eat them up".

When initially questioned for 10 hours by the police, Shepherd refused to discuss Stewart's disappearance. Afterwards, he spoke with activist Quanell X, whom officers credit with helping to obtain a confession. Quanell informed Shepherd that the police would look for incriminating forensic evidence if he was involved. Shepherd started to cry as the two spoke and later led Quanell X and a detective to a trash can where he stated he left the body. When no body was found in the trash container, Shepherd confessed to the murder. However, investigators did discover Stewart's teeth in the disposal.

Shepherd was held in the Harris County Jail on a $250,000 bond.

== Trial ==
Jury selection for Shepherd's trial began on September 29, 2008. During the trial, Shepherd's neighbor Dionne Whitaker remembered the smell as being "worse than the smell of singed hair or burning tires". When Whitaker asked Shepherd about the smell at the time, Shepherd answered it was "the spices". Quanell, who also testified as a witness, stated Shepherd told him, "They're going to kill me, man. They're going to give me the death penalty." Additionally, Stewart's younger sister called Shepherd "controlling", and expanded her statement by telling an incident where Shepherd physically shook Tynesha out of anger after she picked up a cell phone call.

Shepherd's defense attorney, Chip Lewis, argued that Shepherd's constitutional right to a lawyer was violated since he had asked for one prior to confessing. He planned on the judge ruling that the confession was illegally retrieved and could not be used as evidence to convict Shepherd. However, the judge ruled that Shepherd had waived his rights thus allowing the jury to hear the confession.

Shepherd was convicted of the crime on October 9, 2008, after jurors deliberated for four hours. He was given the maximum sentence of 99 years in prison and a $10,000 fine. During the punishment phase of the trial, Shepherd stated that he had murdered Stewart, after first pressuring her to reveal her new relationship at college. He claimed that she had refused to answer, grabbed a knife from a table, and approached him with it in her hand; she swung at him with the knife and nicked his fingers. Afraid she was going to stab him again, Shepherd claimed to have then grabbed her around the neck with one arm, while he tried to reach the knife with his other hand, then choked her to death out of anger. He later went to the hardware store to purchase a jigsaw. He undressed Stewart's body and dismembered it in his bathtub using the jigsaw and other tools. He barbecued her remains on two grills on his patio.

== See also ==
- Barbecue murders
