= Tony R. Rodriguez =

American novelist

Tony R. Rodriguez is an American novelist residing in the Bay Area of California. He is the former board chairman of the literary collective PEN Oakland, a chapter of Pen America Center, which is an affiliate of PEN International. His novels have been published in Scotland and the United States of America. They include the best-selling titles Under These Stars (Beatdom Books, 2014) and When I Followed the Elephant (Cauliay Publishing and Distribution, 2011). His books have been studied at various high schools and universities, including the University of Texas Rio Grande Valley, formerly known as the University of Texas-Pan American. Rodriguez has also been published in various anthologies and literary journals. His works have been widely reviewed, especially through the East Bay Review, View From Here magazine, as well as local Bay Area press. Rodriguez has been featured in many Bay Area literary festivals, including LitQuake, the Oakland Book Festival and 100,000 Poets for Change.

== Bibliography ==
Novels

- Under These Stars (Beatdom Books, 2014)
- When I Followed the Elephant (Cauliay Publishing and Distribution, 2011)

Anthologies

- Fightin’ Words (Heyday Books, 2015)
- Beatitude Golden Anniversary: 1959-2009
