= Julie Shigekuni =

American writer and professor (born 1962)

- Born: 1962 (age 63–64); Panorama City, Los Angeles, California, US
- Education: Hunter College (BA); Sarah Lawrence College (MFA)
- Occupations: Writer; professor
- Writing career
- Genres: Fiction; novel
- Notable works: A Bridge Between Us; Unending Nora
- Notable awards: PEN Oakland/Josephine Miles Literary Award

Julie Shigekuni (born 1962) is an American writer and professor. Her novels include A Bridge Between Us, Invisible Gardens, Unending Nora, and In Plain View, and she has won a PEN Oakland/Josephine Miles Literary Award. She is Professor of Creative Writing at the University of New Mexico.

== Early life and education ==
Julie Shigekuni was born in 1962 in the Panorama City neighborhood of Los Angeles, California. She is a fifth-generation Japanese-American. As a teenager she lived in Japan and worked for a newspaper in Tokyo. She attended the University of California, Santa Cruz, Friends World College (Tokyo, London), CUNY City College and later earned her B.A. from Hunter College, and in 1990 received her M.F.A. in fiction from Sarah Lawrence College.

== Career ==
Shigekuni's first novel, A Bridge Between Us, was published by Anchor Books in 1995. The book tells the story of four generations of a Japanese-American family full of what the New York Times called "strong women who are not above being cruel to their loved ones and unreliable men who come and go in the lives of their wives and children". The San Francisco Chronicle called the book "an intense and introspective book, written in limpid and economical prose". In 1997 Shigekuni won a PEN Oakland/Josephine Miles Literary Award.

Eight years after the publication of her first novel, Shigekuni's second novel Invisible Gardens, about a history professor who has an affair with her colleague, was published by Thomas Dunne Books. Critic Michele Ross, writing for The Plain Dealer, noted that Shigekuni "wants to illustrate the unspoken parts of a life" but assessed the book as "symbolism and metaphors run amok". Five years later Unending Nora, Shigekuni's novel about Japanese American internment during World War II told from the perspective of children whose parents had been relocated into camps, was published in 2008. Unending Nora received a 2010 Association for Asian American Studies Book Award Honorable Mention for Prose/Poetry.

Shigekuni's novel In Plain View, a mystery thriller that the Los Angeles Review of Books called "an intriguing psychological dissection of a woman whose lack of a fixed identity sweeps her into dangerous territory", was published in 2016 by The Unnamed Press. Publishers Weekly summarized the book as a "well-written if enigmatic tale".

Shigekuni has taught at Santa Fe Community College, the Institute of American Indian Arts, and Mills College, and is a Professor of Creative Writing at the University of New Mexico. In 2018 Shigekuni, along with fellow female UNM professors, sued the University of New Mexico for violating the federal Equal Pay Act of 1963 by paying female professors less than their male counterparts. The lawsuit also claimed that the university's unequal pay structure violated New Mexico state laws, including the Fair Pay for Women Act and the New Mexico Human Rights Act.

== Recognition ==
- 1997: PEN Oakland/Josephine Miles Literary Award

== Bibliography ==
- Shigekuni, Julie (1995). A Bridge Between Us. Anchor Books. ISBN 978-0-385-47678-2.
- Shigekuni, Julie (2003). Invisible Gardens. Thomas Dunne Books. ISBN 978-0-312-31183-4.
- Shigekuni, Julie (2008). Unending Nora. Red Hen Press. ISBN 978-1-59709-122-0.
- Shigekuni, Julie (2016). In Plain View. The Unnamed Press. ISBN 978-1-939419-98-9.
