= PEN Oakland =

PEN Oakland is a branch of PEN, an international literary and human rights organization. PEN Oakland was founded in 1989 by Ishmael Reed and co-founders Floyd Salas, Claire Ortalda and Reginald Lockett. PEN Oakland annually sponsors the PEN Oakland/Josephine Miles Literary Award, named for the late poet and faculty member of U.C. Berkeley’s English Department. The award honors well-known and emerging Bay Area and international authors for excellence in multicultural literature. Past and present PEN Oakland board members include: Elmaz Abinader, Opal Palmer Adisa, Kim Addonizio, Robert Mailer Anderson, Jesse Beagle, Judith Cody, Lucha Corpi, Nicole Corrales, John Curl, Lucille Lang Day, Sharon Doubiago, Cheryl Fabio, Adelle Foley, Jack Foley, Emil Guillermo, Andrew Phillip Hayes, Herbert R. Kohl, Reginald Lockett, Kirk Lumpkin, Kim McMillon, Gerald Nicosia, Linda Noel, Claire Ortalda, Ishmael Reed, Tennessee Reed, Tony R. Rodriguez, Floyd Salas, Nina Serrano, Ntozake Shange, Gary Soto, Al Young, and Maw Shein Win. PEN Oakland is based in Oakland, California.
