= Floyd Salas =

American fiction writer and boxer (1931–2021)

- Born: January 24, 1931; Walsenburg, Colorado, U.S.
- Died: October 17, 2021 (aged 90); Berkeley, California, U.S.

Floyd Salas (January 24, 1931 – October 17, 2021) was an American novelist, social activist, boxer and boxing coach. His work is well known in the San Francisco Bay Area and among aficionados of both Latino literature and 60s era protest literature.

He was a cofounder of PEN Oakland in 1989, and he won a 2013 lifetime achievement American Book Award from the Before Columbus Foundation. He was married to writer Claire Ortalda, with whom he had a son.

Salas died after a long illness in Berkeley, California, on October 17, 2021, at the age of 90.

== Bibliography ==
- Highrunning Heart. Long Island, NY: Local Gems Press. 2016. ISBN 978-1-5350-1218-8.
- Love Bites. Berkeley: Mad Dog Publishing Company. 2006. ISBN 0-9655974-7-4.
- Steve Nash or the Killer that Got Away. Berkeley: Unpublished Stage Play. 2000.
- State of Emergency. Houston: Arte Publico Press. 1996. ISBN 1-55885-093-7.
- Color of my Living Heart : Poems. Houston: Arte Publico Press. 1996. ISBN 1-55885-171-2.
- Buffalo Nickel. Houston: Arte Publico Press. 1992. ISBN 1-55885-049-X.
- Stories and Poems from Close to Home. Berkeley: Ortalda & Assoc. 1986. ISBN 0-9616101-3-1.
- Lay my Body on the Line. Berkeley: Y’Bird. 1978. ISBN 0-931676-02-9.
- What Now my Love. New York City: Grove Press, republished by Arte Público Press in 1994. 1969. ISBN 1558851127. LCCN 93047654.
- Tattoo the Wicked Cross. New York City: Grove Press. 1967. LCCN 67-20344. OCLC 313706.
- Hail to the poet laureate: For Morton Marcus and Walt Whitman. F. Salas. 1950. ASIN B0006S1NQG.
