= Richard M. Levine =

American academic and writer (born 1942)

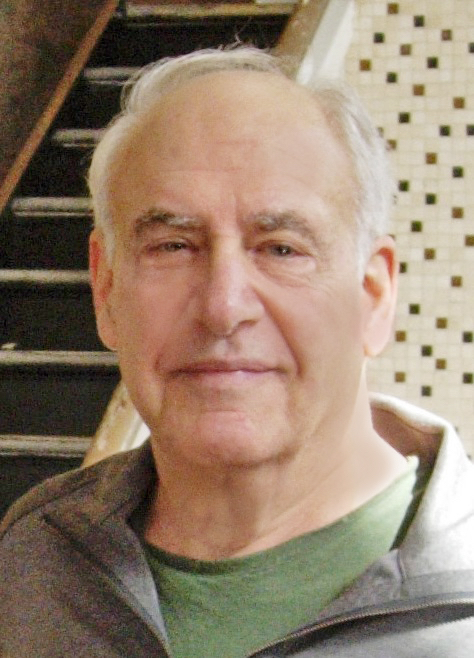
- Born: Richard Michael Levine; June 19, 1942; Brooklyn, New York, U.S.
- Died: May 22, 2026 (aged 83); Castro Valley, California, U.S.
- Education: Wesleyan University, BA, 1963; Columbia University, MA, 1966
- Occupations: Journalist, poet, non-fiction book writer, short story writer, academic
- Spouses: Lucille Lang Day
- Website: richardmichaellevine.com

Richard M. Levine (June 19, 1942 – May 22, 2026) was an American journalist and author. He was best known for Bad Blood: A Family Murder in Marin County, his 1982 book about the murders of Jim and Naomi Olive.

Bad Blood received positive reviews. Greil Marcus, writing in Rolling Stone, argued that "from the beginning of this tale through to its aftermath, the people caught up in its momentum are thrown back on themselves. That is what makes the story Bad Blood has to tell so terrible, and so compelling" Kirkus Reviews wrote that it was a "chilling, fascinating reconstruction" and "a first-class study of a set of American dreams gone wrong." The New York Times, while slightly less enthusiastic, praised "the richness of its detail and the remarkable intimacy with which we get to know its characters."

== Early life and education ==
Born June 19, 1942, in Brooklyn, New York, Levine was the eldest of three children of businessman Bernard Levine and homemaker Gertrude Cohen Levine.

The family moved to Great Neck on Long Island when he was a child, and he graduated from Great Neck North High School in 1959.

He attended Wesleyan University, graduating with a Bachelor of Arts degree in literature in 1963. He continued his education at the Russian Institute of Columbia University, where he received a Master of Arts degree in Slavic languages and literature in 1966. While at Columbia, he received a Fulbright scholarship, which enabled him to study at the University of Warsaw and the University of Krakow (now Jagiellonian University) in Poland.

== Career ==
Levine contributed to Rolling Stone, New York, Painted Bride Quarterly, Esquire, Mother Jones, The Atlantic Monthly, Harper's Magazine, and The New York Times.

His 1969 essay, "Jesse Jackson: Heir to Dr. King?," published in Harper's Magazine, has been reprinted numerous times.

In addition to being a freelance journalist, he served as a contributing editor and columnist at Esquire, as well as a staff writer and editor at Newsweek and the Saturday Review.

Levine also taught at the UC Berkeley Graduate School of Journalism at the University of California, Berkeley.

In 1977, he was awarded an Alicia Patterson Foundation fellowship. His mentors have included American journalist and historian David Halberstam and American writer and editor Willie Morris.

In 2015, Levine published a book of poetry and a book of short stories. He was a 2016 finalist for the Lascaux Prize in Poetry and the Eric Hoffer Book Award in Fiction.

== Personal life ==
Levine was married to educator and writer Lucille Lang Day and lived with her in Oakland, California. He died following a long struggle with frontotemporal dementia.

== Books ==
- Bad Blood: A Family Murder in Marin County (Random House, 1982). ISBN 0394508874
- Catch and Other Poems (Scarlet Tanager Books, 2015). ISBN 978-0976867647
- The Man Who Gave Away His Organs: Tales of Love and Obsession at Midlife (Capra Press, 2015). ISBN 978-1592661046
