= Voices of Our Nation Arts Foundation =

Written arts organization based in the U.S.

Voices of Our Nations Arts Foundation (VONA) is a written arts organization that was founded in 1999 by Pulitzer-prize winning author Junot Diaz, along with award-winning author Elmaz Abinader, Víctor Díaz and Diem Jones in order to provide emerging writers of color with workshops and mentoring by established writers of color. Since its founding, over 2,000 aspiring writers from around the world have been involved in their programs.

== History ==
Voices of Our Nations Arts Foundation came about when Junot Diaz was pursuing his Master of Fine Arts (MFA) at Cornell University in New York City.

After completing his Master of Fine Arts (MFA) Diaz went on to become a published writer and joined with fellow writers of color – Elmaz Abinader, Victor Díaz and Diem Jones – to create the first writing workshop for people of color to be held in San Francisco. The goal of the workshop was to provide an environment where writers of color could share their work in a safe and supportive environment.

After the success of the first workshops VONA formed partnerships with higher learning institution around the San Francisco Bay Area and through a series of workshops, fellowships and residences it brought together established writers of color such as: Elmaz Abinader, Chris Abani and Staceyann Chinn with up and coming writer of colors to give them the opportunity to perfect their craft. The workshops, fellowships, and residences were based on a variety of genres including LGBT identity and travel and sought to reflect the fact that people of color "live in the crossroads of multiple identities"

In 2015 after working out of the Bay Area in California VONA started working with the University of Miami to offer workshops for writers of color. Currently VONA claims to be the only multi-genre workshop in America focused on people of color as students and teachers. Diaz has stated that he considers that the VONA workshops give non-traditional writers the same kind of exposure as a Masters of Fine Arts program in a select university

== Mission ==
According to the foundation's website the Mission of Voices of Our Nations is: To develop emerging writers of color through programs and workshops taught by established writers of color.

== Notable Teachers ==
Some notable instructors of VONA workshops include: Elmaz Abinader, Chris Abani, Staceyann Chinn, Mat Johnson, David Mura, Willie Perdomo, Tayari Jones, Reyna Grande, Kiesse Laymon, Tananarive Due, Valerie C. Woods, Minal Hajratwala, ZZ Packer, Andrew Pham and John Murillo.

== Notable Workshop Alumni ==
- Sonia Guiñansaca
- Zin E. Rocklyn

== Dismantle ==
In 2014 Dismantle: An Anthology of Writing from the VONA/Voices Writing Workshops was published by Thread Makes Blanket press.
