= Maud Lavin =

American writer and cultural historian

Maud K. Lavin (born November 10, 1954) is an American writer of creative nonfiction and poetry. She is a professor emerita of Visual and Critical Studies at the School of the Art Institute of Chicago.

She is a recipient of a Senior Research Residency at Asia Research Institute, National University of Singapore, a Guggenheim fellowship (in 2005), and a National Endowment for the Arts grant. Her most recent book, Boys' Love, Cosplay, and Androgynous Idols: Queer Fan Cultures in Mainland China, Hong Kong, and Taiwan, co-edited with Ling Yang and Jing Jamie Zhao (Hong Kong University Press) was nominated for a Lambda, and an earlier book, Cut with the Kitchen Knife: The Weimar Photomontages of Hannah Höch (Yale UP) was named a New York Times Notable Book. Her other books include Clean New World (MIT Press) and Push Comes to Shove: New Images of Aggressive Women (MIT Press), as well as the anthologies The Oldest We've Ever Been (Arizona) and The Business of Holidays (Monacelli/Random House). Her essays and poems have appeared/are forthcoming in the Nation, Portable Gray, Chicago Artist Writers, Artforum, Harpy Hybrid Review, Rejection Letters, and other venues. Her work has been translated and published in Spanish, Dutch, German, Finnish, Japanese, Korean, and Chinese.

== Publications ==
- Boys' Love, Cosplay, and Androgynous Idols: Queer Fan Cultures in Mainland China, Hong Kong, and Taiwan, co-edited with Ling Yang and Jing Jamie Zhao (Hong Kong UP, 2017)
- Lavin, Maud (2011). Pushie, Jr. Chicago: Grow Books Press. ISBN 9780983666912.
- Push Comes to Shove: New Images of Aggressive Women (MIT, 2010)
- The Oldest We’ve Ever Been (Arizona, 2008), as editor and co-author
- The Business of Holidays (Monacelli/Random House, 2004), as editor and co-author
- Clean New World: Culture, Politics and Graphic Design (MIT, 2001)
- Cut with the Kitchen Knife: The Weimar Photomontgaes of Hannah Hoech (Yale, 1993)
