= Richard Prince (journalist) =

American journalist

- Born: July 26, 1947 (age 78); New York City, New York, U.S.
- Education: Bachelor's degree in journalism
- Alma mater: New York University
- Occupation: Journalist
- Known for: Metro Seven and Journal-isms
- Awards: Robert G. McGruder award winner, 2010; Ida B. Wells Award Winner, 2013

Richard Prince (born 1947) is an American journalist for newspapers, including The Washington Post, and long-term columnist of "Journal-isms," formerly for the Robert C. Maynard Institute for Journalism Education, now on its own site, journal-isms.com. Prince won multiple awards during his career and is known for coverage about diversity in journalism. In 1972, he was a member of the Metro Seven group who protested racial discrimination at The Washington Post.

== Personal ==
Journalist Richard Prince was born on July 26, 1947, to Jonathan and Audrey Prince. Prince was raised in Roosevelt, Long Island, New York, where he graduated from high school in 1964. He graduated from New York University in 1969 with his bachelor's degree in journalism.

== Career ==
Richard Prince's first job as a newspaper reporter was for The Star-Ledger in Newark, New Jersey. After getting his start at the Star-Ledger, Prince went on to The Washington Post where he became part of the Metro Seven, a group of African-American journalists who took issue with the paper's discriminatory practices. At the Rochester Democrat and Chronicle, Prince served in various capacities, such as assistant metro editor, assistant news editor, columnist, and finally as editor of the op-ed page, "Speaking Out." He would later return to the Washington Post as a part-time copy editor.

Richard Prince created the "Journal-isms" column in 1991. While it was supported by the Maynard Institute, where it launched online in 2002. the column broke with the institute in 2016. In 2015, the "Journal-isms" column accounted for 43.25 percent of page views on the Maynard Institute site. The column also began appearing on The Root in 2010. At the time, Prince was searching for a new home and funding stream for his column, which is a mix of commentary and reporting. It is described in publications as the "intersection of news media, race, society and newsroom diversity."

== Notable works of journalism ==
Richard Prince was born in New York City, New York and wrote the ceolum for Journal-isms in Washington D.C.

Prince is known for his work on his column "Journal-isms" which he ran an online version for 13 1/2 years under the Maynard Institute. The Maynard Institute and the column parted ways in 2016. According to a statement on the institute's website: "After much deliberation, the Board of Directors has decided the Journal-isms column is no longer as critical as it has been toward the Institute achieving its goals and aspirations."

On the importance of the column "Journal-isms", David Honig, from Multicultural Media Telecom and Internet Council, said, "Very few stories of this degree of criticality are covered in their entirety, in real time, by a single highly authoritative publication. Journal-isms is a rare exception to the rule that ‘you can never find it all in one place.’ If it's important to minorities in the media, it was in Journal-isms."

Some of Richard Prince's work includes "Yes, it’s a huge deal to have a black journalist run the New York Times," "For op-ed diversity, give editing, mentoring," and "Black journalist, the world needs you."

Richard Prince is known as an expert on race and journalism and in an interview with journalist Charlayne Hunter-Gault for the PBS NewsHour, he described the news media's handling of race:

"Well, I think that there is just too much indifference to the whole idea of diversity. Yes, we will do it if we get to it. I mean, the number of newsrooms in this country that have no people of color at all in them is appalling. And the fact that it’s allowed to remain, I think is scandalous.
"But we’re fighting apathy, indifference and competing interests. And people are saying, look, I have to worry about the bottom line. And they don’t realize that the bottom line is tied to the changing — our changing country that’s becoming browner and browner. And that’s where your potential customers are.
"And so you better learn how to relate to them if you want to stay in business."

== Metro Seven ==
Richard Prince was in the early years of his career when he joined six other journalists to form a group of black journalists who became known as the Metro Seven. The Metro Seven was a group of seven African American men and women who decided to protest the Washington Post's discriminatory practices involving assignments, salary and promotions. It included Michael B. Hodge, Ivan C. Brandon, LaBarbara A. Bowman, Leon Dash, Penny Mickelbury, Ronald A. Taylor, and Richard Prince.

"Despite the obvious wisdom of hiring more people of color, some of the most significant gains for minorities in traditional have come as a result of legal action. In 1972, several black reporters at the Washington Post, dubbed the Metro Seven, filed a landmark Equal Employment Opportunity Commission complaint against the newspaper. It is believed to be the first of its kind in the nation. Those staff members, including Richard Prince and Leon Dash, were also among the pioneering members of the National Association of Black Journalists."

The group was met with this reaction from editor Ben Bradlee, who said at the time it was "an insult to our commitment, vague and totally unacceptable." A round of meetings between the Metro reporters and editors followed, ending in an impasse.

Although the EEOC said the group could pursue the case, members of the "Metro Seven," for financial reasons, did not take it to federal court. However, their actions were credited with triggering a similar complaint by female Post employees, which was later settled in 1980.

The Metro Seven did not go to court, but the group did influence journalism newsrooms to become more diverse. Their EEOC complaint charged the newspaper with "denying black employees an equal opportunity with respect to job assignments, promotional opportunities, including promotions to management positions and other terms and conditions of employment." It also paved the way for women in journalism to speak up and ask for equal opportunity. In 2002, Richard Prince was quoted in an article in honor of the 30-year anniversary. He stated that although there has been advancement when it comes to equality in journalism, there is still work to be done. For instance, as recently as 2015, Richard Prince said in an interview, "I don’t think there is any more criticism of the media than there has ever been. It’s just that we get to hear it now and see it instantaneously."

The group helped advance the diversity of journalism for not only for African American men and women, but women in general and other ethnicities and races.

== Awards ==
In 2012, Prince received the Ida B. Wells Award from the National Association of Black Journalists and the Medill School at Northwestern University. Prince was honored on January 17, 2013, at NABJ's Hall of Fame Induction Ceremony at the Newseum in Washington, D. C.

"NABJ is proud to honor Richard with the Ida B. Wells Award. He is the epitome of someone who speaks truth to power. His columns remind news executives, news managers, reporters, and producers of the importance of being sensitive to issues of diversity and our responsibility to be inclusive in our coverage," said NABJ President Gregory Lee Jr. "Dick is a watchdog whose consistency and watchful eye we all rely upon in his reporting. You can be sure what is read in one of his columns will spark a conversation and more importantly lead to some sort of action."

In 2010, Prince was honored with the Robert McGruder Award from Kent State University for his promotion of diversity in the news business, as well as a P.E.N. Oakland award.
