= Elmaz Abinader =

American poet (born 1954)

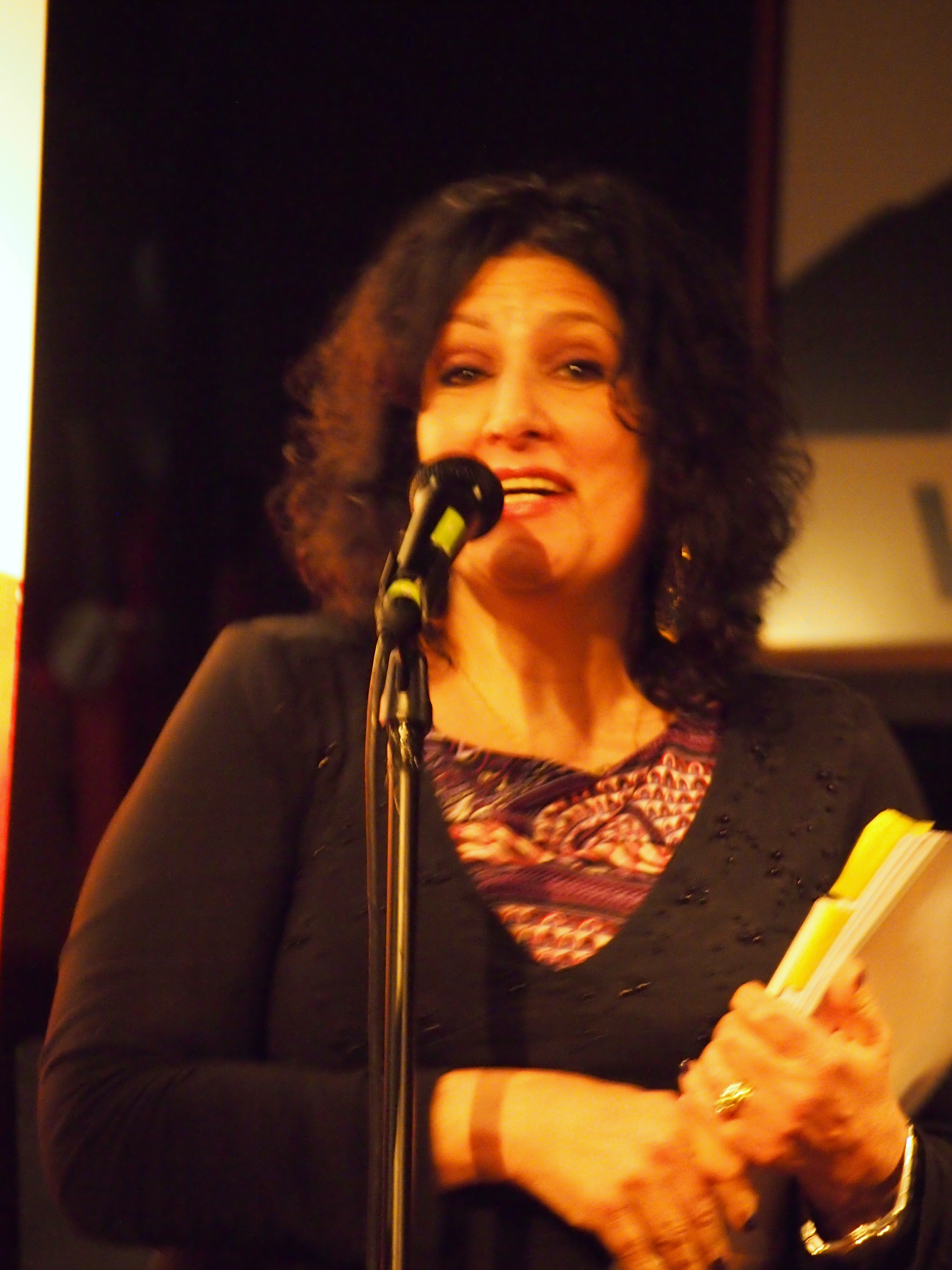
- Born: January 19, 1954 (age 72); Masontown, Pennsylvania, United States
- Education: University of Pittsburgh (B.A.); Columbia University (M.F.A.); University of Nebraska–Lincoln (PhD)
- Occupations: Professor; writer; poet; performer
- Writing career
- Period: 1988–present
- Genres: Poetry; Memoir
- Website: elmazabinader.com

Elmaz Abinader (born 1954 in Pennsylvania) is an American author, poet, performer, English professor at Mills College and co-founder of the Voices of Our Nation Arts Foundation (VONA). She is of Lebanese descent. In 2000, she received the PEN Oakland/Josephine Miles Literary Award for her poetry collection In the Country of My Dreams....

== Life and career ==
Abinader's parents immigrated to the United States from Lebanon. Abinader was born in Masontown, a small coal mining community in southwest Pennsylvania, and grew up in Carmichaels, living with her parents and her five siblings in a household strongly rooted in Lebanese tradition. They were the only Arab family in town. She spent her childhood in helping out her family's store, attending Catholic church twice a day, and focusing on her schooling. Abinader and her siblings faced challenges due to their ethnicity. She graduated from Carmichaels Area High School in 1971.

Abinader received her B.A. in Writing and Communication from University of Pittsburgh in 1974. It was during this time that she embraced her heritage and wrote about her family's history, spurred by the Lebanese Civil War and its affect on American perception of Lebanese people. She earned her MFA in Poetry from Columbia University, School of the Arts Poetry Writing, in 1978. In 1985, she completed her PhD program at the University of Nebraska–Lincoln, with her dissertation, Letters from Home: Stories of Fathers and Sons.

By late 1985, Abinader had taught "fiction, composition, poetry, film and television writing" at Marymount Manhattan College and the University of Nebraska.

In October 1985, Abinader was appointed to the Schweitzer Humanities Fellowship position at Albany State University, which was scheduled to run through 1987. During her fellowship, she wrote Children of the Roojme.

In 1991, Abinader published her memoir, Children of the Roojme: A Family's Journey from Lebanon, which was one of the first Arab American memoirs to be traditionally published. At the time, she had been working as an associate professor of English at John Jay College in the City University of New York, with plans to begin work as an associate professor of fiction and non-fiction at San Jose State University later that year.

In 1997, Abinader and Junot Díaz, Victor Díaz, and Diem Jones, founded VONA/Voices, a San Francisco-based workshop for writers of color. Abinader remained involved with the program for the next two decades, teaching workshops.

In 2002, Abinader was one of 15 authors invited to contribute to a mini-anthology published by the State Department, which was centered on the meaning of being an American.

Abinader currently teaches creative writing at Mills College.

== Work ==
Abinader's first book, Children of the Roojme: A Family's Journey from Lebanon (Norton, 1991) is a memoir covering three generations of her Lebanese family and the challenges of finding a home away from their country. Her second publication, In the Country of My Dreams..., is a collection of poetry focused on dislocation and its various forms. This collection won the PEN Oakland/Josephine Miles Literary Award for Multi-cultural Poetry in 2000 and a Goldies Award for Literature.

Along with her books, she has written and performed in several one-woman plays: Under The Ramadan Moon, Country of Origin, 32 Mohammeds, Voices From the Siege, and The Torture Quartet. Her play Country of Origin was performed at The Kennedy Center in 2009.

== Personal life ==
As of 1991, Abinader was married to Alan Lemke.

== Selected works ==
=== Books ===
- This House, My Bones. Willow Books. 2014.
- In the Country of My Dreams... Sufi Warrior Publishing. 1999. ISBN 9780965376426.
- Children of the Roojme: a Family's Journey from Lebanon. New York: W. W. Norton & Company. 1991. ISBN 9780393029529.
  - Republished 1997 by University of Wisconsin Press

==== In anthologies ====
- Orfalea, Gregory; Elmusa, Sharif, eds. (1988). Grape Leaves: A Century of Arab American Poetry. Salt Lake City: University of Utah Press.
- Akash, Munir; Mattawa, Khaled, eds. (1999). Post-Gibran: Anthology of New Arab American Writing. West Bethesda, Maryland: Kitab (Syracuse University Press, distr.). ISBN 0-9652031-3-1.
- Axelrod, Steven Gould; Roman, Camille; Travisano, Thomas (2012). The New Anthology of American Poetry: Postmodernisms 1950–Present. Rutgers University Press. ISBN 978-0-8135-6290-2.

=== Performances ===
- Imagining Peace, Southbank Centre, London UK, October 2010
- Country of Origin, Arabesques Festival, Kennedy Center, Washington DC, March 2009
- Lies War Discrimination, La Pena Cultural Center, Berkeley CA March 1, 2007
- Cease Fire, La Pena Cultural Center, Berkeley CA, August 2006
- Poetry and Music of Arab-Americans, Amazon Lounge, Fresno CA, April 20, 2006
- Voices from the Siege, debuted 2006, La Pena Cultural Center, Berkeley
- 32 Mohammeds, Martin Segal Theater, New York NY, March 3, 2005
- The Torture Quartet, debuted 2005, University of San Francisco
- Flower Girl, Wyoming Arts Council, Casper College, Casper WY, October 2, 2004
- 32 Mohammeds, debuted, 2004 University of North Dakota
- Ramadan Moon, debuted 2000, Porter Troupe Gallery, San Diego
- Country of Origin, debuted 1997, University of California, Berkeley

== Awards and residencies ==
- 2013 Writers in Residence, Grand Canyon National Park
- 2013 Residency Fellowship, Canserrat Artist Residency, Spain
- 2011 Teaching Fellowship, Palestine Writing Workshop
- 2010 Writer in Residence, El Gouna Writers Residency, Egypt
- 2010 Quigley Summer Fellowship
- 2010 Faculty Development Grant, Mills College
- 2007 Arts Fellowship, Silicon Valley Arts Council, Fiction
- 2006 Residency MacDowell Colony, Peterborough, NH
- 2006 Residency, Villa Montalvo, Saratoga, CA
- 2003 Endowed Chair, Mills College
- 2003 Pushcart Prize Nomination for The Silence
- 2003 Residency, Chateau La Vigny, Switzerland
- 2002 Goldies Award, San Francisco Bay Guardian Recognition in Arts
- 2000 PEN Oakland/Josephine Miles Literary Award, Poetry
- 1999 Drammy, Oregon's Drama Award, for Country of Origin, at IFCC
- 1998–1999 Fulbright Senior Scholarship Egypt
- 1997–1998, 2000–2003 Quigley Fellowship
- 1994–2005 Faculty Development Grant, Mills College
- 1996, 1995, 1994 Quigley Summer Fellowship
- 1995 Best All Around Award, Writers' Harvest, Share Our Strength, Annapolis
