= Stafford Lake =

Stafford Lake may refer to:

- Lake Stafford in Florida
- Stafford Lake County Park in Marin County, California
