= Felucca =

Type of boat

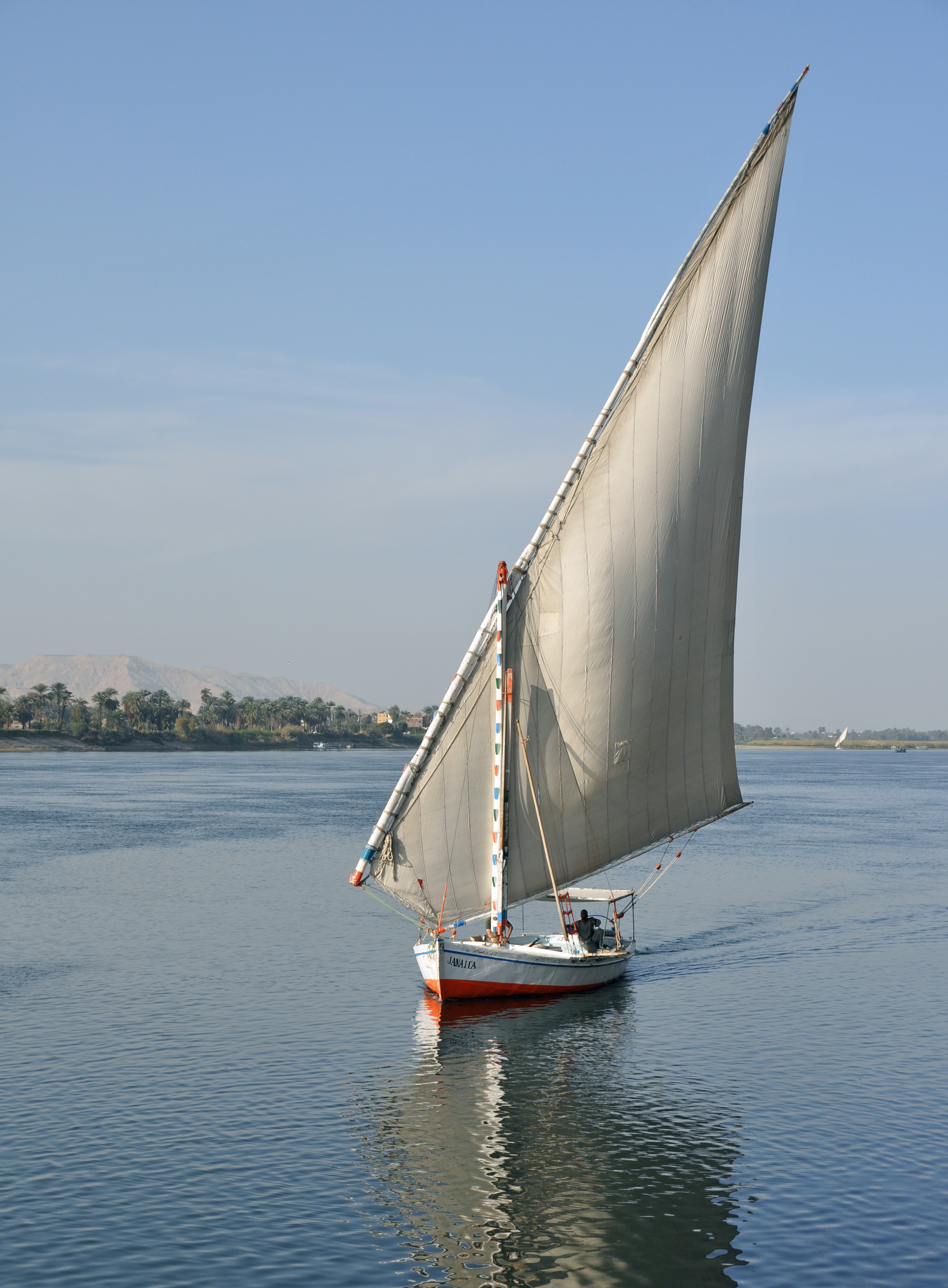
Felucca on the Nile at Luxor

A felucca (Note: Arabic: فلوكة, romanized: felūka, possibly originally from Greek ἐφόλκιον, epholkion) is a traditional wooden sailing boat with a single sail used in the Mediterranean, including around Malta and Tunisia. However, in Egypt, Iraq and Sudan (particularly along the Nile and in the Sudanese protected areas of the Red Sea), its rig can consist of two lateen sails as well as just one.

They are usually able to board ten passengers and the crew consists of two or three people.

Contemporary accounts assert that in the summer of 1610, a felucca was the last boat on which Italian painter Caravaggio travelled from Naples, then under Spanish control, to Palo, Italy whereafter he died in Porto Ercole.

== Egypt ==
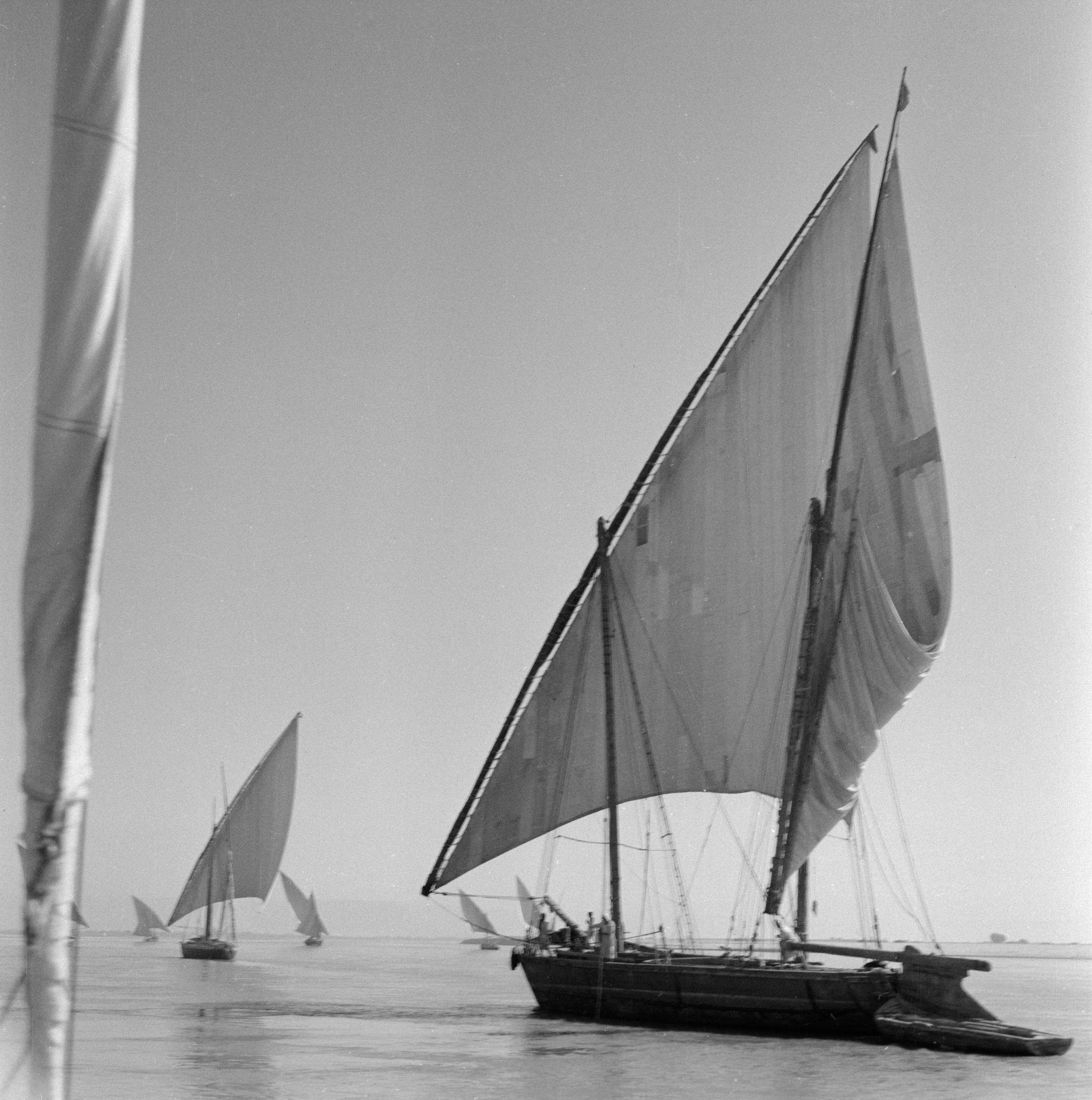
Feluccas on the Nile in 1954–55, picture by Mediterranean sea traveller and writer Göran Schildt.

Despite the availability of motorboats and ferries, feluccas are still in active use as a means of transport in Nile-adjacent cities like Aswan or Luxor. They are especially popular among tourists who can enjoy a quieter and calmer mood than motorboats have to offer.

Feluccas were photographed by writer Göran Schildt's travels on the Nile in 1954–55 as part of his Mediterranean sea travels. Schildt documented them as being called "Ajasor".

== San Francisco ==
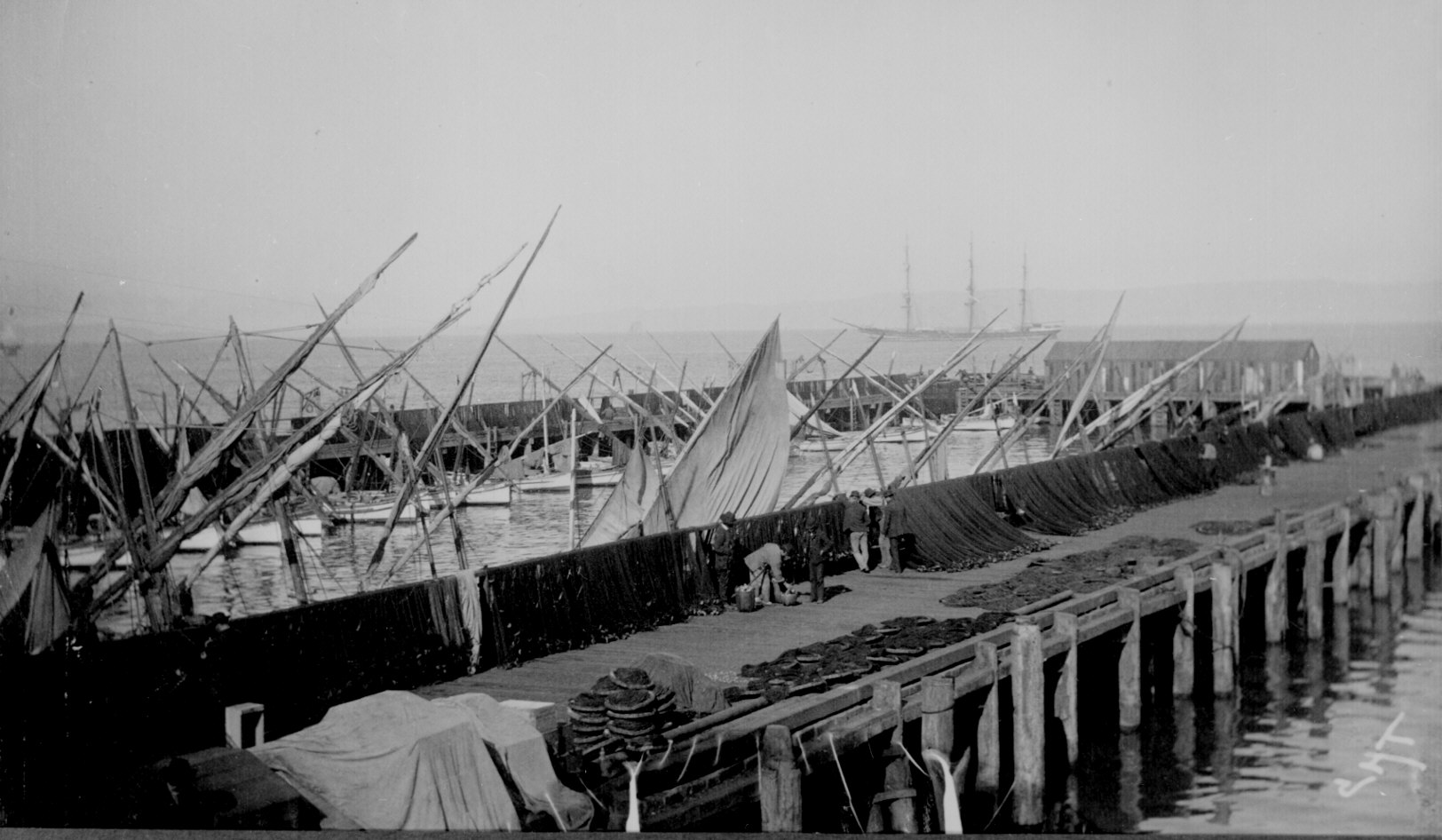
Feluccas at Fisherman's Wharf, San Francisco at the foot of Union Street, circa 1891

A large fleet of lateen-rigged feluccas thronged San Francisco's docks before and after the construction, at the foot of Union Street, of the state-owned Fisherman's Wharf in 1884. Light, small, and maneuverable, the feluccas were the mainstay of the fishing fleet of San Francisco Bay. John C. Muir, Curator of Small Craft, SF Maritime Historical Park, said of them, "These workhorses featured a mast that angled, or raked, forward sharply, and a large triangular sail hanging down from a long, two-piece yard". Among the owners of feluccas in San Francisco Bay was the author Jack London, who recollected his adventure as a young oyster pirate in his works.

Felucca Nuovo Mondo built in 1987, sails from San Francisco Maritime National Historical Park.

== See also ==
- Dhow
