= The Brothers (San Francisco Bay) =

Pair of small islands, East Brother and West Brother, in San Francisco Bay

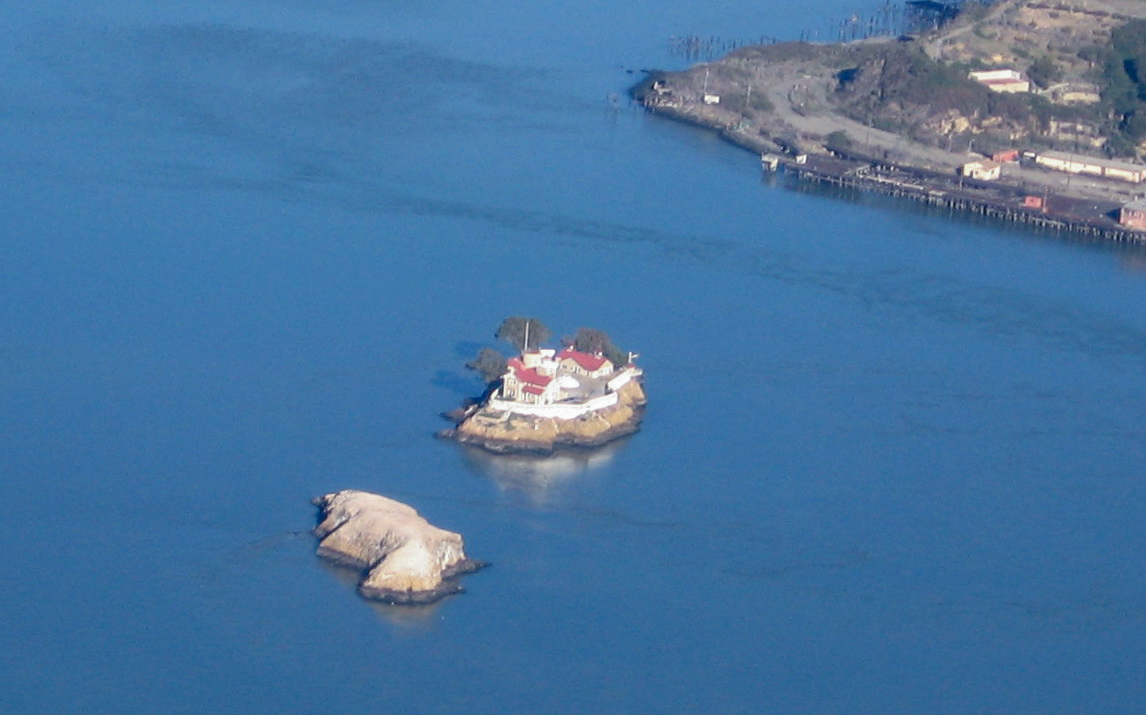
- Aerial photo of The Brothers

- Location within San Francisco Bay Area Location within California Location within the United States

Geography
- Coordinates: 37°57′48″N 122°25′59″W

Administration
- United States
- State: California
- County: Contra Costa County, California

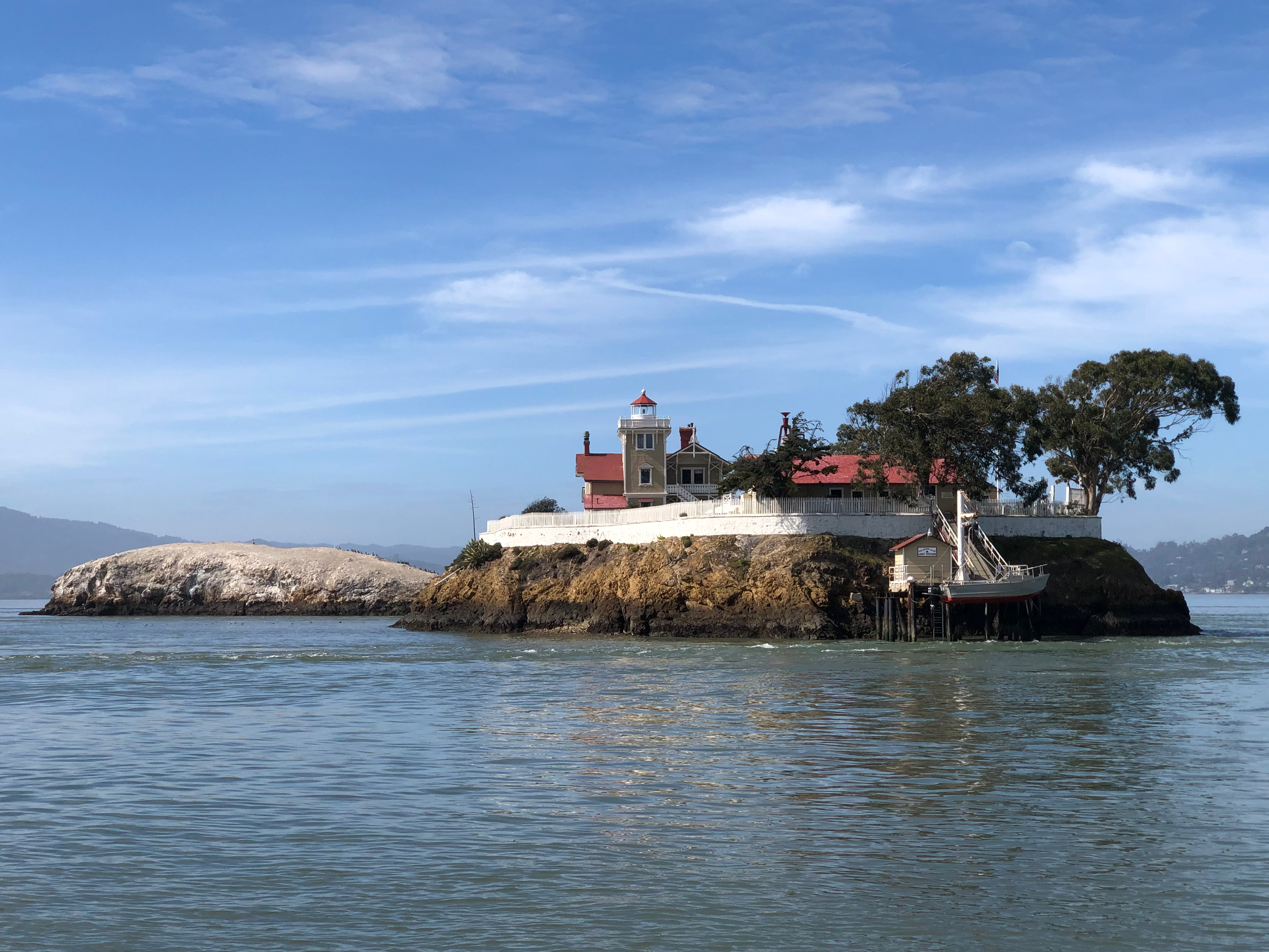
West Brother Island and East Brother Light Station

The Brothers are a pair of small islands, East Brother and West Brother, located in the San Rafael Bay embayment of San Pablo Bay, roughly 1,000 feet (300 m) west of Point San Pablo in Contra Costa County, California.

== History ==
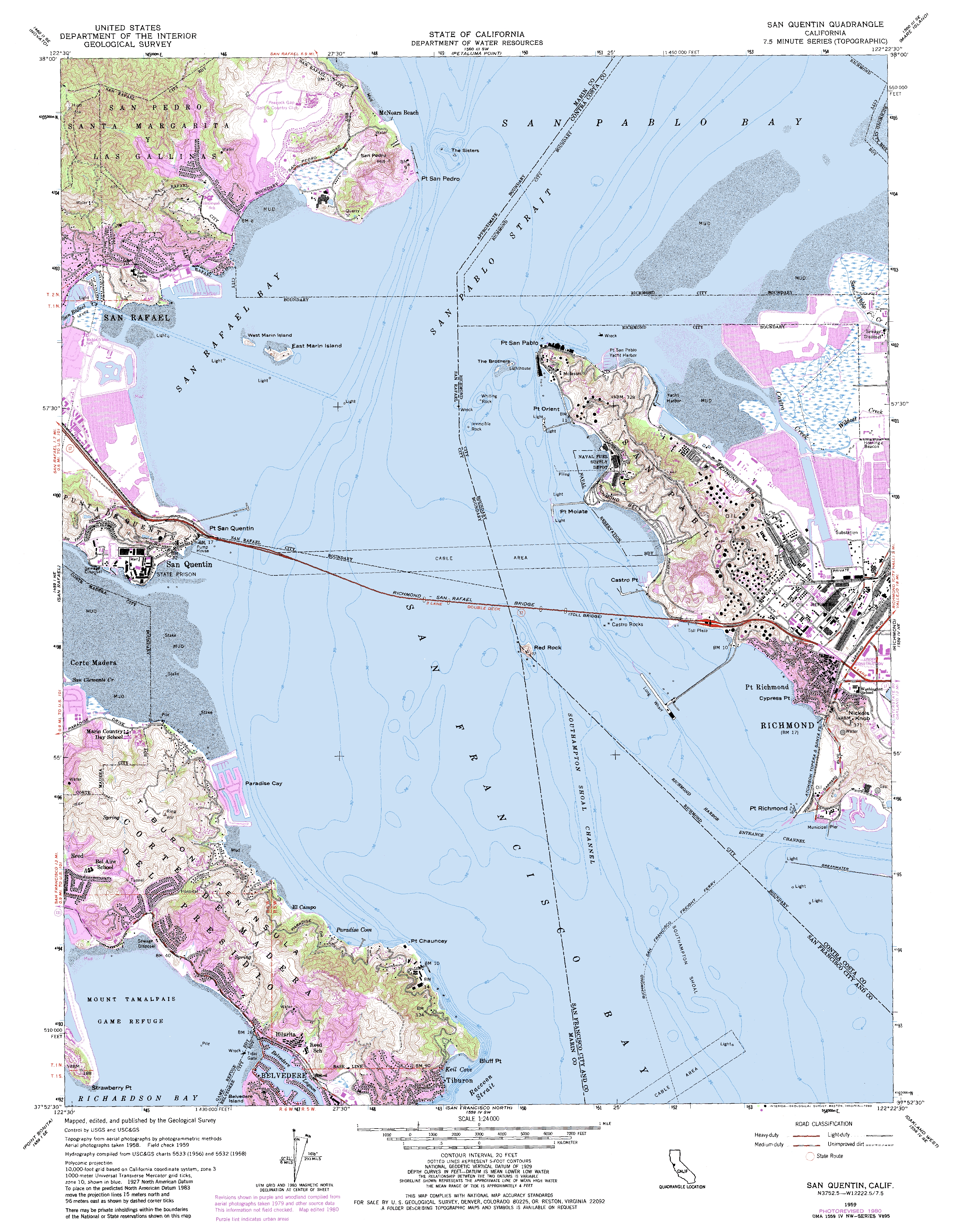
USGS Topographic Map of San Rafael Bay area.

The 19th century Mexican Diseño del Rancho de San Pablo, (diseño: a plat map typically used to indicate rancho land grant boundaries in Alta California), names East Brother Island as Isla de Pajaros or "Bird Island." They are shown, labeled "The Brothers", on an 1850 survey map of the San Francisco Bay area made by Cadwalader Ringgold.

The Brothers, along with The Sisters (two exposed rocks two miles (3.2 kilometres) north of the Marin Islands, just off Point San Pedro) on the opposite side of San Pablo Strait, were originally reserved for military purposes by order of President Andrew Johnson in 1867. After many a court battle, the plans were scrapped.

East Brother Island is home to the East Brother Island Light, a light house and a Victorian house, that is a present-day bed and breakfast.

== See also ==
- Islands of San Francisco Bay
- List of islands of California
