= McNear =

McNear may refer to:

- McNear, California, former name of McNears Beach, California
- Howard McNear
