= The Sisters (California) =

Name of two islands in San Pablo Bay, California

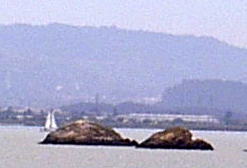

- Location within San Francisco Bay Area Location within California Location within the United States

Geography
- Location: Northern California
- Coordinates: 37°59′18″N 122°26′28″W
- Adjacent to: San Pablo Bay

Administration
- United States
- State: California
- County: Marin

The Sisters are two small rock islands in San Pablo Bay, located 500 meters (1,600 ft) northeast of Point San Pedro in Marin County, California.

The Sisters were shown in an 1850 survey map of the San Francisco Bay area made by Cadwalader Ringgold. They, along with The Brothers on the opposite side of the San Pablo Strait, were reserved for military purposes by order of President Andrew Johnson in 1867. After many a court battle the plans were scrapped.

== See also ==
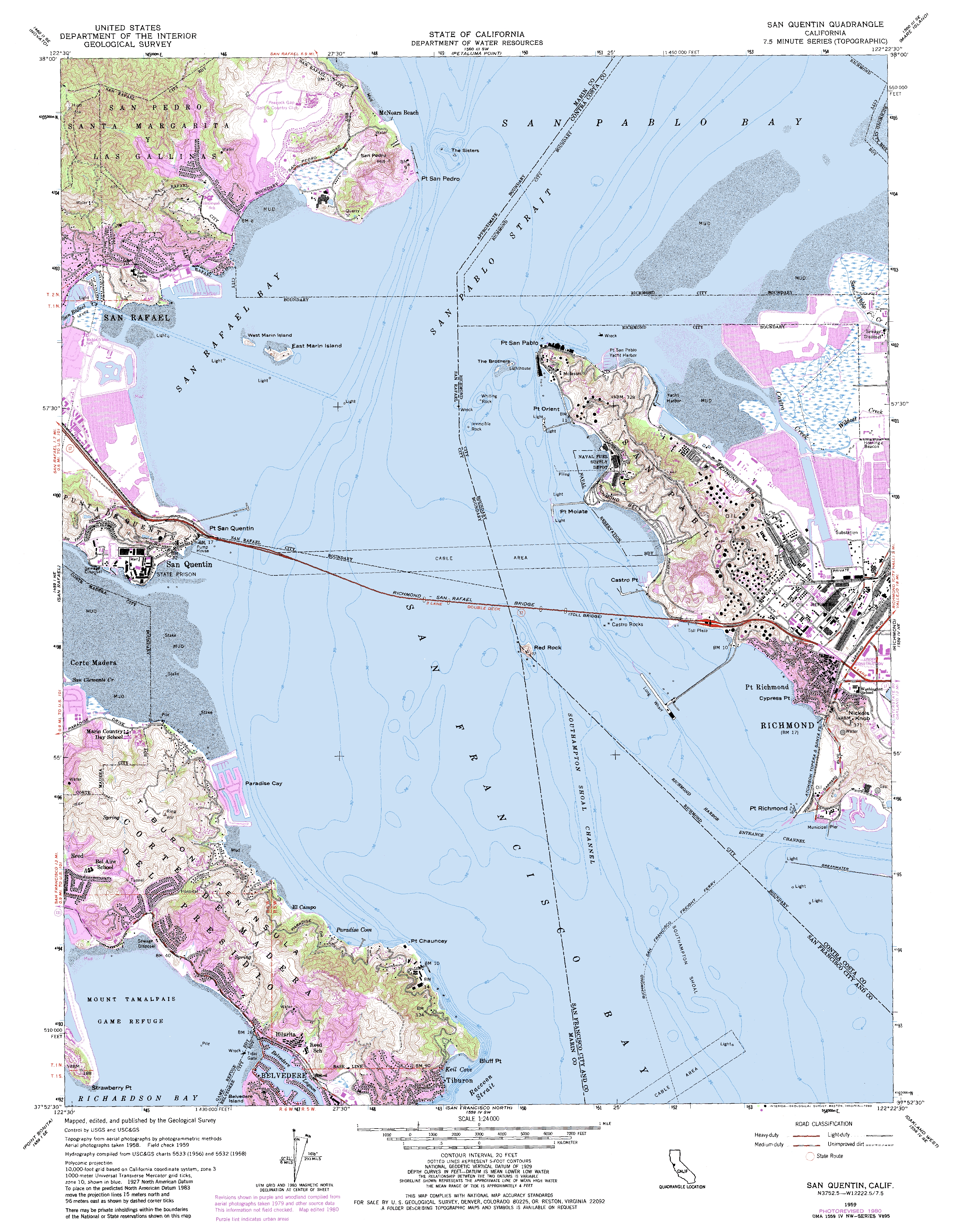
USGS Topographic Map of San Rafael Bay + San Pablo Bay.

- Islands of San Francisco Bay
- San Pablo Bay topics
