= San Rafael Rock Quarry =

Quarry in San Rafael

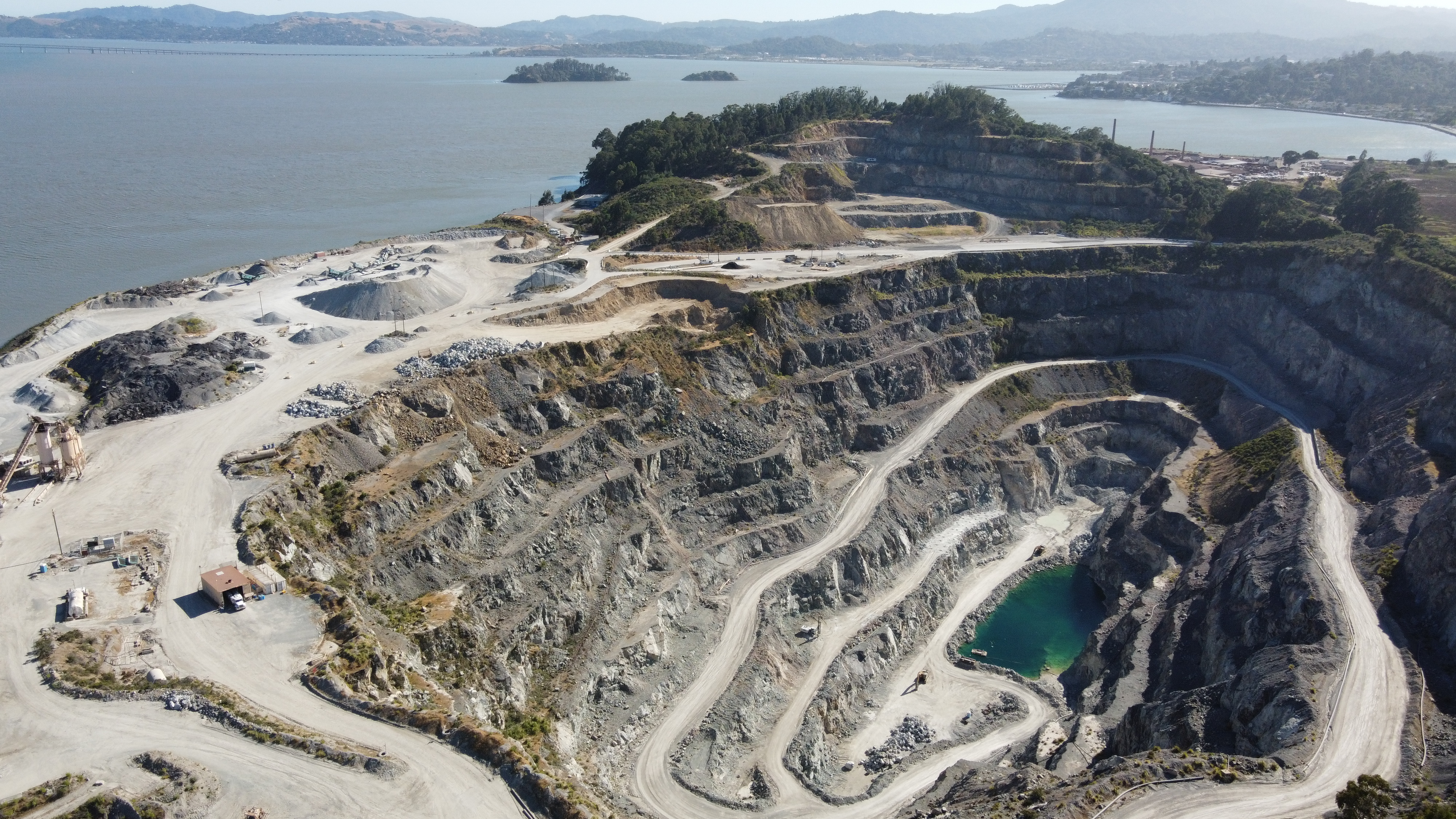
- The San Rafael Rock Quarry, viewed from above

- Location in California
- Location: San Rafael, California, United States; 37.9868°N 122.4531°W
- Products: Granite, basalt, limestone, gandstone, gravel
- Greatest depth: 250 feet (76 m) below sea level
- Opened: 1929
- Company: Dutra Group
- Website: https://www.sanrafaelrockquarry.com/

The San Rafael Rock Quarry, also commonly known as the McNear Quarry, is a 172 acres (70 ha) granite quarry located east of San Rafael, California, United States. Stone from the quarry has been used in many places, such as for levee maintenance in Novato and the Sacramento-San Joaquin Delta, and road improvement in Larkspur and San Francisco.

== History ==
Although the McNear Brickyard had been there since 1870, the land upon which the quarry now stands stayed a dairy farm for longer. Hard rock quarrying began in 1929.

Trouble began in 1972, when conflicting reports and general confusion about quarry operations threatened the quarry, which indicated it would shut down in 1993 as a result. The county subsequently rezoned the land, but the quarry stayed, operating as a nonconforming use which it still does today. It was previously called the Bull Quarry.

In 2025, the mineral rights to the quarry were purchased by Dublin, Ireland-based CHR, plc.

== Location ==
The Quarry is located on the eastern end of the San Pedro Peninsula, directly south of McNear's Beach. The quarry's waterfront location makes it simple to load rock directly onto barges for transport. Rock is also exported by trucks.

== Operation ==
As of June 1914, the quarry produced an average of 2500 tons per day. Much of the rock is a hard, bluish, Franciscan metamorphic sandstone, alongside shale. The main quarry bowl is approximately 1,800 feet (550 m) wide from west to east, 800 feet (240 m) wide from south to north, and has a maximum depth of 250 feet (76 m) below sea level. A seasonal pond can form at the bottom of the pit during the rainy season.

== Reclamation ==
The quarry has been reclaiming used mine land, specifically into wetlands. They are currently in the process of reclaiming a 7-acre tract of previously mined land. They have also been working to preserve the existing wetland west of the quarry.
