= West Brother Island =

West Brother Island may refer to:

- The Brothers (islands), Hong Kong
- The Brothers (San Francisco Bay), California, USA
- West Brother Island (Alaska), an island of Alaska
