= Chief Marin =

Amerindian tribal leader

Chief Marin (aka Huicmuse and Marino)
- Born: c. 1781 present-day Marin County, California, U.S.
- Died: March 15, 1839; Mission San Rafael Arcángel, California, U.S.
- Occupation: Chief of Licatiut
- Spouse(s): (1) Marina Mottiqui, (2) Dona, (3) Juana

Chief Marin (c. 1781 – March 15, 1839) was the "great chief of the tribe Licatiut" (a branch of Coast Miwok native to present-day Marin County, California), according to General Vallejo's semi-historical report to the first California State Legislature in 1850. Historical records indicate that he was baptized as a young man at Mission San Francisco de Asís (of San Francisco, California) in 1801 and eventually moved to Mission San Rafael Arcángel (of San Rafael), where he was an alcalde in the 1820s. Marin died on March 15, 1839, of natural causes. Marin County and the Marin Islands are believed to be named in his honor.

== Biography ==
Marin first appears in the historical record on March 7, 1801, when he was baptized as Marino at Mission San Francisco de Asís, and also married on the same day to Marina Mottiqui. The recorder wrote in the baptismal register that he was about twenty years old ("como de 20"), that his native name was Huicmuse and that he came from the Huimen local tribe. The identities of his parents were not provided, typical of Franciscan baptismal entries for adult Indians.

The young man's new wife Marina died the next year on July 17, 1802. He subsequently remarried to a woman named Dona (or Doda) on Sept 26, 1802, at the same mission. She died August 10, 1817. His third and final recorded marriage was to Juana, in the same mission, and records show she was baptized on August 28, 1816.

In subsequent mission records, the Chief appeared as a godparent, a parent (once, a son died at birth), and a widower in the death records of his wives. His name was spelled variously Marin or Marino.

General Vallejo gave Marin very early credence in 1850 as the "great chief of the tribe Licatiut", and the one the County of Marin is named after. Vallejo headed the committee that named the counties. He commented in a semi-historical report on the origins of County names to the first California State Legislature in 1850:

"Marin. This is the name of the great chief of the tribe Licatiut....In the year 1815 or 1816 a military expedition proceeded to explore the country north of the bay of San Francisco, and on returning by the Petaluma Valley an engagement ensued with Marin, in which he was made prisoner and conducted to the station at San Francisco, from which he escaped, and again reaching Petaluma, he united his scattered forces, and thence- forward dedicated his most strenuous efforts to harass the troops in their hostile incursions into that part of the country....but was again taken captive to San Francisco in 1824; whence being set at liberty, he retired to the mission of San Rafael, and there died in 1834." -- General Vallejo, 1850

This report is considered semi-historical. It puts the chief as a (prisoner) resident of the San Francisco mission about 1816/17. Mission records show in those years, his second wife Dona died there, and he married his third wife, Juana.

His death is recorded at the San Rafael Mission.

== Legends ==
Several late nineteenth-century historians, such as Alexander Taylor and Hubert Howe Bancroft, repeated unsubstantiated stories to the effect that Marin and some other chiefs were light-skinned, intelligent, and leaders because they were descendants of a Spaniard from a shipwrecked galleon. Goerke, who has recently brought together the factual and mythic details of Marin's life, states, "Assumptions that such a lineage made them qualified to be leaders were examples of nineteenth-century racism and ethnocentrism."
