= McNears Beach, California =

McNears Beach
- Private recreational facility
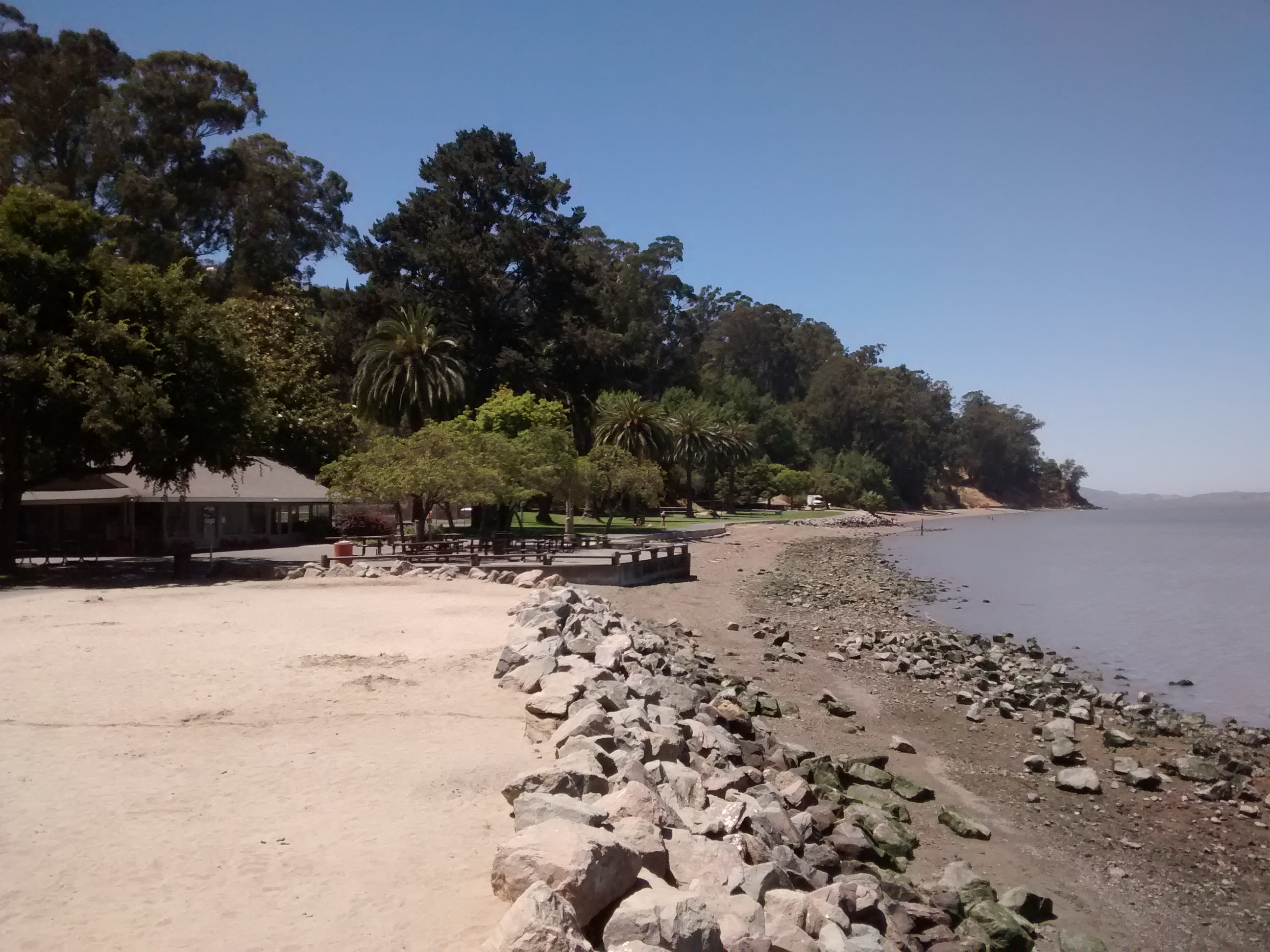

- Location in California McNears Beach (the United States)
- Coordinates: 37°59′36″N 122°27′12″W
- Country: United States
- State: California
- County: Marin County
- Elevation: 9.8 ft (3 m)

McNears Beach was the site of a fashionable beach resort established in the 1880s on San Pablo Bay in Marin County, California. It was located 0.5 miles (0.8 km) north-northwest of Point San Pedro, and 3.4 miles (5.4 km) northeast of San Rafael. The United States Board of Geographic Names rejected other, similar names proposed for the site, including McNear, McNear Landing, and McNear's Beach.

== History ==
In 1859 John A. McNear purchased 700 acres at Point San Pedro from the estate of Timothy Murphy, the original owner of Rancho San Pedro, Santa Margarita y Las Gallinas, a 21,000 acre Mexican land grant. McNear established a dairy farm and gradually increased his holdings in the area to 2,440 acres and more than five miles of waterfront on San Pablo Bay. Chinese immigrants worked at the McNear ranch and supplemented their income by fishing for shrimp along the shores of San Pablo Bay. In the 1880s, McNear and his son established a fashionable resort on the shore that included a hotel, gardens, and a dance hall. In 1898, he built the McNear Brick Company. His plans for adding a shipping terminal and railroad at the site were thwarted by the 1906 San Francisco earthquake.

The McNear post office was established on the site in 1897 and discontinued in 1910.

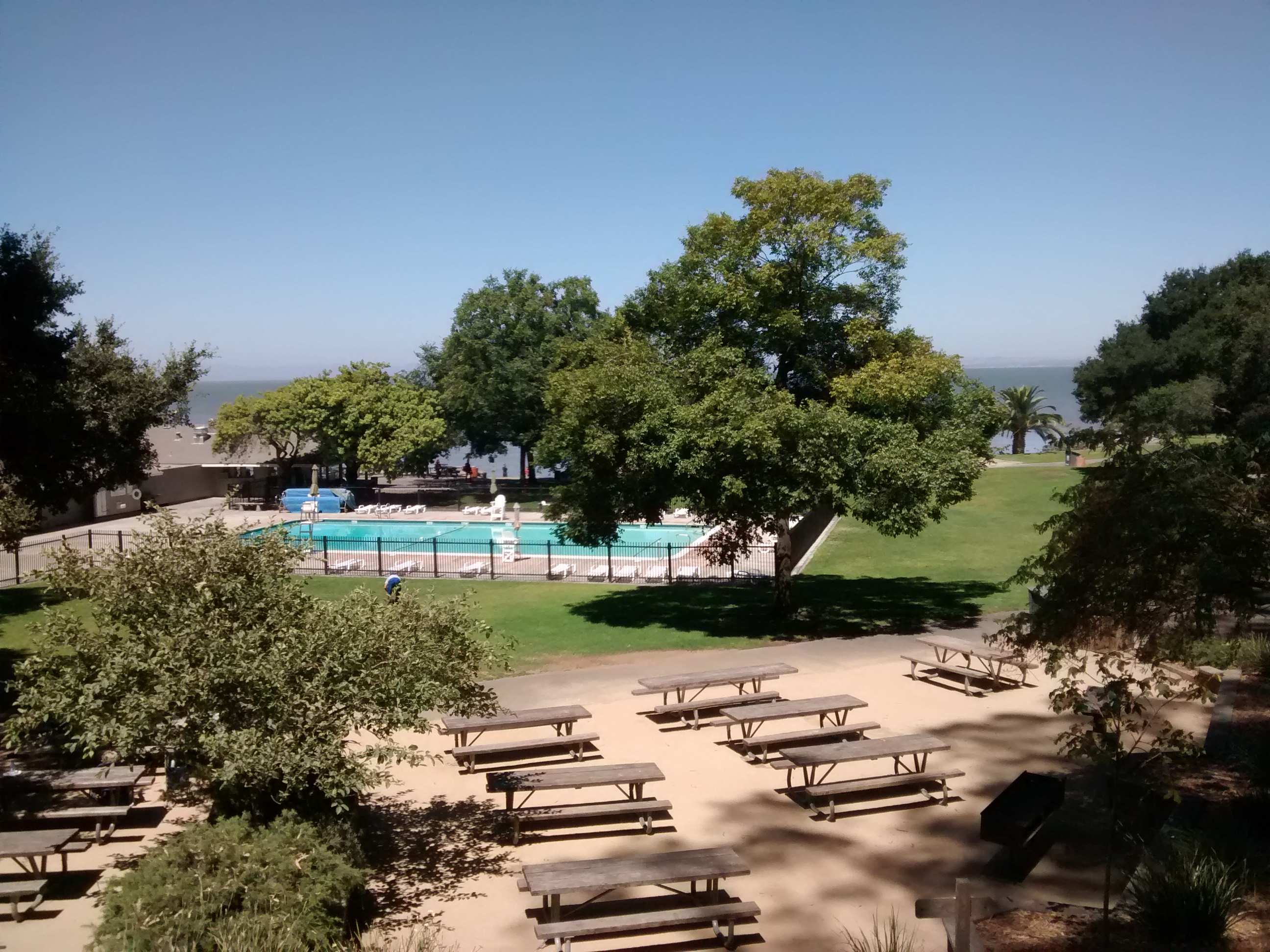
The swimming pool and a picnic area at McNears Beach Park

== McNears Beach Park ==
In 1970, the County acquired 55 acres at McNears Beach to create McNears Beach Park. Today, McNears Beach Park is a regional park offering a fishing pier, swimming pool, snack bar, sand volleyball court, picnic areas, and tennis courts.

The McNear stables remain, and is now used as a Park Ranger Office operated by Marin County Department of Parks and Open Space.

China Camp State Park, adjacent to McNear Beach on the east, is a unit of the San Francisco Bay National Estuarine Research Reserve.

== See also ==
- Parks in Marin County, California
- San Rafael Bay
- List of beaches in California
- List of California state parks
