= San Rafael Creek =

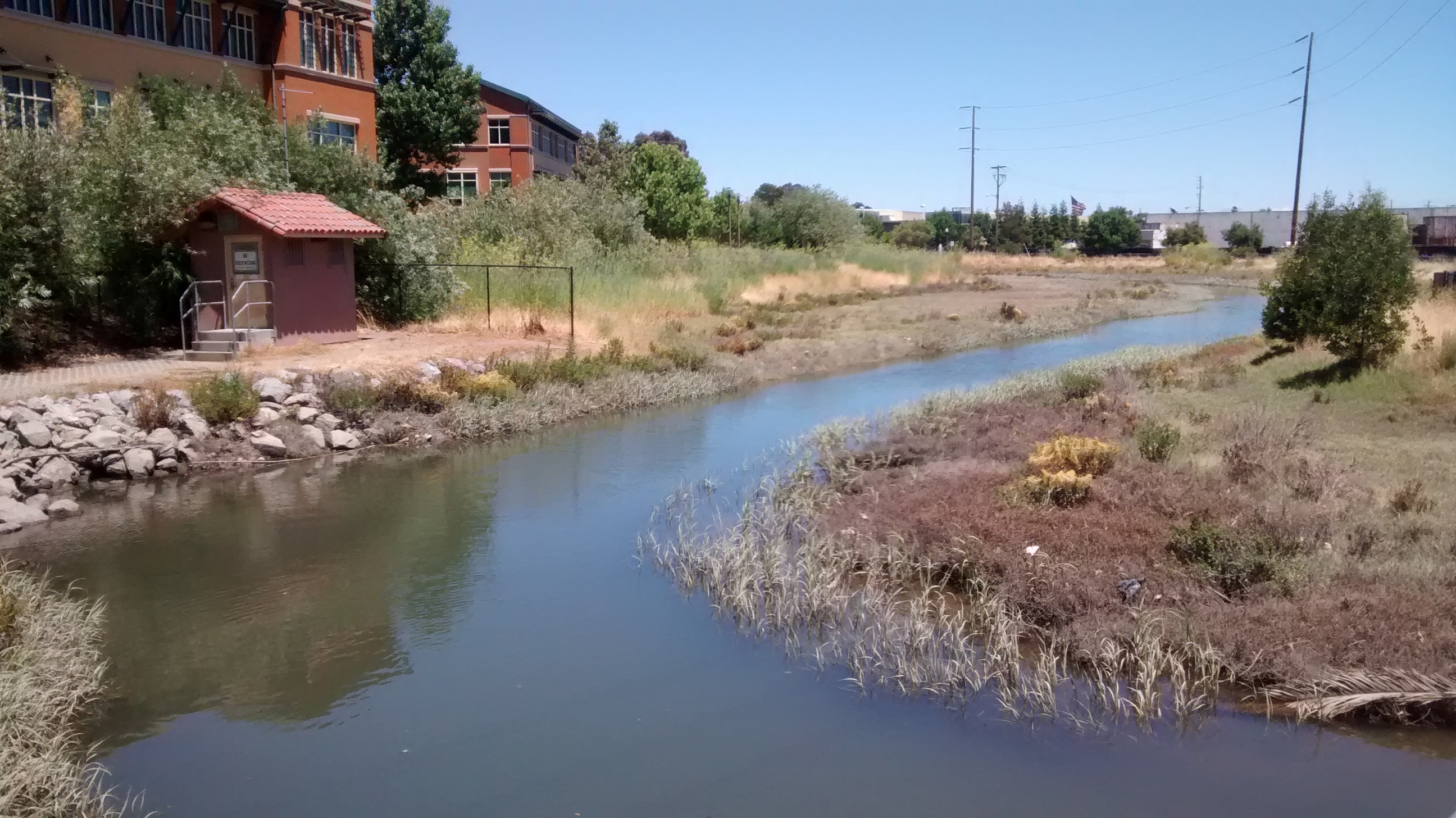

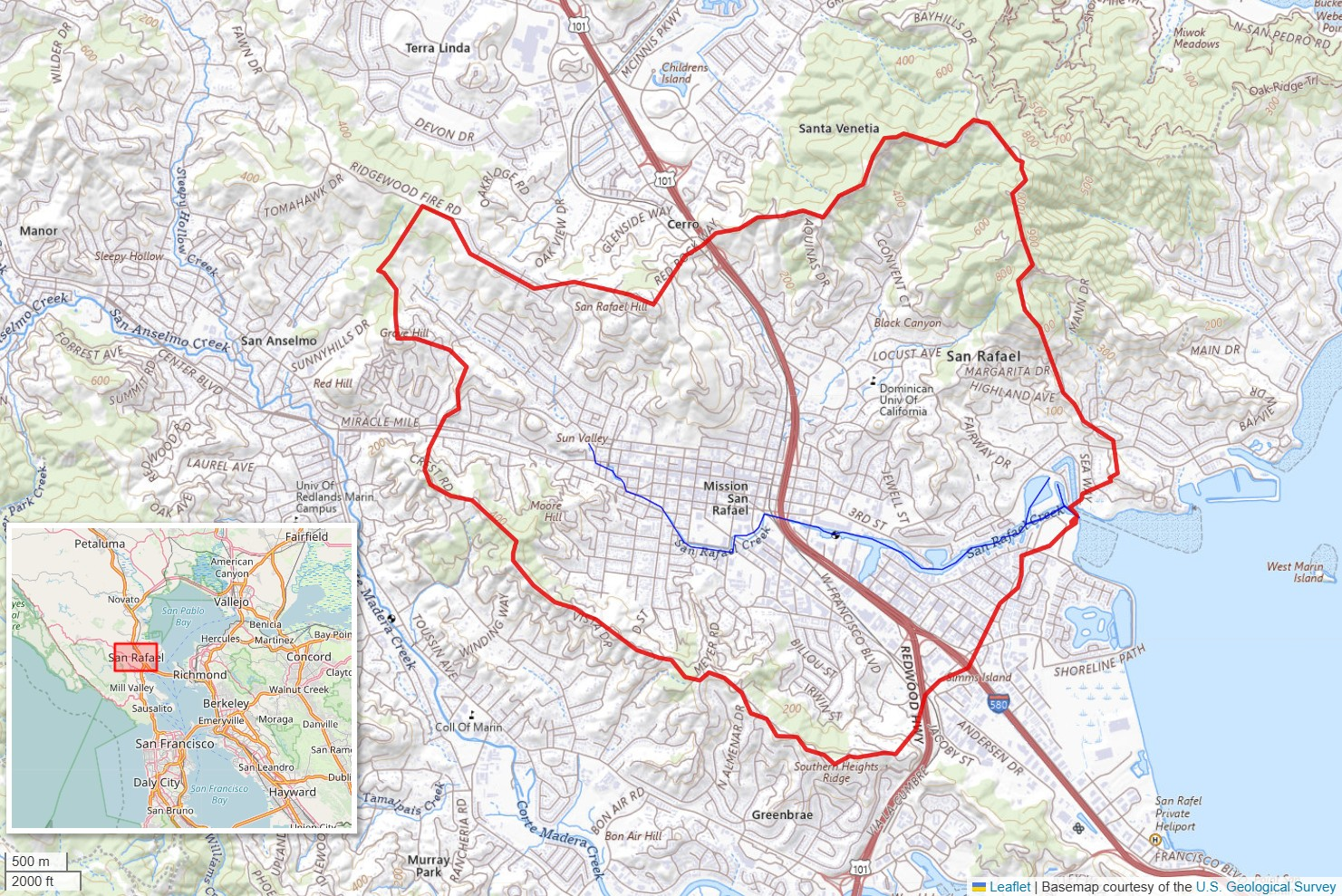
- San Rafael Creek watershed (Interactive Map)
- Etymology: Spanish

Location
- Country: United States
- State: California
- Region: Marin County

Physical characteristics
- Source
  - location: San Rafael, California
  - coordinates: 37°58′30″N 122°32′18″W
- Mouth: San Rafael Bay
  - location: 1.5 mi (2 km) north of San Quentin State Prison
  - coordinates: 37°58′2″N 122°29′11″W
  - elevation: 0 ft (0 m)
- Length: 3 mi (4.8 km)

San Rafael Creek is a watercourse in Marin County, California, United States that discharges to San Rafael Bay, a small embayment of the San Francisco Bay. The mouth of San Rafael Creek is a channelized estuary through an industrial area. San Rafael Creek has a designation under Federal Law Section 303(d) as impaired by diazinon, the principal pollutant causing impairment designations for streams discharging to San Pablo Bay, which is the northern arm of San Francisco Bay. In September 2007, the organization Save The Bay designated San Rafael Creek as one of the top ten "worst trash hot spot" waterways flowing into the San Francisco Bay. The channel portion of San Rafael Creek below the Grand Street Bridge is dredged on a regular maintenance schedule to keep the shallow draft channel navigable. Dredge spoils are disposed of at a site near Alcatraz Island.

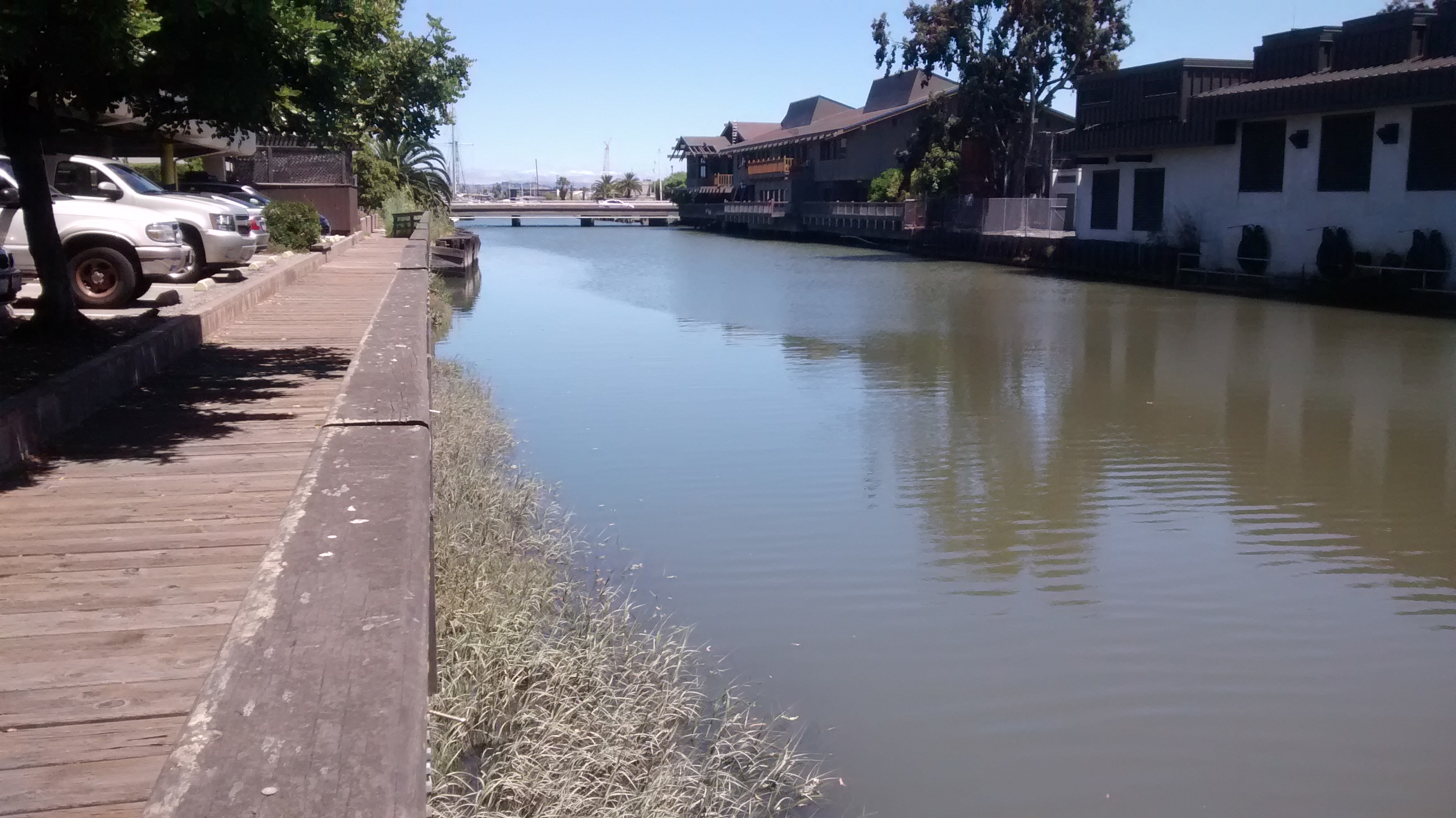
San Rafael Creek in June 2014

Most of the soils in the lower watershed are clays and bay mud, resulting in a low transmissivity of groundwater. Typical vertical soil profiles in the lower watershed are four to five feet of imported fill over 60 to 65 feet (18–20 meters) of bay mud set on a basement of Franciscan Sandstone bedrock. At the mouth of San Rafael Creek, situated on the south bank, is Pickleweed Park, where shorebirds can be seen, particularly in the winter migration season.

== See also ==
- List of watercourses in the San Francisco Bay Area
- Salt Marsh Harvest Mouse
