= Marin County Department of Parks and Open Space =

The Marin County Department of Parks and Open Space, consisting of the Marin County Parks and Landscape Division and the Marin County Open Space District, is a parks governing body in Marin County, California overseen by the Marin County Board of Supervisors. The current director and general manager is Max Korten.

== Parks ==
- McInnis Park, in San Rafael
- McNears Beach Park, on San Pablo Bay
- Paradise Beach Park, on the Tiburon peninsula
- Stafford Lake Park
- Agate Beach, near Bolinas, and part of the Duxbury Reef State Marine Conservation Area
- Upton Beach, at Stinson Beach

== Marin County Open Space District Preserves ==
- Alto Bowl
- Bald Hill
- Baltimore Canyon
- Blithedale Summit
- Bolinas Lagoon
- Bothin Marsh
- Camino Alto
- Cascade Canyon
- Deer Island
- French Ranch
- Gary Giacomini
- Horse Hill
- Ignacio Valley
- Indian Tree
- Indian Valley
- King Mountain
- Little Mountain
- Loma Alta
- Loma Verde
- Lucas Valley
- Maurice Thorner Memorial
- Mount Burdell
- Old Saint Hilary's
- Pacheco Valle
- Ring Mountain
- Roy's Redwoods
- Rush Creek
- San Pedro Mountain
- Santa Margarita Island
- Santa Venetia Marsh
- Terra Linda / Sleepy Hollow
- Tiburon Ridge
- Verissimo Hills
- White Hill
