= Marin Islands =

Uninhabited islands in California

Marin Islands National Wildlife Refuge
- IUCN category IV (habitat/species management area)
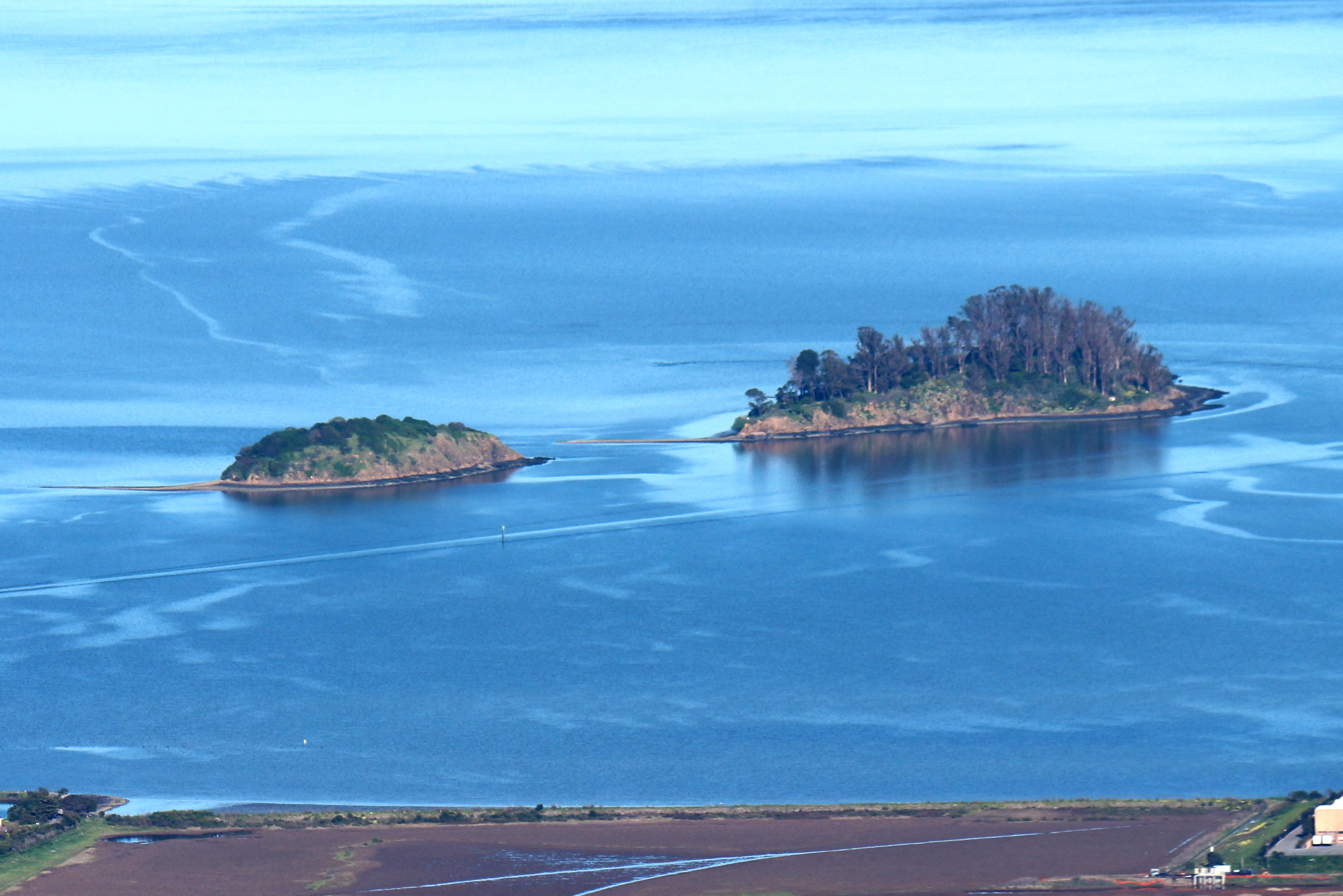
- View of the Marin Islands from Mount Tamalpais

- Location within San Francisco Bay Area Location within California Location within the United States
- Location: San Pablo Bay, Marin County, California, U.S.
- Nearest city: San Rafael, California
- Coordinates: 37°57′55″N 122°28′16″W
- Established: 1992
- Governing body: U.S. Fish and Wildlife Service
- Website: Marin Islands National Wildlife Refuge

The Marin Islands are two small islands, named East Marin and West Marin, in San Rafael Bay, an embayment of San Pablo Bay in Marin County, California.

== Geography ==
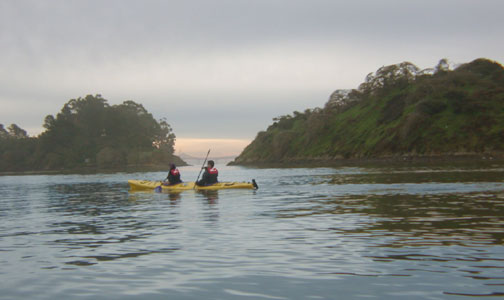
Kayakers near the Marin Islands

The Marin Islands are located offshore from the city of San Rafael, in the northern San Francisco Bay Area. The islands comprise the Marin Islands National Wildlife Refuge, which was established in 1992. The surrounding submerged tidelands are also included in the refuge. The islands are the property of the U.S. Fish and Wildlife Service and require special permission to visit.

== History ==
The islands are named after the Coast Miwok man known as Chief Marin, after whom Marin County was later named. He is thought to have hidden out there in the 1820s after escaping from Mission San Rafael, before being recaptured and incarcerated at the Mexican San Francisco Presidio.

The islands were donated to the federal government by the Crowley family of San Francisco. They had been bought by Thomas Crowley at auction in 1926 for $25,000 in the hope that they would become the western terminus of the Richmond–San Rafael Bridge. Instead, they became a family vacation spot for more than sixty years.

== Ecology ==
West Marin Island, elevation 26 meters (85 ft) above the bay waters, supports the largest heron and egret rookery in the San Francisco Bay Area. Nesting species include great egrets, snowy egrets, great blue herons, and black-crowned night herons.

East Marin Island, a former vacation retreat, now supports a variety of introduced and native plants and provides critical nesting material and rest sites for the nearby colony.

The submerged tidelands support a variety of resident and migratory water birds such as surf scoter, black oystercatcher, diving ducks, and osprey. Refuge objectives are to protect migratory species, including the heron and egret nesting colony, protect and restore suitable habitat for the colony, and protect the tidal mud flats and unique island ecosystem.

== See also ==
- Islands of San Francisco Bay
- San Pablo Bay topics
