= Grace Quan =

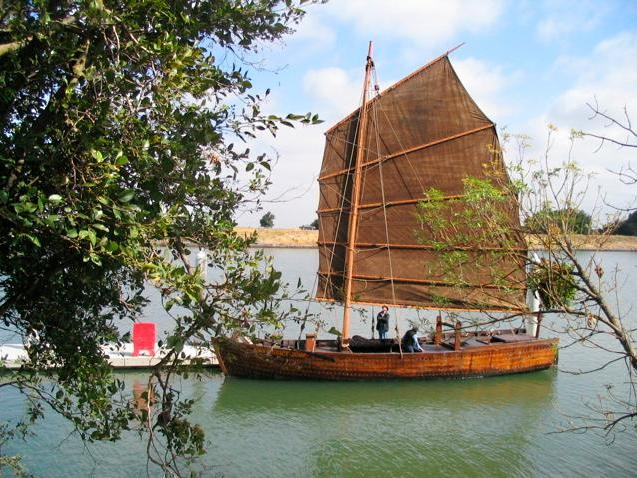
- Grace Quan prepared to sail

History

United States
- Owner: San Francisco Maritime National Historical Park and China Camp State Park
- Builder: Park employees and volunteer labor
- Laid down: April 24, 2003
- Launched: October 25, 2003
- Status: Museum ship

General characteristics
- Class & type: Chinese-American shrimp fishing junk
- Length: 42 ft 3 in (12.88 m)
- Beam: 10 ft 4 in (3.15 m)
- Draft: One foot with rudder and daggerboard up, five feet with rudder and daggerboard down
- Propulsion: Sail or oars
- Sail plan: Single masted catboat, traditional cotton sail with six battens

Grace Quan is a modern reconstruction of a Chinese-American shrimp fishing junk, similar to those in the fleet that operated in San Francisco Bay in the late 19th and early 20th centuries. The junk was built in 2003 as a joint project between China Camp State Park in San Rafael, California and the San Francisco Maritime National Historical Park, and is now jointly exhibited and operated by both institutions. It functions as a "working sailing museum" to educate the public about a previously forgotten chapter in the history of Chinese-American immigrants to California.

== History of the San Francisco Bay shrimp fishery ==
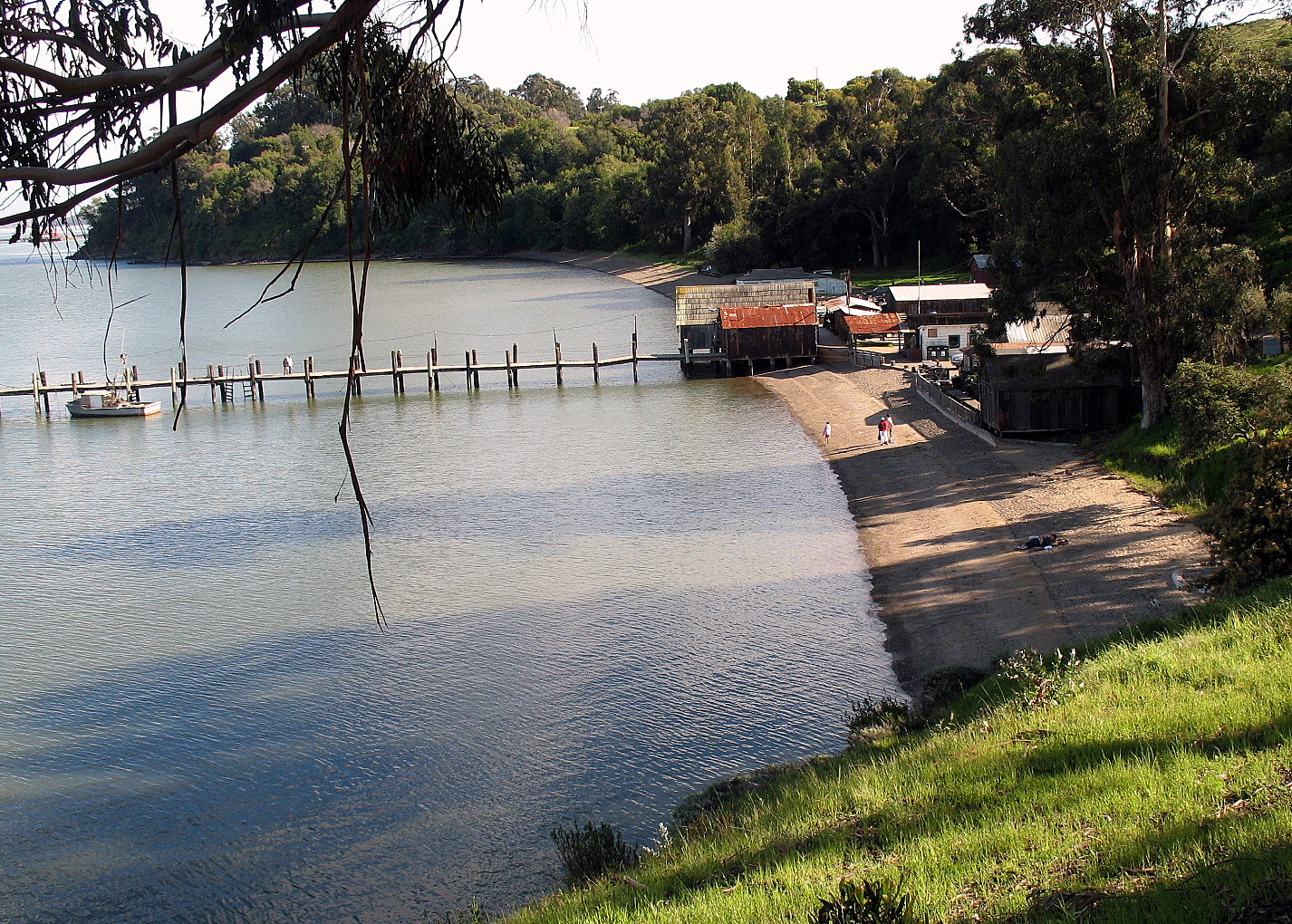
The historic shrimp fishing village at China Camp, in San Rafael, California

Italian fishermen began catching shrimp in San Francisco Bay around 1869, followed by Chinese fishermen in 1871, using traditional bag nets imported from China. Soon, immigrant Chinese fishermen from Guangdong dominated shrimp fishing in Northern California. The Chinese also fished for shrimp in nearby Tomales Bay, but those fisheries were abandoned in the 1890s. Junks were built at several places along the West Coast of the United States by Chinese shipwrights using traditional techniques and local lumber.

By the end of the 19th century, dozens of traditional Chinese shrimp fishing junks built in California were operating on the bay. As many as nine to ten million pounds of shrimp were harvested from the bay annually before restrictions on the fishery were imposed.

Although a small quantity of shrimp were sold locally, most were boiled and dried, resulting in a shelf-stable product that was exported to China and Hawaii. Drying resulted in two products: one third by weight the higher-grade product, called dried shrimp meat, which was used for human consumption, and two thirds the lower-grade product, called shrimp meal, which was used for fish food and plant fertilizer.

Political opposition to the fishery began in 1885, based on the assumption that bycatch in the Chinese nets was killing large numbers of desirable young fish, especially salmon and striped bass. The opposition was exacerbated by the prevalent anti-Chinese sentiment in California in the late 19th century. Studies showed that the concerns were greatly exaggerated, and that the fishermen ate or gave away the edible fish. A 1932 report concluded that "the average striped bass is too spry to be taken in any such rig." Restrictive regulations were implemented, beginning in 1901 with an annual four-month closure of the fishery during the height of the season, a ban on the export of dried shrimp in 1905, followed by a ban on Chinese nets in 1911, forcing a switch to beam trawl nets, which required motorized boats. Arrests of Chinese fishing crews were common in the first decade of the 20th century. The ban on exports was lifted in 1919, leading to a tripling in production in the 1920s.

California state fishery records show that in 1930, the catch was 2,687,831 pounds of shrimp from the bay, 35 boats were operating, and 72 men were employed. There were 12 shrimp fishing camps at Hunter's Point in San Francisco, and two in Marin County, including China Camp. Only a handful of traditional sail powered junks remained in service, and most of the boats were converted motorized junks or Western style fishing boats.

The fishery went into a steep decline in 1936, due to a collapse in the export market due to the ongoing effects of the Great Depression and the intensification of war and revolution in China. After World War II, the fishery was limited to a much lower volume catch for local sale as fishing bait. Third-generation Chinese-American shrimp fisherman Frank Quan had continued small-volume shrimp fishing into the 21st century, living in China Camp until dying at age 90.

== Construction ==
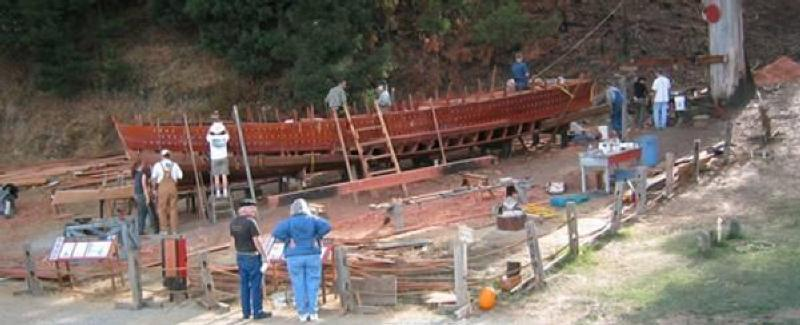
Construction of Grace Quan in 2003

The kernel of the idea that eventually became Grace Quan goes back to 1995, when John C. Muir, now a Curator of Small Craft, SF Maritime Historical Park, while an undergraduate student, ran across an old photo of a Chinese junk sailing along the San Francisco waterfront. Muir is a distant relative of the John Muir, the famous conservationist of the same name. While pursuing a master's degree, Muir excavated the wrecks of two junks at China Camp and took measurements. He later visited shipyards in Guangdong that still build wooden commercial fishing boats and studied their traditional construction methods. Muir later developed a proposal to build a replica of a late 19th century Chinese-style fishing junk, using the materials and techniques that were used to build similar boats in California.

Muir negotiated an agreement between the two parks to build the junk using volunteer labor and redwood lumber for most of the hull, milled from logs donated by a conservation group. Construction began in March, 2003. Traditional Chinese shipbuilding techniques were used, such as flame bending of planks, and edge-nailing using hand forged nails. Joints between the planks were sealed using traditional caulk made by volunteers out of a mixture of lime and linseed oil. This substance is called chu'nam, and also includes organic fibers, such as animal hair, grasses or bamboo fiber.

The keel was laid on April 24, 2003, and the junk was launched on October 25, 2003. At the launch ceremony, it was announced that the junk would be named Grace Quan, in honor of Frank Quan's mother.

== Specifications ==
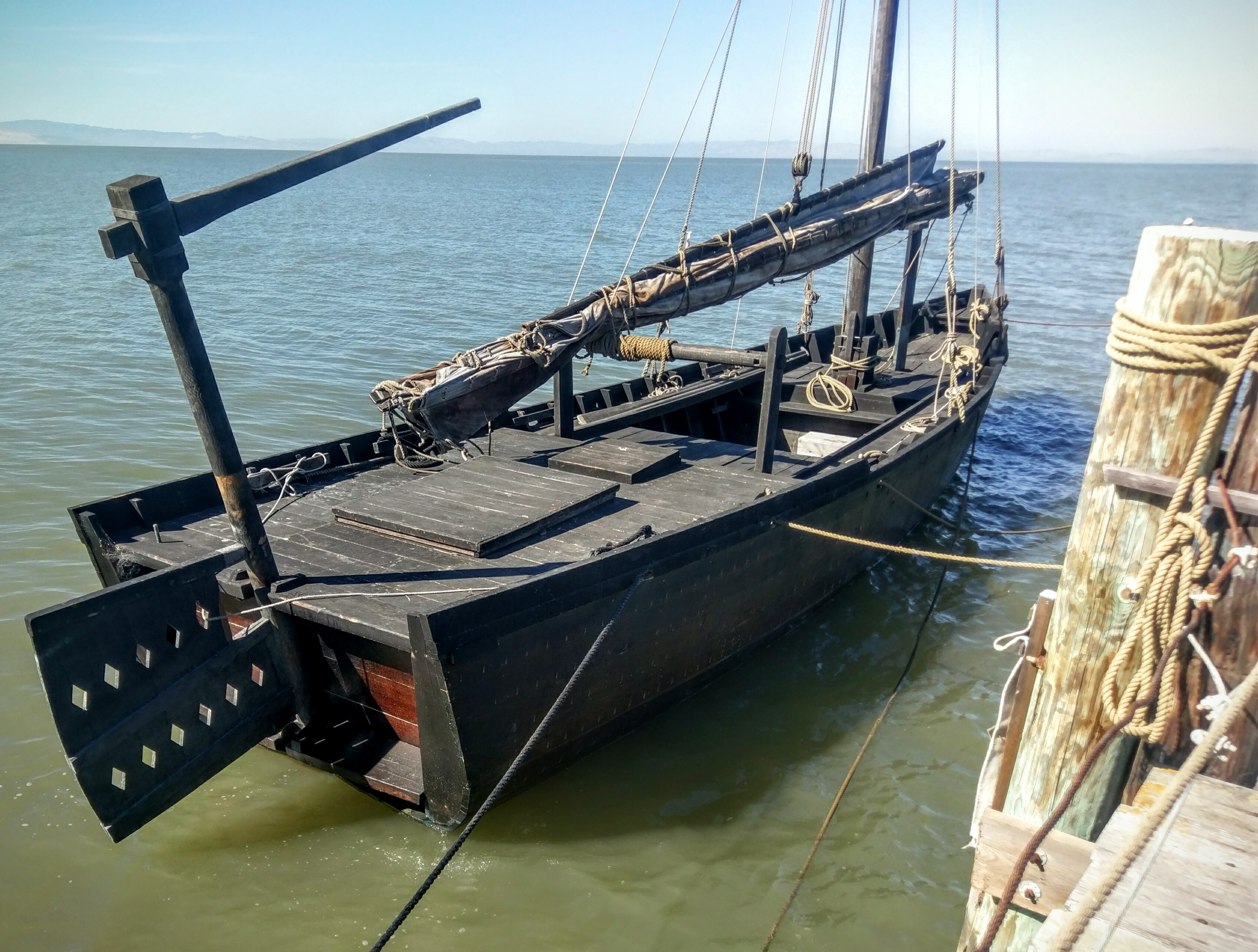
Grace Quan docked at China Camp State Park

Grace Quan is 42 feet 3 inches (12.88 m) long and its beam (width) is 10 feet 4 inches (3.15 m). It is a catboat rigged with a single mast.

Its draft with the daggerboard and rudder down is 5 feet (1.5 m). Its draft with the daggerboard and rudder raised is 1-foot (0.30 m).

The junk is built of lumber native to California. The keel, planks, frames and deck are made of redwood. The mast, stem, thwarts and oars are made of Douglas fir. The mast was made from an 80 foot tall Douglas fir tree from Napa County.

The oars include a traditional Chinese sculling oar called a yuloh, used from the stern, and a pair of oars that can be used from the bow. These oars allow the crews of shrimp fishing junks to maneuver around the fixed nets when the wind is not blowing.

The boat's sail is made of cotton, and is treated with tanbark oak which helps weatherproof the sail, and gives the sail its distinctive tan colour. The sail has six wooden battens, which contribute to its distinctive appearance.

== Operations ==
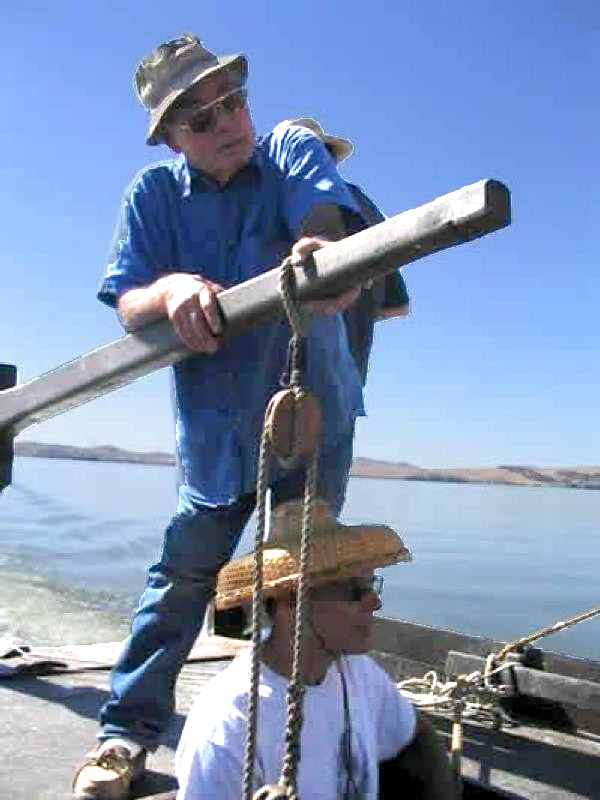
Frank Quan at the tiller of Grace Quan

In 2005, Grace Quan sailed from San Francisco Bay to Sacramento, where schoolchildren toured the boat.

The junk is docked at the San Francisco Maritime National Historical Park at Hyde Street Pier in the winter and at China Camp State Park in San Rafael in the summer. It sails between these locations twice a year, a distance of about 15 nautical miles.

In 2014, in the research-based art and civic engagement project Bay Chronicles created and directed by Rene Yung of cultural and arts organization Chinese Whispers, and produced in collaboration with the San Francisco Maritime National Historical Park, Grace Quan voyaged around San Francisco Bay to retrace the history of Chinese shrimp fishing on the Bay, visiting former sites of historic Chinese immigrant shrimp fishing villages, including Richmond, California, Hunters Point in San Francisco and Redwood City, California in the south bay. In addition to extensive public programming along the sail route, media captured on the expedition by the Chinese Whispers creative team was made into an immersive installation of the same title by Yung, for public education and enjoyment at the San Francisco Maritime National Historical Park Visitor Center.

== Significance ==
When the junk was being built, Phil Choy, a historian with the Chinese Historical Society of America, said, "This project dispels the perception that all Chinese were laundrymen and houseboys and cooks. They had know-how. They were enterprising and resourceful."

Rene Yung, director of Chinese Whispers, said in 2014 that "The historic Chinese immigrant experience in America was marked by oppression and erasure of their contributions from national memory. The once-thriving Chinese shrimping industry and community around San Francisco Bay is one of these forgotten stories." She described the journey of Grace Quan in Chinese Whispers: Bay Chronicles as a tribute to "this pioneer community and San Francisco's maritime heritage."
