= San Rafael Bay =

Bay in California, United States

Coordinates: 37°57′50″N 122°28′39″W

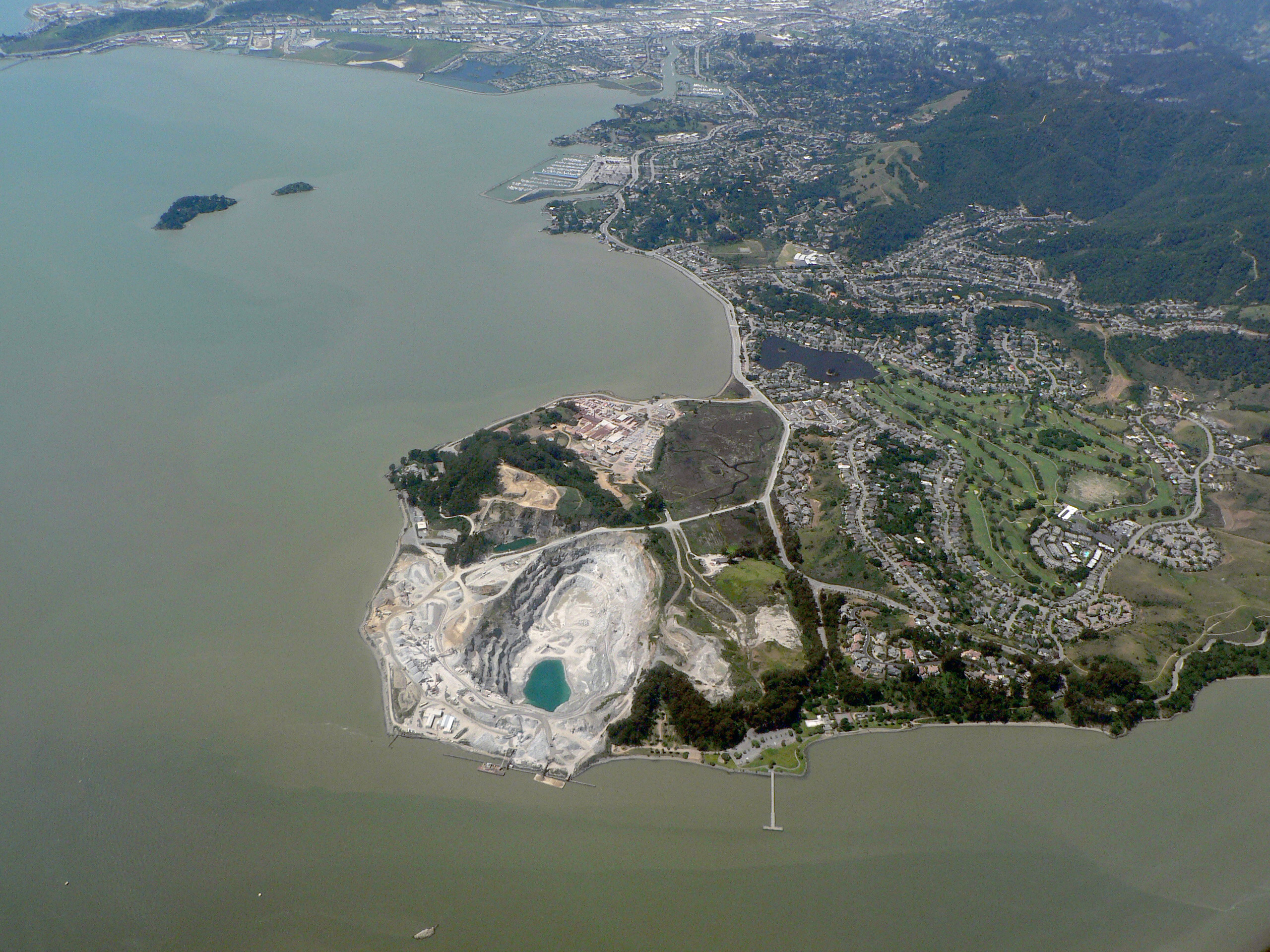
San Rafael Bay. Areas shown include the San Rafael rock quarry, Peacock Gap Golf and Country Club (right center), China Camp State Park (right rear) on Point San Pedro, along with the city of San Rafael (behind the point), and Marin Islands (left rear).

San Rafael Bay is an embayment of San Pablo Bay, located in Marin County and the northern San Francisco Bay Area, California.

== Geography ==
San Pablo Bay is the northern bay section of the larger San Francisco Bay, in the North Bay region.

San Rafael Bay is located along the Marin County coast, adjacent to the City of San Rafael.

The Marin Islands are within bay. The river mouth and estuary of San Rafael Creek is located at its shoreline.

== See also ==
- San Pablo Bay topics
