= Stafford Lake County Park =

Coordinates: 38.1148°N 122.6516°W

View over the course and Lake from the 6th tee.

Stafford Lake County Park is a park in the Marin County, California parks system, managed by the Marin County Department of Parks and Open Space. The 139 acres (0.56 km^{2}) park is located in Novato, 33 miles (53 km) north of San Francisco California and is in a classic northern California valley among grazing farmland.

The lake is man-made and there is no boating or swimming allowed. The land in the park includes lakefront fields, creek, meadows and some redwood groves, and is named for the Stafford Farm, on which the lake sits. The park hosts many events such as concerts, known as Rock'n Blues by the Lake, with bands such as Journey, Yonder Mountain String Band and Jefferson Starship. For a number of years the park hosted the Marin Renaissance fair.

== Bike park ==
In mid-2017, a bike park was added to Stafford Lake, featuring courses of all skill levels and great views of the lake. The park is currently being expanded.

== Disc golf ==
The disc golf course was first constructed as an object course in 1993 and baskets were installed in 1997. In 2007, three concrete tees were installed. The course is long by most standards and is very hilly, and in turn very challenging. Walking the course is approximately a 4-mile (6.4 km) walk and is mildly strenuous due to the very hilly nature of the terrain. Each of the 18 holes have one or two tees and two to five pin locations, with a total of 60 basket locations in total. Course length can vary from 5,224 feet (1,592 m) if all holes were short to 7,743 feet (2,360 m) if all holes were in long. The 'traditional' layout is a hefty 6,625 feet (2,019 m).

== Gallery ==
View of Lake from 3rd Tee of the course.

Looking at the 14th hole of the course towards the lake.

== See also ==
- List of lakes in California
- List of lakes in the San Francisco Bay Area
