= Lake Stafford =

Lake in the state of Florida, United States

- Location within Florida
- Location: Levy County, Florida
- Coordinates: 29°18′35″N 82°28′44″W
- Type: lake
- Surface elevation: 56 ft (17 m)

Lake Stafford is located in Levy County, Florida with an altitude of 56 feet (17 m). It is one of a "few major standing bodies of fresh water in or adjoining Levy County", along with Chunky Pond and Lake Rousseau, although "there are a number of ponds in these lowlands and perched on aquacludes in the highlands".
