= China Camp State Park =

Park in San Rafael, California

- China Camp
- U.S. National Register of Historic Places
- U.S. Historic district
- California Historical Landmark
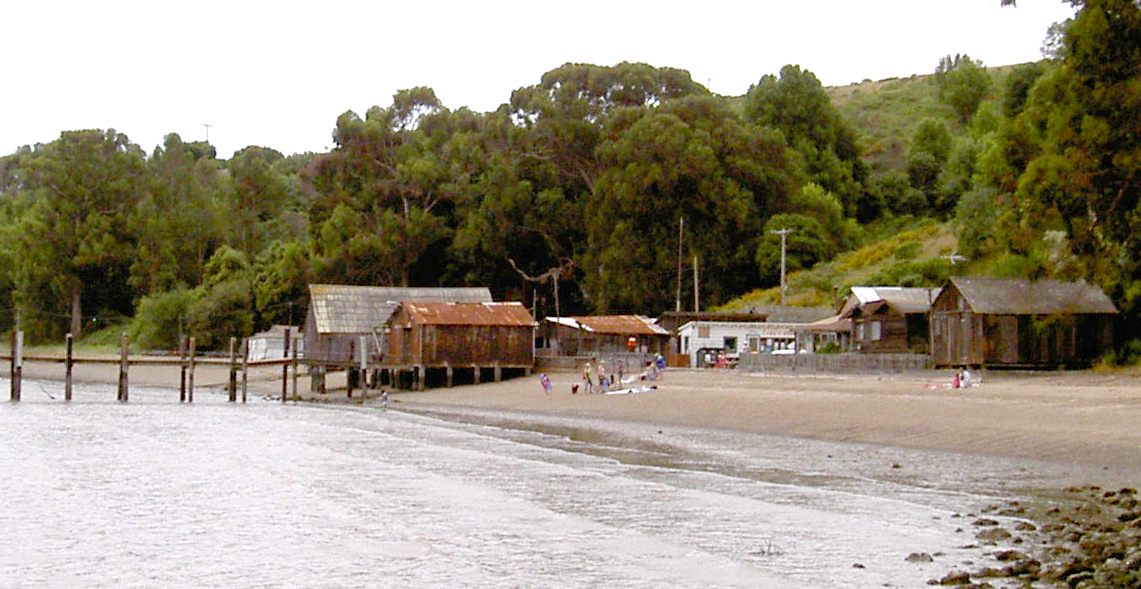
- China Camp in 2010

- Location within California Location within the United States
- Location: San Rafael, California
- Coordinates: 38°0′3″N 122°27′41″W
- Area: 75 acres (30 ha)
- Built: 1865–1925
- NRHP reference No.: 79000493
- CHISL No.: 924
- Added to NRHP: April 26, 1979

China Camp State Park is a state park in Marin County, California, surrounding a historic Chinese American shrimp-fishing village and a salt marsh. The park is located in San Rafael, California, on the shore of San Pablo Bay. It is known for its hiking and mountain biking trails, scenic views, and open spaces. The 1,514-acre (613 ha) park was established in 1976. A 75-acre (30 ha) district, including the shrimping village and a prehistoric shell midden, were added to the National Register of Historic Places in 1979 for having state-level significance in archaeology, architecture, commerce, settlement, and social history. China Camp State Park, along with the Rush Ranch Open Space Preserve, is part of the San Francisco Bay National Estuarine Research Reserve.

== History ==
=== Pre-Chinese settlement ===
Prior to the 1700s, the area now containing the park was inhabited by indigenous Coast Miwok people, who lived by hunting, harvesting acorns from the local oaks, and fishing and gathering seafood from the bay. After the 1775 arrival of the Spanish, who founded the nearby Mission San Rafael Arcángel, the Miwok were largely wiped out within 100 years.

In 1844, the Spanish granted much of the land that now comprises the park to Timothy Murphy, an Irish settler who became mayor (alcalde) of San Rafael. Following the United States takeover of California in 1846, Murphy lost most of his land and subsequently died, and the land came into the possession of John and George McNear, two Sonoma County businessmen who established a large dairy ranch and other businesses, such as a quarry and brickyard, on the site. These businesses employed a number of Chinese immigrants, who began to settle in the area.

=== Chinese settlement ===
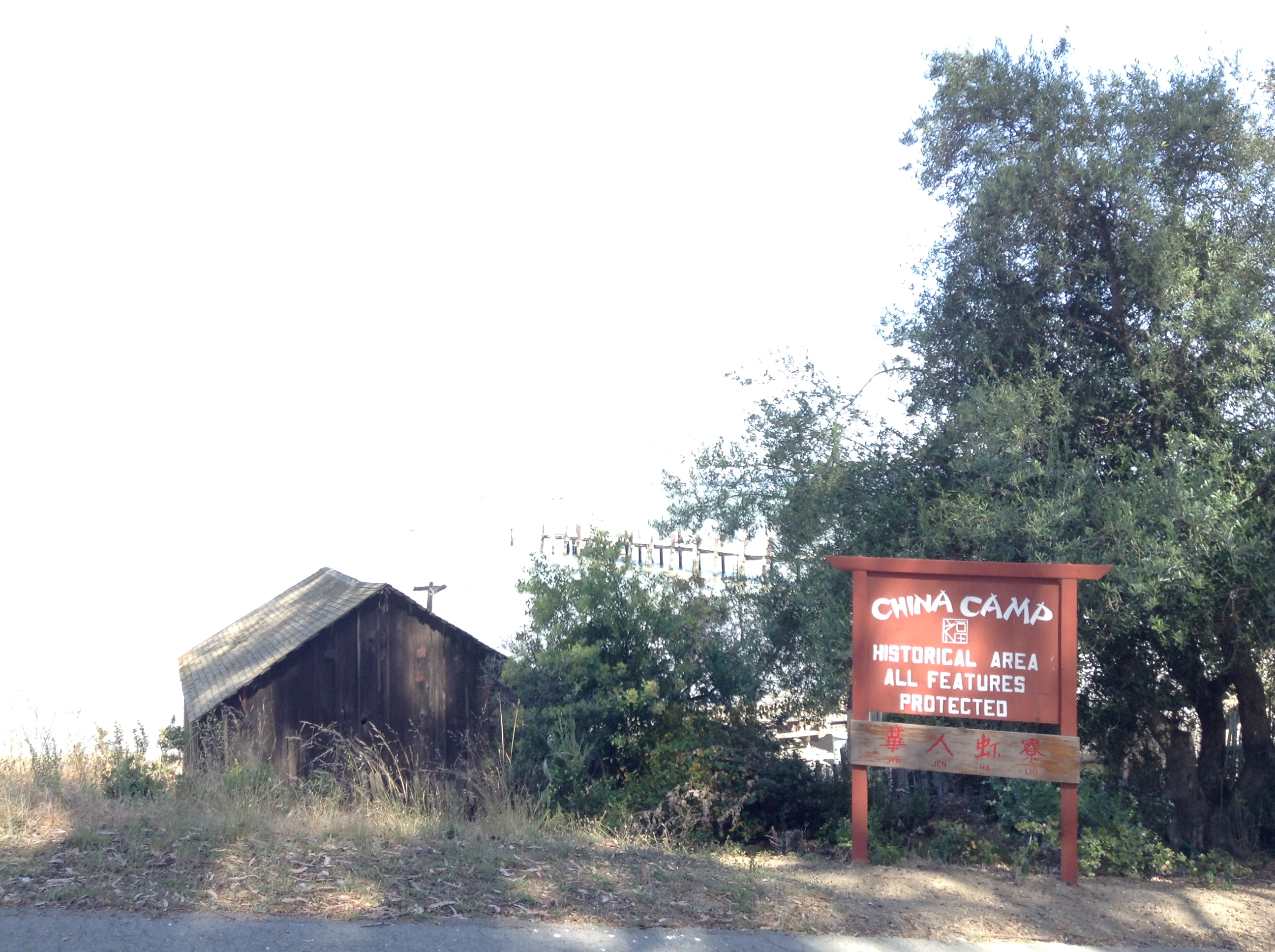
Sign for China Camp State Park

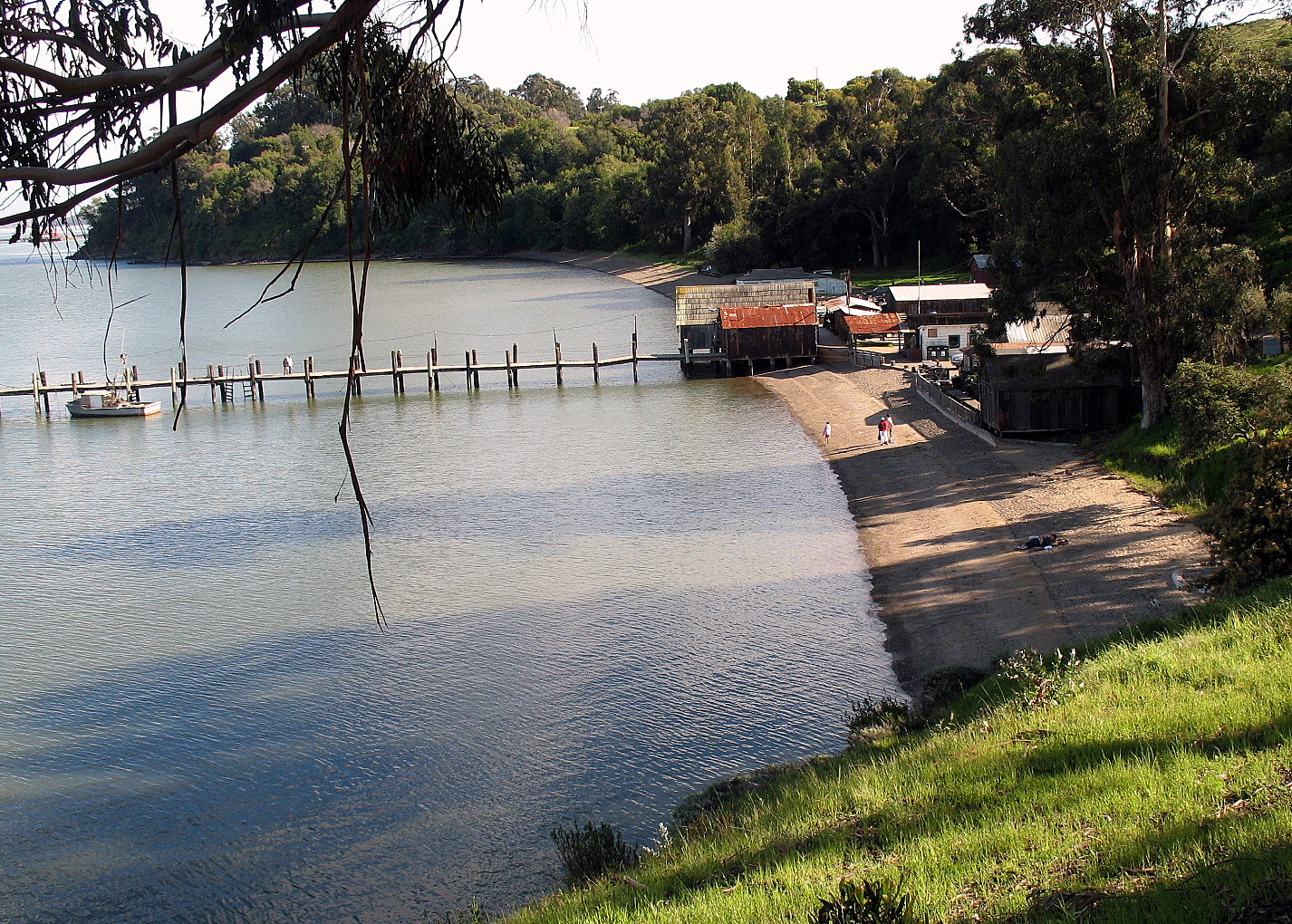
The Chinese shrimp fishing village in 2010

By the 1880s, Chinese Americans had established a village at China Camp of approximately 500 people, many of whom were originally from Canton, China. They supported themselves by shrimp fishing in San Pablo Bay or working at local businesses. In its heyday, the village had three general stores, a marine supply store and a barber shop. China Camp was one of approximately 26 such shrimp-fishing villages established along the coast by Chinese Americans, many of whom had moved from San Francisco to escape racial prejudice and persecution. For a brief time following the 1906 San Francisco earthquake and fire, China Camp's population increased to 10,000 as residents of San Francisco's Chinatown fled from the destruction.

In the late 1800s, the Chinese American fishermen of China Camp would catch 3 million pounds (1.4 million kilograms) of shrimp per year, much of which was exported to China and Hawaii. However, the economy of the village was severely harmed by the passage of laws in the early 1900s that outlawed the export of shrimp, closed the height of the shrimping season, and prohibited shrimping with bag nets which were the main method of catching shrimp. As a result, the population of China Camp greatly declined, leaving only one family — the Quans — carrying on shrimp fishing.

In 1914, a new net, the trawl, was invented, which made it possible for the Quans to resume their commercial shrimp fishing enterprise and process 5,000 pounds of shrimp per day. They also operated other businesses such as a general store, a boat rental, and a cafe, which served both villagers and visitors who came to the area for outdoor recreation.

=== Establishment of state park ===
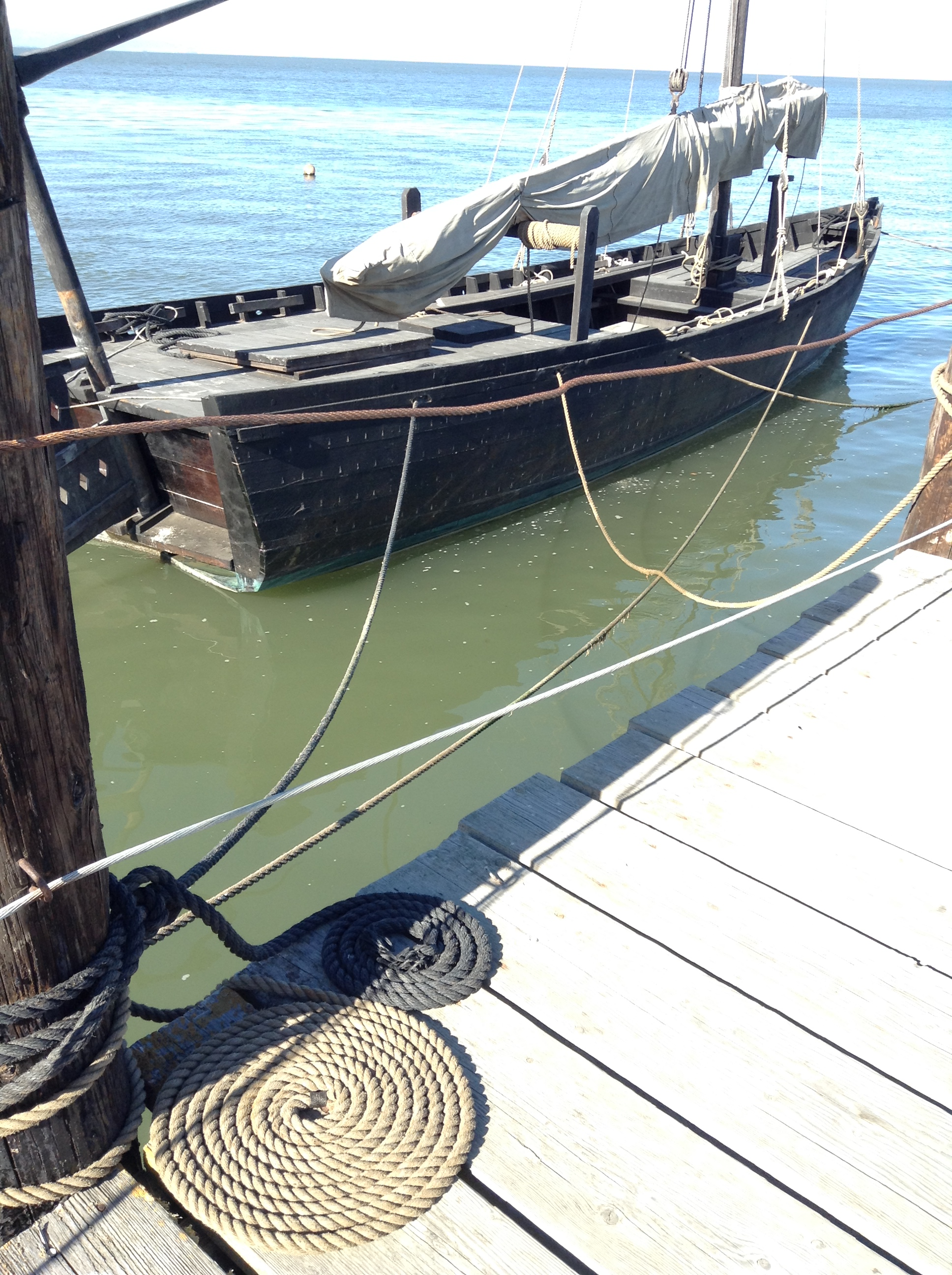
Boat tied up off pier at China Camp State Park

By the 1960s, most of the surrounding area, including the future park lands, was owned or controlled by developer Chinn Ho. The shrimp population of San Pablo Bay had also greatly declined due to water pollution and diversion, although Frank Quan, the grandson of the original Quan patriarch who came to China Camp and the last remaining Quan family member living there, continued to fish, selling most of his catch for bait.

In the early 1970s, Gulf Oil expressed interest in large-scale development of the area, including high-rise condominiums and large commercial areas. Local residents and environmental and conservation groups protested the plan, and as a result, the land was sold for approximately $2.3 million in 1976 to the nonprofit California State Parks Foundation, who in turn sold it to the state of California to create China Camp State Park. Chinn Ho donated the 36-acre (15 ha) site of China Camp village for preservation as a memorial to Chinese American history. The general plan established for the park specifically provided that Frank Quan would be permitted to continue living in the village.

==== 1975 Barbecue murders ====
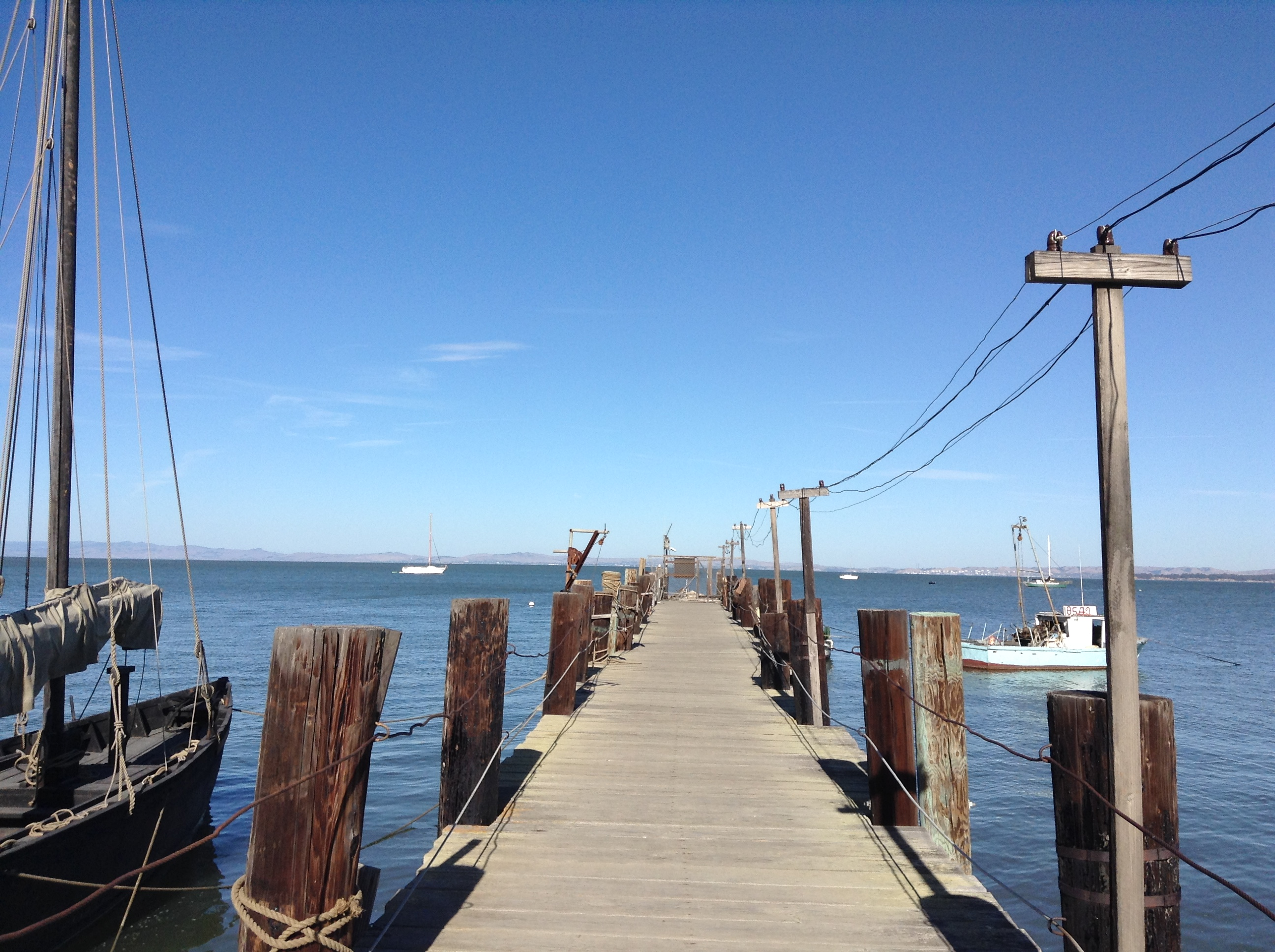
Pier at China Camp State Park

The park is also known for the 1975 barbecue murders, in which a local teenager, Marlene Olive, and her boyfriend, Chuck Riley, killed her parents, Jim and Naomi Olive, in the nearby suburban community of Terra Linda and then tried to dispose of the bodies by cremating them in a barbecue pit (firepit) at the park.

=== 2011 proposed closure controversy ===
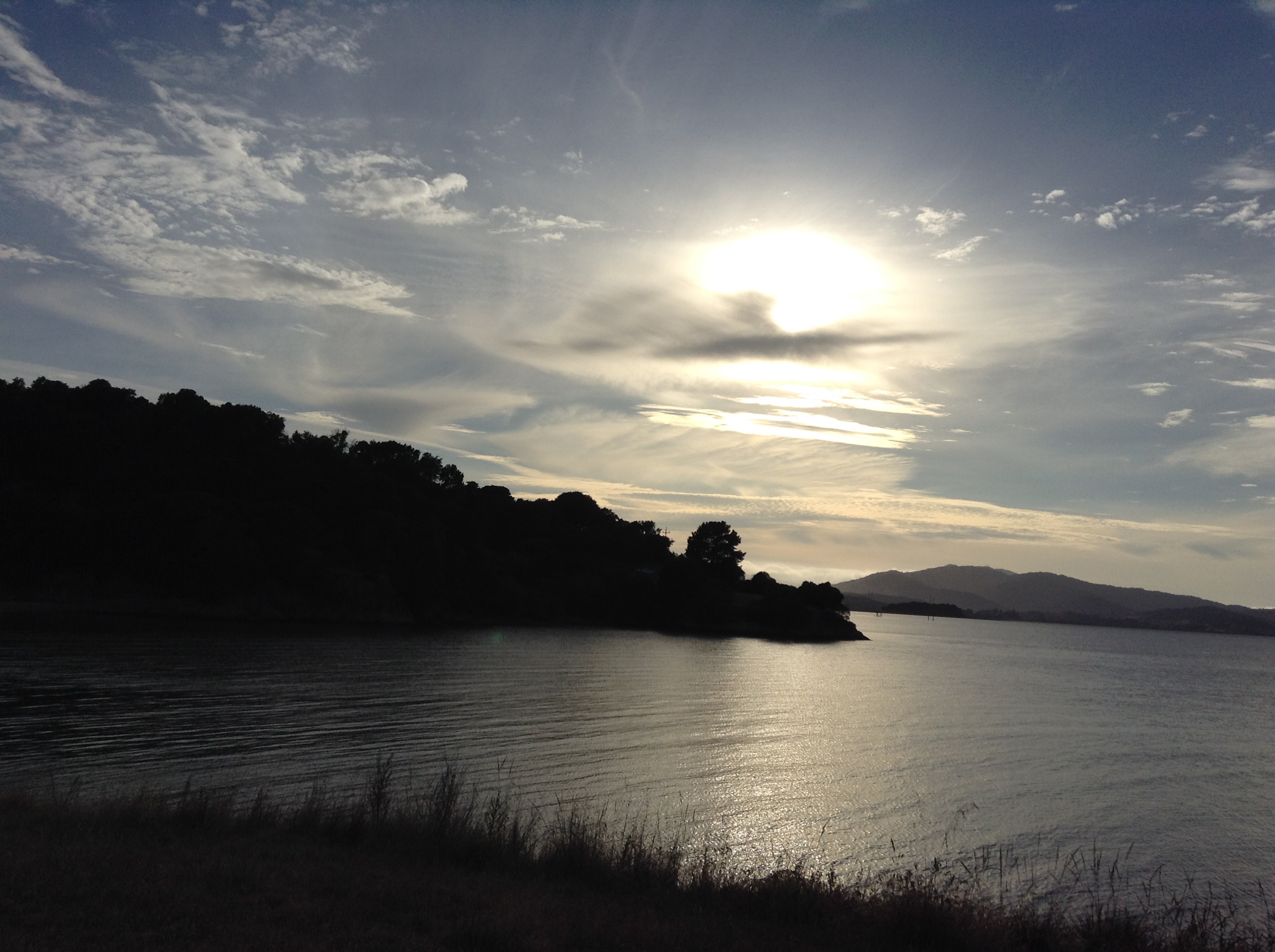
The sun shines through the clouds at China Camp

In 2011, China Camp State Park was one of 70 parks slated for closure by the state of California in connection with a $22 million state budget cut. Marin County residents voiced concern that if closed, the park could fall into disrepair, including the historic Chinese village which, according to Frank Quan — then 85 years old and the last remaining resident of the village — was the last of the 26 coastal Chinese fishing villages with enough original structures left to preserve. The California state parks department claimed that China Camp State Park was running at a deficit and that it lacked the money to keep it and other parks open.

The nonprofits Marin State Parks Association and Friends of China Camp, along with various other residents and community groups, protested the closure and raised funds to save the park. After an investigation by the Sacramento Bee revealed that the state parks department had an undeclared budget surplus of $54 million, leading to the resignation of the state parks director and the firing of her assistant, an agreement was reached under which China Camp State Park would be jointly funded by the state parks department and the Marin State Park Association, which would also operate the park. Similar agreements were reached for two other Marin County state parks, Olompali State Historic Park and Tomales Bay State Park.

A revised agreement in 2013 returned operation of Olompali and Tomales Bay parks to the state, while the nonprofit organization Friends of China Camp continues to operate China Camp State Park, with no funding from the state.

Frank Quan died in August 2016, at age 90, while still living at the park.

== Activities ==
The park offers a variety of outdoor activities, including overnight camping, picnic facilities, hiking and biking trails, kayaking, paddleboarding, and sailing.

China Camp also celebrates a Chinese-American Heritage Day each August, with lion dances, acrobatic and tai chi demonstrations, arts and crafts sales, activities for children, and a visit by the replica Chinese junk Grace Quan and other historic boats.

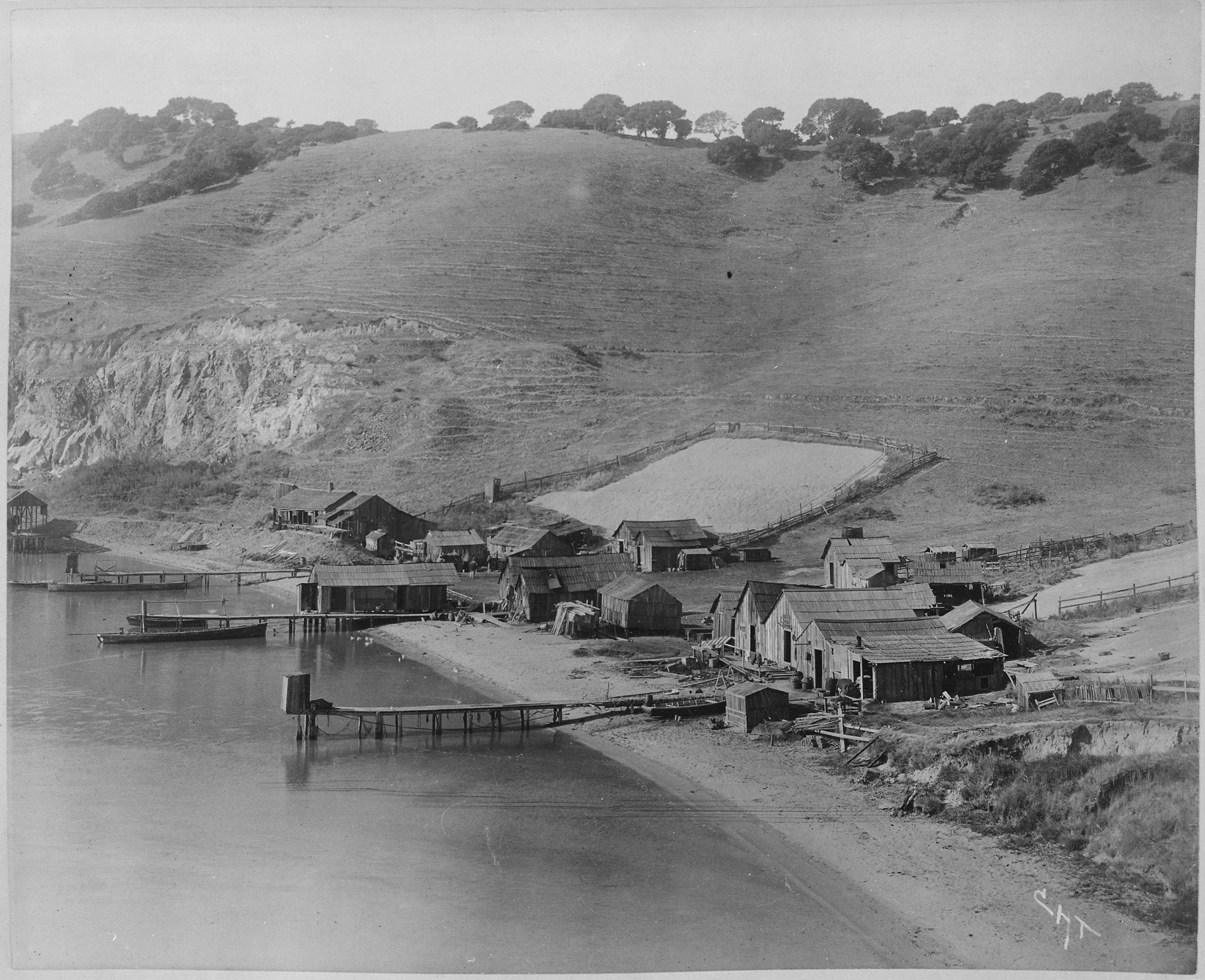
China Camp in 1889

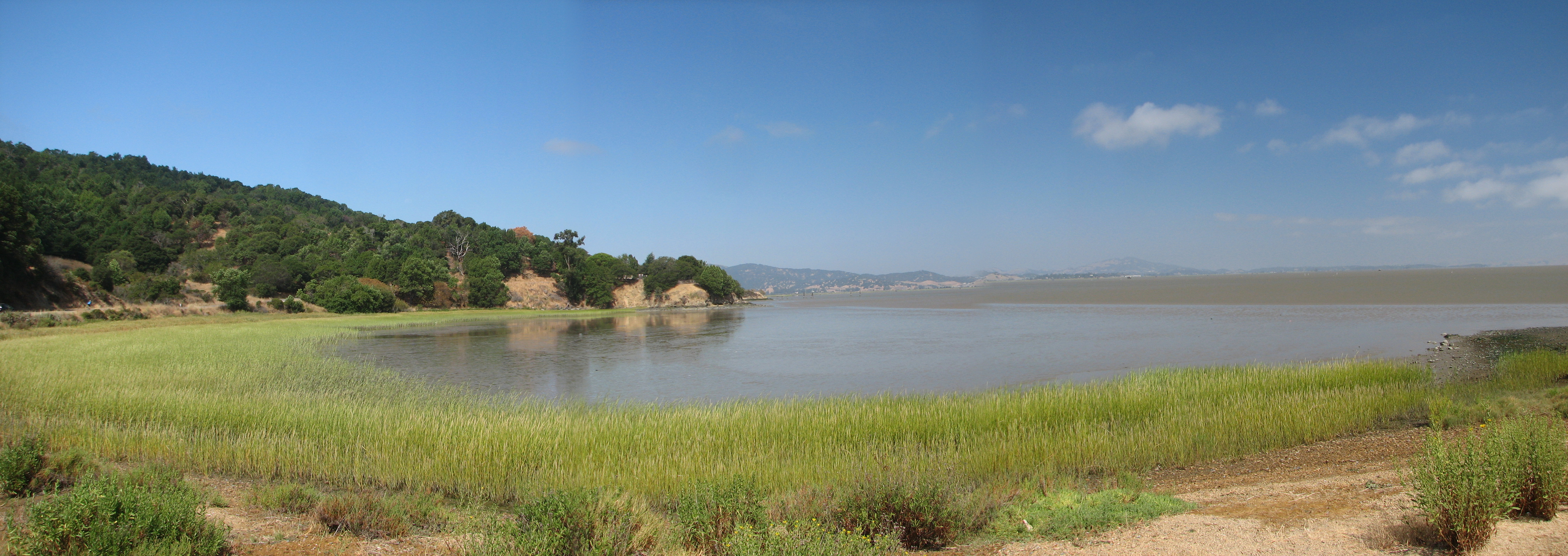
Bay view from China Camp State Park

== In popular culture ==
The Chinese fishing village at China Camp was used extensively in the filming of the 1955 movie Blood Alley, starring John Wayne as a captain in the United States Merchant Marine who rescues Chinese refugees from Communist China and transports them to British Hong Kong.

In 2018, China Camp was used as a filming location for the Netflix drama 13 Reasons Why. The park has also been used as a filming location for the 2012 HBO television film Hemingway & Gellhorn.

== See also ==
- History of Chinese Americans
- List of California state parks
- National Register of Historic Places listings in Marin County, California
