= Mountains and Rivers Without End (disambiguation) =

Mountains and Rivers Without End is a 1996 epic poem by American poet Gary Snyder.

Mountains and Rivers Without End may also refer to:

- Streams and Mountains Without End, a silk scroll painting by the Korean artist Yi In-Mun
  - Mountains and Rivers Without End, a 1968 chamber symphony inspired by the painting by American composer Alan Hovhaness
