= Tamalpais High School =

Public secondary school in Mill Valley, California, United States

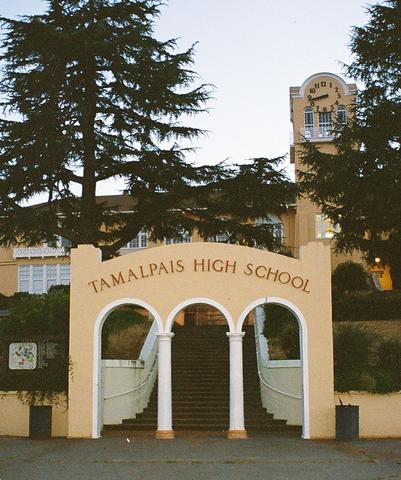

Location
- 700 Miller Avenue; Mill Valley, California 94941; United States; 37.8921°N 122.530751°W

Information
- Funding type: Public
- Founded: 1908
- School district: Tamalpais Union High School District
- Oversight: Western Association of Schools and Colleges, Accrediting Commission for Schools
- Principal: Kimberly Clissold
- Faculty: 81
- Teaching staff: 75.55 (FTE)
- Grades: 9–12
- Enrollment: 1,544 (2023–2024)
- Student to teacher ratio: 20.44
- Language: English
- Campus: Suburban
- Area: Southern Marin County
- Colors: Red, Royal Blue & White
- Mascot: Red-Tailed Hawk
- Team name: Red-Tailed Hawks
- Communities served: Mill Valley, Sausalito, Marin City, Strawberry, Tamalpais-Homestead Valley, Muir Beach, Bolinas and Stinson Beach.
- Feeder schools: Mill Valley School District; Sausalito Marin City School District; Bolinas-Stinson Union School District
- Website: tamalpais.tamdistrict.org

Tamalpais High School (often abbreviated as Tam) is a public secondary school located in Mill Valley, California, in the San Francisco Bay Area. It is named after nearby Mount Tamalpais, which rises almost 2,500 feet (760 m) above Mill Valley.

Tamalpais High School is the original campus of the Tamalpais Union High School District and the second public high school in Marin County. As of 2007, Tam's attendance area includes the cities of Mill Valley and Sausalito, the nearby unincorporated areas of Marin City, Strawberry and Tamalpais-Homestead Valley, and the West Marin communities of Muir Beach, Bolinas and Stinson Beach. Mill Valley School District is the largest feeder for Tam, followed by the Sausalito Marin City School District and the Bolinas-Stinson Union School District.

== History ==
Tamalpais Union High School District was founded in 1907, to serve students from the Mill Valley Elementary and Sausalito Elementary School Districts who had previously commuted to San Rafael to continue their education. Tamalpais Union High School held its first classes with 70 students in 1908, in tent-like structures. Ernest E. Wood took the lead in founding the District and was the first principal. In its second year, there were six teachers, 100 students, and 300 volumes in the school library. By the 1913–1914 school year, enrollment had increased to 175, with eight faculty; the library holdings had grown to 650 books plus subscriptions to eight magazines and two newspapers.

Known in its early years as Tamalpais Polytechnic High School, Tam was a comprehensive high school from its beginning, with a curriculum that included both academic subjects and technical training. In an interview with the local newspaper the year before he died, Principal Wood said, "I believe the students learned by doing things. I believe in the philosophy of students getting in and doing work and accomplishing things." Architecture students designed the first building on campus, and students built several structures there over the years.

For a while, the Northwestern Pacific Railroad ran what they called the "School Special, a special 5-car train running from Manor to Tamalpais High School via Almonte. 2 of the cars on the school special were separated by gender - 1 boys-only car and 1 girls-only car.

=== News ===
- On February 27, 1967, after a year of increased racial tension and disturbances, regular classes were canceled for "Breakthrough Day," a student-initiated teach-in on race relations. All students and faculty met in Mead Theater and then broke out into discussion groups around campus. The event was widely covered by local and national media.
- In 1981, Antenna Theater premiered Chris Hardman's High School at Tam during the fourth Bay Area Playwrights Festival. The work introduced Hardman's performance art concept, "Walkmanology," with Sony Walkmans providing the narration to audience members as they walked the Tam campus observing the story. In 1982, Antenna presented the Pink Prom at Tam. In this play, unrehearsed student actors wore the Walkmans, which provided their stage direction, while the audience interacted with the actors and each other. Antenna Theater later spun off its Walkmanology concept to Antenna Audio, which has become a leading international producer of audio tours for museums and other attractions.
- In the 1989–1990 school year, members of the student body petitioned to formally remove the school's original mascot "Indians" at the interdiction of Sacheen Littlefeather, a pretendian Marin County resident and activist for Native American causes. The original mascot had been chosen to recognize the area's indigenous inhabitants, the Miwoks, and was represented by illustrations (both dignified and caricature), costumed performers, and, beginning in the 1960s, a wooden sculpture named Charlie. Sports teams were identified only as "Tam" for the fall and winter seasons of that school year. A schoolwide contest was held, and the Red Tailed Hawks was chosen as the winner, beating out other entries such as Mountaineers and Locomotives. The Red Tailed Hawk logo and mascot was adopted beginning in the 1990–1991 school year. Tam High was one of the first American institutions to remove a "politically incorrect" Native American moniker. (Note: Although the hawk mascot is most commonly referred to as the Red-tailed Hawk or red-tailed hawk, with a hyphen, the mascot is styled as Red Tailed Hawk, using three capitalized words with no hyphen, by both the student newspaper and the alumni association.)
- On May 9, 1990, following the death of history teacher Charles Smith due to complications from AIDS, Principal Barbara Galyen announced that students had persuaded the administration to allow the school nurse to distribute free condoms. Tam would have been the first high school in California to dispense prophylactics without parent approval, were it not for the immediate uproar. The controversial plan was objected to by several parents, as well as San Francisco Archbishop John R. Quinn, all calling for it to be rescinded. The following week, after the parents of one student threatened to sue, the district postponed the program indefinitely. In June, Sausalito pharmacist Fred Mayer, originator of "Condom Week" in 1979, announced that he would give free condoms to high school students that summer. Despite the program being deferred, a suit was filed in June. On August 1, the Marin County Superior Court denied the request for an injunction, since the district had not approved the program. About 1990, Tam initiated the Condom Availability Program, which provides free condoms to students who have received parental permission and completed a training session.
- In 1997, Tam sophomore Ari Hoffman won a Marin County science fair, showing that fruit flies exposed to different doses of radiation had increased mutation rates and reduced fertility in proportion to the dose. He was subsequently disqualified from the Bay Area Science Fair when officials ruled that his experiment, which resulted in the premature death of 35 of the 200 drosophila, had violated rules on the use of live animals. After widespread news coverage, Hoffman was contacted by Nobel laureate Edward B. Lewis, a geneticist who had begun his own work with fruit flies while in high school. Lewis congratulated Hoffman for his work and sent him a check. The science fair prize was reinstated. (As of 2009, after graduating from Stanford University and completing classwork at the University of California San Francisco Medical School, Hoffman is a predoctoral fellow in bioethics in the Clinical Research Training Program at the intramural campus of the National Institutes of Health in Bethesda, Maryland.)
- Parents of four African-American students from Tam filed a class-action lawsuit against the Novato Unified School District and administrators at San Marin High School over racial slurs made by San Marin students at a basketball game in 1998, charging that a "climate of intolerance" was allowed at San Marin. The Marin County Athletic League put San Marin on probation for a year because of racial insensitivity.
- In 2001, students from Tam and other high schools in the TUHSD formed Marin Students for Liberating Education to discuss the number of prerequisite classes and level of testing. Large numbers of grade 9, 10, and 11 students at Tam and Drake High School boycotted the Stanford-9 achievement tests required by the State's STAR Program after their parents signed waivers. The boycott had been endorsed by school board member Richard Raznikov. Since more than 10% of the students missed the test (22% at Tam and 35% at Drake), the two schools were not given Academic Performance Index (API) rankings, making the schools ineligible for the funds distributed by the State to high-scoring schools. (The three comprehensive high schools in the District, Tam, Drake, and Redwood, received approximately $750,000 in 2000, including individual $1000 scholarships awarded to 339 high-scoring students). Raznikov resigned from the board of trustees in 2002, citing the testing controversy among the reasons.
- Tam was the subject of local controversy during the 2004–2005 school year when several anti-gay crimes, targeting a 17-year-old female student wrestler, received coverage in the Associated Press and the local newspapers. When the police investigation suggested the "crimes" were staged, they confronted the "victim" with the evidence causing the student to confess to the hoax. Subsequent coverage of the hoax received even greater attention in the media and blogosphere.
- On January 4, 2006, the former president of Tam's Associated Student Body, Nima Shaterian, took his own life. A citywide memorial was held in Mill Valley. In January 2007, junior Clive Barry also committed suicide.
- In May 2006, controversy over use of a rifle in a physics class demonstration received national coverage. Teacher David Lapp, a military veteran and avid hunter, had fired his M1 carbine into a wooden block in his physics classes almost every year since 1992 to allow his students to calculate the muzzle velocity of the bullet based on conservation of momentum. After an anonymous complaint from a parent, local police and the district attorney investigated, found no illegality and dropped the case. The experiment had been authorized by the school administration, but the administration responded to pressure by banning the experiment.
- In August 2006, physical education teacher and tennis coach Norm Burgos was arrested and charged with sexual battery against a former member of the boys tennis team. The player had been 16 years old in 2002 or 2003, when the alleged event occurred. Burgos pleaded innocent and has received public support from players and their families. Burgos was charged in July 2008 with similar behavior with two other boys. On October 7, 2008, after Burgos had been on unpaid suspension for two years, the Tamalpais Union High School District board of trustees voted to terminate him. In 2011, the jury voted 8–4 to convict Burgos on felony charges in the Superior Court of Marin County. He was later arrested and sentenced to prison.
- Misbehavior by parents of San Marin High School basketball players on February 2, 2008, in two games with Tam teams led to drafting of the first code-of-conduct contracts for parents of athletes at a Marin County school. Following a girls junior varsity game at Tam, the mother of a San Marin player followed two referees, shouting obscene insults; later, at San Marin, two parents of San Marin players confronted Tam's coach after he made a gesture indicating that the home team had "choked." Novato police were called and the parents were later asked not to attend the remaining games of the season. Tam Principal Chris Holleran said that the coach's behavior was inappropriate, but declined to discuss possible disciplinary action.
- The firings of three nontenured math teachers in February 2014 sparked bitter divisions between administrators, teachers, students, and parents. Under state law, administrators may dismiss nontenured teachers without due process; despite several petitions and protests, TUHSD's board of trustees voted to uphold the dismissals in a public forum held March 12, 2014. Critics of the firings alleged that they were politically motivated actions against the Tam math department, which had questioned district instructional policies and had not cooperated with administrators' attempts to introduce a controversial, highly costly instructional program.
- On November 30, 2022, a bomb threat was targeted towards the school, prompting evacuation during the first period of the day.
- On December 10, 2024, another bomb threat was targeted towards the school, also prompting evacuation. A student took photos of the event and posted them on social media, under the username ambum.stone, falsely labelling the event as a walkout for alleged CEO assassin, Luigi Mangione. These posts went viral on TikTok and Twitter, until they were taken down for community guidelines violations after the US TikTok ban in January.

=== Tam High Foundation ===
In 1996, Principal Frank Gold and a group of parents formed the nonprofit Tam High Foundation to raise funds for support of the school. The Foundation raised $60,000 its first year, increasing annual funding to $360,000 by 2007–2008. The foundation awards academic grants of up to $10,000 to teachers and administrators.

=== Centennial ===
Tam's first 100 years, 1908 to 2008, were widely recognized in local media. The Tam Centennial Committee, which included the principal, alumni, parents, retired faculty, and others, began meeting in 2006. The centennial celebration began with kickoff events on Homecoming Weekend in September 2007. Several events were scheduled for the year, including a Tam Oral History Project, a centennial documentary, and a celebration over the 2008 Memorial Day weekend.

== Campus ==
Initially consisting of only a couple of tents on a shore front campus that allowed students to take their boats to school, the Tamalpais campus was fully developed over the years, but has seen its share of wear and tear. Following a 2004 bond measure, the campus underwent renovations to some of its nearly century-old buildings. The oldest building, Wood Hall, reopened in late August 2005. Wood Hall houses the school's administrative offices.

The 2005–2006 academic year was delayed by five days when unhealthy levels of mold were discovered in the walls of Keyser Hall. The building was closed, and portable classrooms were used instead of Keyser's 17 classrooms. The mold grew due to runoff from the hillside the building was situated on. Keyser Hall was demolished during the summer of 2006; a state-of-the-art replacement structure, also named Keyser Hall, was opened in January 2009. School administrators are consulting with architects about the construction of a handicapped elevator in front of the school's most recognizable building, Wood Hall. Architects unveiled a plan for a four-story elevator tower in front of the school's signature archway, complete with a bridge to take handicapped students into the building. Staff were shocked at the drastic proposal, which would be costly and would have an extensive impact on many of the campus' most well-known architectural features. An elevator of some sort may be necessary to comply with handicapped accessibility laws. Administrators have formed a committee to look into alternative ways to provide that accessibility.

== Statistics ==
=== Demographics ===
2014–2015

- 1,321 students: 642 Male (48.6%), 679 Female (51.4%)

White	Hispanic	Asian	African American	Two or More Races	Filipino	Native American	Pacific Islander	Not Reported
918	128	88	58	50	16	5	5	53
69.5%	9.7%	6.7%	4.4%	3.8%	1.2%	0.4%	0.4%	4%

=== Standardized testing ===
SAT Scores for 2013–2014
	Critical Reading Average	Math Average	Writing Average
Tamalpais High	579	572	576
District	575	578	573
Statewide	495	511	493

2013 Academic Performance Index
2009 Base API	2013 Growth API	Growth in the API from 2009 to 2013
868	868	0

== Extracurricular activities ==
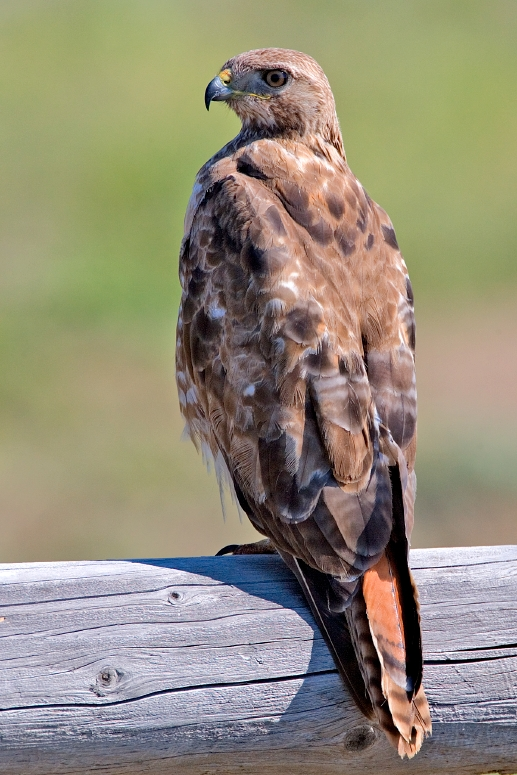
Red-tailed hawk (Buteo jamaicensis)—since 1991, the sports teams have been called the Red Tailed Hawks or, more simply, the Hawks

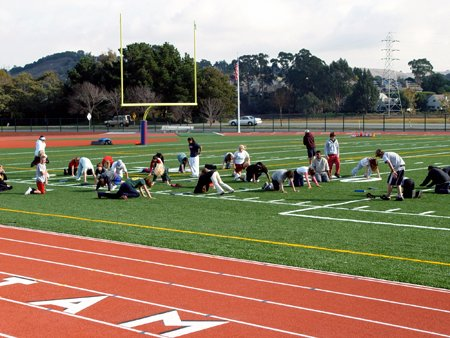
Students work out on the track and field of Tamalpais High School, October 2004

=== Sports ===
Tam has competed in the Marin County Athletic League (MCAL) since the league was established in 1959. The MCAL is in the Marin-Sonoma-Mendocino Conference, North Coast Section (NCS), of the California Interscholastic Federation (CIF). Prior to the 1959 realignment, Tam was a member of the old North Bay League. In the 1920s, the NBL included Analy High School, Napa High School, Petaluma High School, San Rafael High School, Santa Rosa High School, St. Helena High School, and Vallejo High School.

Through the 1940s and early 1950s, Tam played against NBL teams from Healdsburg, Napa, San Rafael, Santa Rosa, and Vallejo; non-league opponents included Analy and Petaluma. In the 1950s, Drake and Marin Catholic joined the League.

The MCAL offers competition in 21 sports as of 2010, including baseball, cross country, football, softball, swimming and diving, track and field, and wrestling. Separate teams for boys and girls compete in basketball, golf, lacrosse, soccer, tennis, volleyball, and water polo. The only NCS sport that MCAL does not participate in is badminton.

==== State and North Coast Section team championships ====
- Baseball – NCS Champions, 1929, 2014 (Division III); NCS second-place, 1920, 1928, and 2012
- Basketball, Boys – NCS Division IV and State Champions, 2000
- Cross Country, Boys – NCS Division IV Team Champions, 2008
- Cross Country, Girls – NCS Meet of Champions, 1975; NCS Class A Champions, 1977
- Golf, Boys – NCS Co-Champions, 1980
- Soccer, Boys – NCS Champions, 2000, 2012
- Soccer, Girls – NCS Champions, 2008, 2009, 2014, 2020
- Softball, Girls – North Coast Section Champions, 2014
- Tennis, Boys –
- Track, Boys – NCS Redwood Empire Champions, 2006; Redwood Empire Division III Champions, 1971
- Water Polo, Boys – North Coast Section Champions, 1994, 2016
- Water Polo, Girls – North Coast Section Champions, 2018, 2019; NorCal Champions 2019

Three Tam teams have won NCS Scholastic Championships for the highest team Grade Point Average—the Girls Cross Country Team in 1991, with a GPA of 3.58, the Boys Swimming and Diving Team in 1998, with a 3.49 GPA, and the 2008 Softball team, which took first in the Class 2A Redwood Empire, at 3.46. In Spring 2008, the Boys Golf team took third in the NCS, with a 3.57 GPA.

Five Tam coaches have been recognized as Honor Coaches at the North Coast Section: Bruce Grant (girls track, 1982); Janis Villasenor Wood (girls track, 1985); Beth Juri (boys volleyball, 1997); and Don Smith (softball, 2003). Ed Chavez, long-time basketball coach at Tam, was named Honor Coach while coaching tennis at Branson after retiring from the Tam District.

==== Baseball ====
In 2009 Tam hired former Redwood High School pitcher Mike Terry to take over the program. After missing the playoffs in 2009 and 2010 the Hawks made it as the last seed and went out in the first round of the MCAL playoffs. In 2014 Scott Osder took over the program coming from Southern California. He brought Tamalpias High to its first NCS Championship in 85 years.

Future Major League pitcher Kenny Rosenberg pitched for the school baseball team, and was an All-MCAL First Team pitcher and first baseman in 2013, as well as an All-League goalkeeper in soccer. As a senior, on the mound Rosenberg had 75 strikeouts in 49 innings, with two shutouts.

==== Cross Country ====
Junior Dan Milechman won the 2009 State Division IV Championship, covering the 3.1-mile course in 15:37. Milechman was NCS Division IV Individual Champion in 2008 and 2009.

==== Football ====
Although Tam has never won a varsity football championship at the section level, which NCS held from 1919 to 1930 and from 1975 to present, the Fall 1966 Tamalpais Indians team set records at the league, state, and national levels. In its second year under coach Willie Hector, 1957 graduate of Tam and former NFL player, the 1966 Indians had a 4–1–1 record in the MCAL and 6–2–1 overall. After sophomore quarterback Donny Mackin broke his wrist in the opening league game, he was replaced by senior Steve Woodward, in his only season playing MCAL football. In his first game as starting quarterback, against Novato High School, Woodward set the state record for passing, at 546 yards (499 m), while split-end Mike Biber set the league record with 19 receptions. Woodward's passing record stood for 21 years, until a Southern California quarterback passed for 562 yards (514 m) in 1987. Tam's total offense of 821 yards (751 m) in the Novato game set the state record and was the second-highest ever recorded in the nation. Tam's state record only stood for one year, until tiny Happy Camp High School gained 912 yards (834 m) against the even smaller McCloud High School.

Fifty years later, following the 2016 season, Tam's big day ranked fifth in California and is tied for twelfth in the nation.

Since the current brackets were established in 2008, Tam's varsity football team has competed in Division III and has qualified for NCS playoffs seven times with the following results: lost 35–14 to Bishop O'Dowd High School in the first round in 2008; defeated El Cerrito High School 33–13 in their first round in 2009, and lost to Alhambra High School of Martinez in the second round 34–13; lost 40–21 to Encinal High School in the first round in 2011; lost 35–7 to Encinal High School in the first round in 2012; lost 64–8 in the first round in 2013 to the eventual Champion, El Cerrito High School; lost 50–6 in the first round in 2014 to the eventual runner-up, Marin Catholic High School; and lost 55–7 to Analy High School in the first round in 2016.

==== Soccer ====
In addition to the NCS championships won by the boys team in 2000 and the girls team in 2008. The boys team won MCALS in 2010, and proceeded to win NCS in 2012, beating 1st seeded Maria Carillo in the championship game. They finished the season with a record of 20–3–3.

==== Tennis ====
The 1999 boys varsity was the MCAL champion, finishing the season 14–0, the first undefeated season in the team's history. The boys varsity team also won the MCAL title in 2007 and 2011.

On October 23, 2008, the girls varsity tennis team won the 2008 MCAL championship for the first time in nine years, beating Marin Catholic 6–3 in the finals. The team was 16-6 for the season; it beat Redwood in the semifinals 5–4.

On November 15, 2008, Tam was upset by the Marin Catholic Wildcats 5–2 in the NCS Division II finals.

==== Track and field ====
Two Tam milers have taken first place in California State Track Meets. In 1936, Simon Scott won in 4:31.2; in 1976, the mile was won by Linda Broderick in 4:56.8.

==== Wrestling ====
Anne Campbell, North Coast Section Champion, 2004 and 2005, 2004 State Heavyweight Champion (non-CIF); Kelley Charlton, 2008 North Coast Section Champion, 2009 Northern California Regional Tournament Champion (154 lbs)

==== Club sports ====
The Tam High Mountain Bike Team is one of 35 high school teams in the NorCal High School Mountain Bike Racing League (non-CIF). Tam finished third in Division II in 2007 and 8th in 2008.

The Tam High Sailing Team, is a dinghy sailing team based out of the Sausalito Yacht Club. The team competes in the local NorCal regattas, the Bay's series regattas, and the P.C.C's (Pacific coast championships). The team sails CFJ's, C420's, and laser dinghy's.

=== Mock Trial ===
Tamalpais High School's Mock Trial team won the 2005 National High School Mock Trial Championship, held in Charlotte, North Carolina. Tam had defeated Redlands East Valley High School of San Bernardino County to win the state championship. In Charlotte, competing against 44 other schools, Tam won all five rounds of the tournament, beating the previously undefeated team from Kauai High School in the finals. The members of the national championship team were Sandra Allen, Mackenzie Amara, Jason Finkelstein, Jessie Kavanagh, Courtney Khademi, Natalie Robinson, Kelly Stout, and Max Wertheimer. Outstanding Performance Awards went to Allen as attorney, and Finkelstein and Stout as witnesses. Marin County defense attorney David M. Vogelstein, coach of the team since 1997, won the Advocate of the Year Award in 2005 from the Constitutional Rights Foundation.

Tam won the State championship again in 2009, and took second place in 1998 and 2007 and third place in 2008. As of 2014, the mock trial team has won the Marin County championship 19 years in a row.

On February 7, 2009, Tam won its fourteenth consecutive Marin County Championship, with captains IndiAna Gowland and Frank Alarcon winning as outstanding prosecution attorney. Tam went on to win its second State Championship on March 22, in Riverside, beating the 2007 champions, Elk Grove High School. At State, Junior Ben Harris won the best constitutional advocate award for his role as pre-trial defense lawyer. At the May 2009 National Mock Trial Competition in Atlanta, Georgia, Tam ranked 6th in the nation. Tam extended its streak to 15 Marin County Championships on February 6, 2010, advancing to the California Mock Trial Tournament, held March 19–21 in San Jose. Tam finished in sixth place, with Junior Amanda Weinberg receiving a Special Commendation as Outstanding Prosecution Witness. On February 5, 2011, Tam won its 16th consecutive Marin County mock trail championship. They competed in the California state finals in Riverside on March 25–27, securing a fourth-place finish. Sophomore Anna Lipman received a Special Commendation as Outstanding Defense Witness. On February 4, 2012, Tam won its 17th consecutive county title, besting Terra Linda High School—its championship round rival for five years running—by one point. The team will go on to the State Competition in Sacramento on March 23–25. The winning ways continued on February 2, 2013, when Tam High claimed its 18th consecutive Marin County Championship, this time with a victory over a team from Novato High School.

Vogelstein retired from his role as lead coach in 2018. He was honored by the Marin County Board of Education for 20 years of coaching the Mock Trial team. During his tenure, the team extended its winning steak for the county title to 23 consecutive years, and won three state championships and one national championship.

=== Performing arts ===
Tam High is the original home of the Conservatory Theatre Ensemble (CTE, formerly Ensemble Theater Company), formed by former student (Tam/Drake Class of 1952) and teacher Daniel Caldwell, notable alumni of which include Kathleen Quinlan, Tupac Shakur, Beth Behrs, Bridgit Mendler, and Courtney Thorne-Smith. ETC expanded its presence to include Redwood High School and Drake High School in the mid-1980s. The Daniel Caldwell Performing Arts Center a new facility features a new 10,000-square-foot (930 m^{2}) multi-use theatre building as well as significant upgrades and renovations to Ruby Scott Auditorium. The center was completed in 2006. The theatre is regionally known for its Fall & Spring One Act festival where students both act in and direct short plays. The program receives grants to host guest artists to direct and produce shows.

=== Global Studies ===
Tam High's Global Studies program has sent students to Orthez, France; Saint-Jean-de-Luz, France; Málaga, Spain; London; Pamplona, Spain; Cuba; Ireland, Italy, Vietnam, and Hungary. In 2000 the Tam News received a license from the Treasury Department to travel to Havana, Cuba and produced their first color magazine issue. The following year, 2001, musicians, artists, and dancers from the school visited Havana's art high schools and spent time creating art together with the Cuban students. In 2013, the baseball and softball teams received permission to travel to Havana, Cuba to each play a three-game series against Cuban teams. Throughout the trip, the teams traveled the country and experienced many unique cultural opportunities including Festival Internacional del Cine Pobre. The boys finished with a 2–1 record and the girls swept with a 3–0 record.

=== Student publications ===
The school's newspaper, the Tamalpais News has won awards from the National Scholastic Press Association and the Columbia Scholastic Press Association. News staff won individual awards for Story of the Year from the NSPA in 1998 (2nd for features); 2009 (3rd Diversity); 2011 (5th News Story); 2013 (2nd Feature, 4th Diversity); and 2014 (1st Editorial/Opinion, 2nd Feature). The 2014 First place was awarded to the Staff for "All Quiet on the District Front"; the Second place was won by Isaac Cohen for "Undocumented: Navigating Life Without Citizenship." The paper introduced a website in 2006, tamnews.org, which was a finalist for the NSPA Online Pacemaker in 2007 and 2014.

In 2006, for the first time since the award was established in 1983, CSPA presented the News one of 37 Silver Crown Awards.

Tam News staff won ten individual and staff Gold Circle Awards and Certificates of Merit from the CSPA in 2001, with 17 total since 1984. In 2014, CPSA recognized four members of the News, with Cassie Jeong winning two awards for Hand-drawn Art/Illustration: 1st place for "Startup Weekend Adventures" and 3rd for "Zine Fest." The Staff received the 3rd-place award in Editorial writing for "All Quiet on the District Front"; Isaac Cohen received a Certificate of Merit in the In-depth news/feature story category for "Undocumented." Previous Gold Circle Award winners follow:

- 1997 Single Spot News Photograph (Tabloid), 2nd, Shannon McGuire, "Mill Valley fire fighters..."
- 2000 Entertainment Review, 2nd, Noah Flower, "Powerful novel reveals African experience"
- 2001 Feature Photo (Single), 2nd, Sarah Wagner, "Bring Elian Home-Salremos A Alian"

Overall Design, 2nd, Sarah Wagner, Noah Flower, And the staff, "Tam News From Havana"
Title & Content Page, 2nd, Noah Flower, Sarah Wagner, "Inside"
Personality Profile, 3rd, Melissa Simon, "Into The Unknown"

The News has experimented with different formats, including a news magazine called THAT Magazine from 2003 to 2005. The staff adviser since 2006, Jonah Steinhart, was a partner in two Silicon Valley startups and was Editor-in-Chief of the Campanile when he was at Palo Alto High School.

== Sexual abuse scandal ==
In 2019, former tennis coach Normandie Burgos was convicted on 60 counts of child molestation, including forcible sodomy and lewd conduct upon minors, after a victim recorded him admitting to sexual acts with minors.The specific accusations against him included inappropriate touching of students during body fat tests, giving unsolicited and inappropriate massages, and sexually assaulting students in his office and the school's locker room. He is currently serving a 255-year prison sentence. His conviction followed a mistrial in 2010 due to a deadlocked jury.

In 2024, a Marin County jury found the Tamalpais Union High School District liable for failing to protect students from Burgos, leading to a settlement of $17.5 million to four former students who alleged abuse during their time at the school. The settlement included $11.5 million awarded to Alexander Harrison, who reported the abuse in 2006. His experience, along with those of other victims, highlighted systemic failures within the school district, where administrators allegedly ignored clear signs of misconduct. One victim testified that an administrator witnessed an assault but chose to make a joke instead of intervening.

== Awards and recognition ==
Tamalpais High School was a recipient of the California Distinguished School Award in 1999, 2005, and 2009. The school has been ranked in the top five percent of American high schools since 2005, based on a system devised by Dave Matthews of The Washington Post and reported by Newsweek. Tam ranked the highest of all Marin County high schools each year, at 428 in 2005, 425 in 2006, 410 in 2007, and 979 in 2008.

== Notable alumni and students ==
As part of its celebration of its 144th year, the San Francisco Chronicle ran a series in June 2009 listing 144 famous Bay Area high school alumni in a "roll call of fame". Tam alumni listed included Tupac Shakur, George Duke, Pat Paulsen, William L. Patterson, John Cipollina, and Courtney Thorne-Smith.

The people listed here graduated from or attended Tam. The year shown is the year of graduation for the class that they entered with, unless they are known to have graduated with or identify with a different class.

- William L. Patterson 1911 – attorney; civil rights pioneer
- Roger Kent c. 1923‡ – attorney; general counsel, U.S. Department of Defense, 1952–53; Democratic Party campaign manager and State chair
- Eve Arden (Eunice Quedens) 1926* – Oscar-nominated actress, Mildred Pierce, Anatomy of a Murder, Grease, star of TV series Our Miss Brooks
- Freddy Nagel 1926* – saxophonist, big band leader
- Antonio "Tony" Freitas c. 1926 – pitcher MLB, Philadelphia Athletics and Cincinnati Reds, member of Pacific Coast League Hall of Fame
- Larry Lansburgh, 1929 - director and documentarian
- Sam Chapman 1934‡ – athlete (high school and college star, California Golden Bears; MLB's Philadelphia Athletics and Cleveland Indians)
- Art Schallock 1943 – MLB pitcher: Yankees (1953 World Series), Orioles
- Pat Paulsen 1945† – statesman, actor, comedian (Smothers Brothers Comedy Hour)
- Joe DeMaestri 1946‡ – MLB shortstop: A's, St. Louis Browns, Chicago White Sox, Yankees, 1957 All Star, 1960 World Series
- Anton Szandor LaVey (Howard Stanton Levey) ~1947 – founder of Church of Satan
- Karl Olson 1948* – MLB outfielder: Red Sox, Senators, Tigers
- Willard G. Oxtoby 1950 – American theologian; founding director of the Graduate Centre for Religious Studies, University of Toronto.
- Matt Hazeltine 1951† – athlete (linebacker, NFL San Francisco 49ers, 1963 and 1965 Pro Bowls)
- Daniel Caldwell 1952‡ – actor; drama teacher (Daniel Caldwell Performing Arts Center opened in 2006 at Tam High)
- Pete Gross 1954* – radio sports announcer; "Voice of the Seahawks"
- John L. Wasserman 1955† – entertainment critic and columnist with San Francisco Chronicle from 1964 until his death in 1979; he referred to "the Frats and the Hoods" at Tam in his review of Grease
- Willie Hector 1957 – football player
- Rob Nilsson 1957‡ – actor and director, 9 @ Night Films (On the Edge; first American director to win both the Prix de la Caméra d'Or (Best First Film) at Cannes (for Northern Lights in 1979) and the Grand Jury Prize-Dramatic at the Sundance Film Festival (in 1988 for Heat and Sunlight))
- Hans Halberstadt 1961 – author (including Under Cover, War Stories of the Green Berets, Trigger Men, Roughneck Nine One, Inside the Navy SEALs)
- Sally Champlin 1962 – actress and singer
- Elmer Collett 1962‡ – athlete (lineman, NFL San Francisco 49ers, Baltimore Colts)
- John A. Meacham 1962 – professor
- George Duke 1963 – jazz pianist
- Charlie Kelly 1963‡ – roadie (Sons of Champlin); Mountain Bike Hall of Fame
- John Cipollina 1964* – musician (Quicksilver Messenger Service)
- Bill Champlin 1965* – musician (Sons of Champlin, Chicago)
- Honor Jackson 1966‡ – athlete (University of the Pacific, NFL)
- Charlie Cunningham 1967* – mountain bike pioneer (Mountain Bike Hall of Fame first year inductee, 1988)
- Michael Goldberg 1971‡ – writer (Rolling Stone, Addicted to Noise)
- Tom Killion 1971‡ – artist, author, African historian and educator
- Joe Breeze 1972‡ – mountain bike inventor (Mountain Bike Hall of Fame 1988, founder of Breezer Bikes)
- Mario Cipollina 1972* – musician (Huey Lewis and the News)
- Kathleen Quinlan 1972‡ – Oscar-nominated actress (American Graffiti, Apollo 13, The Doors, Breach)
- Merritt Butrick 1977* – actor (Square Pegs, Star Trek II: The Wrath of Khan)
- Peter Shor 1977‡ – mathematician
- Signy Coleman 1978‡ – model, actress (The Young and the Restless, Guiding Light)
- Ann Killion 1979 – award-winning sportswriter and New York Times best-selling author; columnist for San Francisco Chronicle
- Bryan Price 1980‡ – pitcher drafted by (California Angels), MLB pitching coach (Seattle Mariners, Arizona Diamondbacks), manager (Cincinnati Reds)
- Adam Steltzner 1981‡ – NASA engineer at JPL; phase lead and development manager for EDL (Entry, Descent and Landing) of Curiosity rover lander, which successfully landed on Mars on August 5, 2012
- Montgomery McFate 1984 – anthropologist, defense analyst
- Cintra Wilson 1984 – writer
- Courtney Thorne-Smith 1985* – actress (Melrose Place, Ally McBeal, According to Jim)
- Vince Chhabria 1987* – United States District Judge
- Chris Chaney 1988* – musician (Jane's Addiction, The Panic Channel)
- Romeo Bandison 1989* – NFL (Cleveland Browns; Washington Redskins); NCAA football coach (Colorado Buffaloes)
- Tupac Shakur 1989† – rapper, actor
- Snatam Kaur c. 1990 – musician
- Nyjer Morgan c. 1997 – MLB outfielder (Pittsburgh Pirates, Washington Nationals, Milwaukee Brewers)
- Sarah Austin (journalist) 2004 – Manhattan-based Internet personality, founder of Pop17
- Beth Behrs 2004 – actress (2 Broke Girls, American Pie Presents: The Book of Love, The Neighborhood)
- Monica Barbaro 2007 - actress
- Finnegan Lee Elder and Gabriel Christian Natale-Hjorth, convicted murderers (2019 murder of police officer Mario Cerciello Rega)
- Kenny Rosenberg c. 2013 – Major League Baseball pitcher for the Los Angeles Angels
- Salem Ilese 2017 – singer
- Yuna McCormack 2023 - soccer player

* Alumni listed in the 2002 Alumni Directory, address unconfirmed
† Alumni listed as "reported deceased" in the 2002 Alumni Directory
‡ Alumni listed in the Biographical Section of the 2002 Alumni Directory

== Notable faculty, coaches, and advisors ==
- Roy "Wrongway" Riegels coached the Tamalpais High School football team in 1934 and recruited Sam Chapman to play for UC Berkeley
- Dan Caldwell, founder, Ensemble Theatre Company
- Willie Hector, American football player
- Dave Meggyesy, former NFL linebacker and author of Out of Their League, was the head football coach in 1981 while teaching part-time at Stanford

== Tam High in popular culture ==
- The Tamalpais Marching Band appeared in the 1969 Woody Allen film Take the Money and Run, while Tam teachers Dan Caldwell and Don Michaelian had small roles as a prison guard and a prisoner
- David Crosby's song, "Tamalpais High (At About 3)", refers to when Tam classes end for the day, and was conceived while the musician passed the school on the way to recording sessions in neighboring Sausalito, reportedly at The Plant Studios. It was recorded in February 1971 (though The Plant Studios is said to have opened in 1972). David Crosby – guitar, vocals; Jerry Garcia – guitar; Jorma Kaukonen – guitar; Phil Lesh – bass; Bill Kreutzmann – drums
- The cover photograph for the 1986 album Fore! by Huey Lewis and the News was taken at Tam High. Three members of the band - Bill Gibson, Sean Hopper, and Mario Cipollina - had previously attended the school
- A Time for Dancing, (Davida Wills Hurwin, 1995, Little Brown & Co, ISBN 0-316-38351-1) is set partly in Mill Valley and at Tam, which Julianna and Samantha, the main characters, attend; the movie based on the book was shot in 2000, with limited distribution in Europe, and was released in the United States in 2004
