= Suwanosejima =

Island within the Ryukyu Islands

Native name: Japanese: 諏訪之瀬島
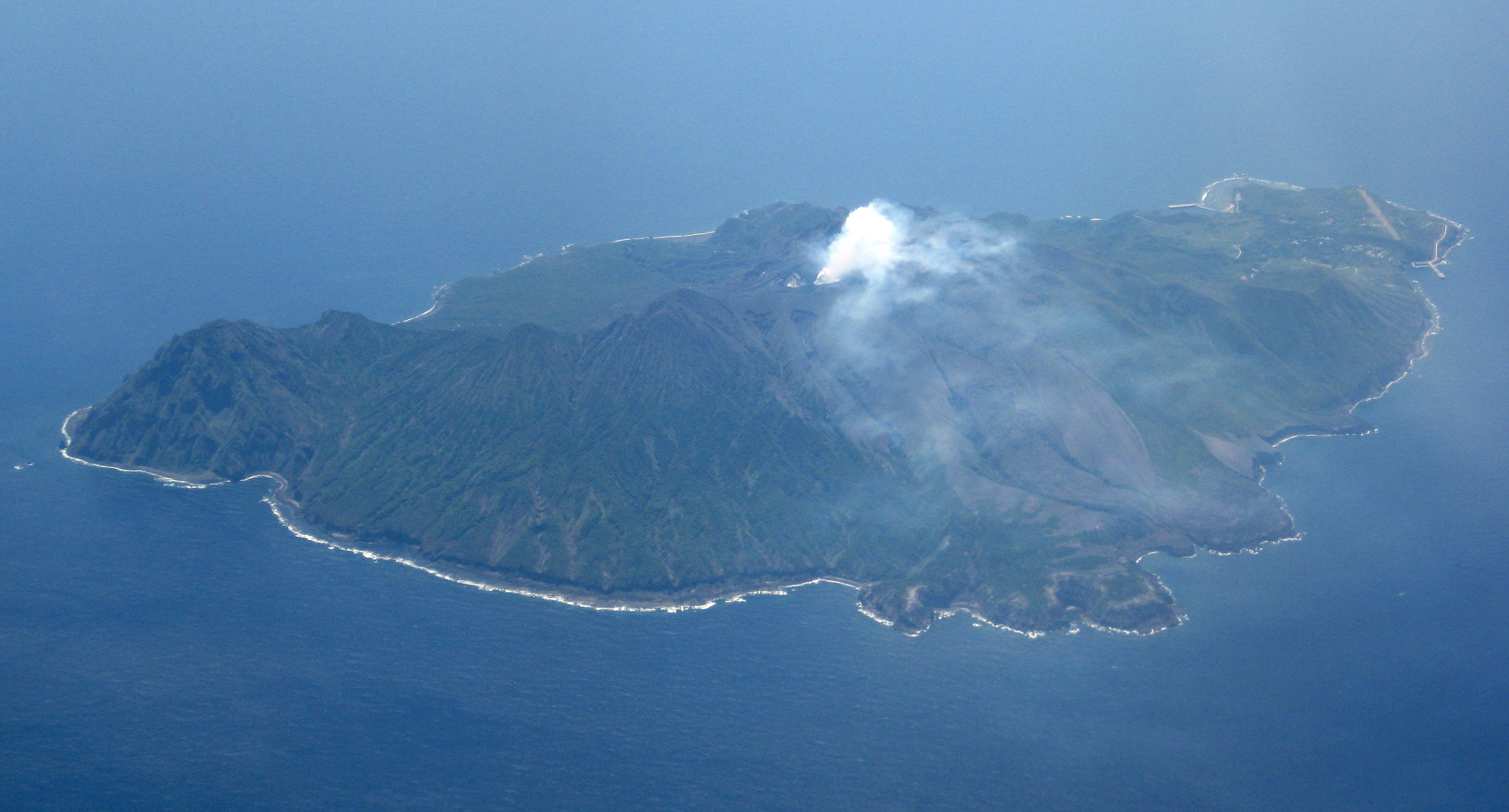

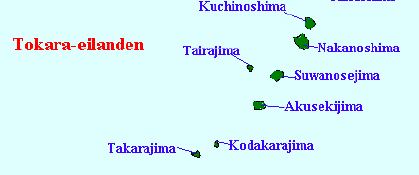

Geography
- Location: East China Sea
- Coordinates: 29°38′N 129°43′E
- Archipelago: Tokara Islands
- Area: 27.66 km^{2} (10.68 sq mi)
- Coastline: 27.15 km (16.87 mi)
- Highest elevation: 796 m (2612 ft)
- Highest point: Otake

Administration
- Japan
- Kagoshima Prefecture

Demographics
- Population: 84 (2025)
- Pop. density: 3.03/km^{2} (7.85/sq mi)
- Ethnic groups: Ryukyuan, Japanese

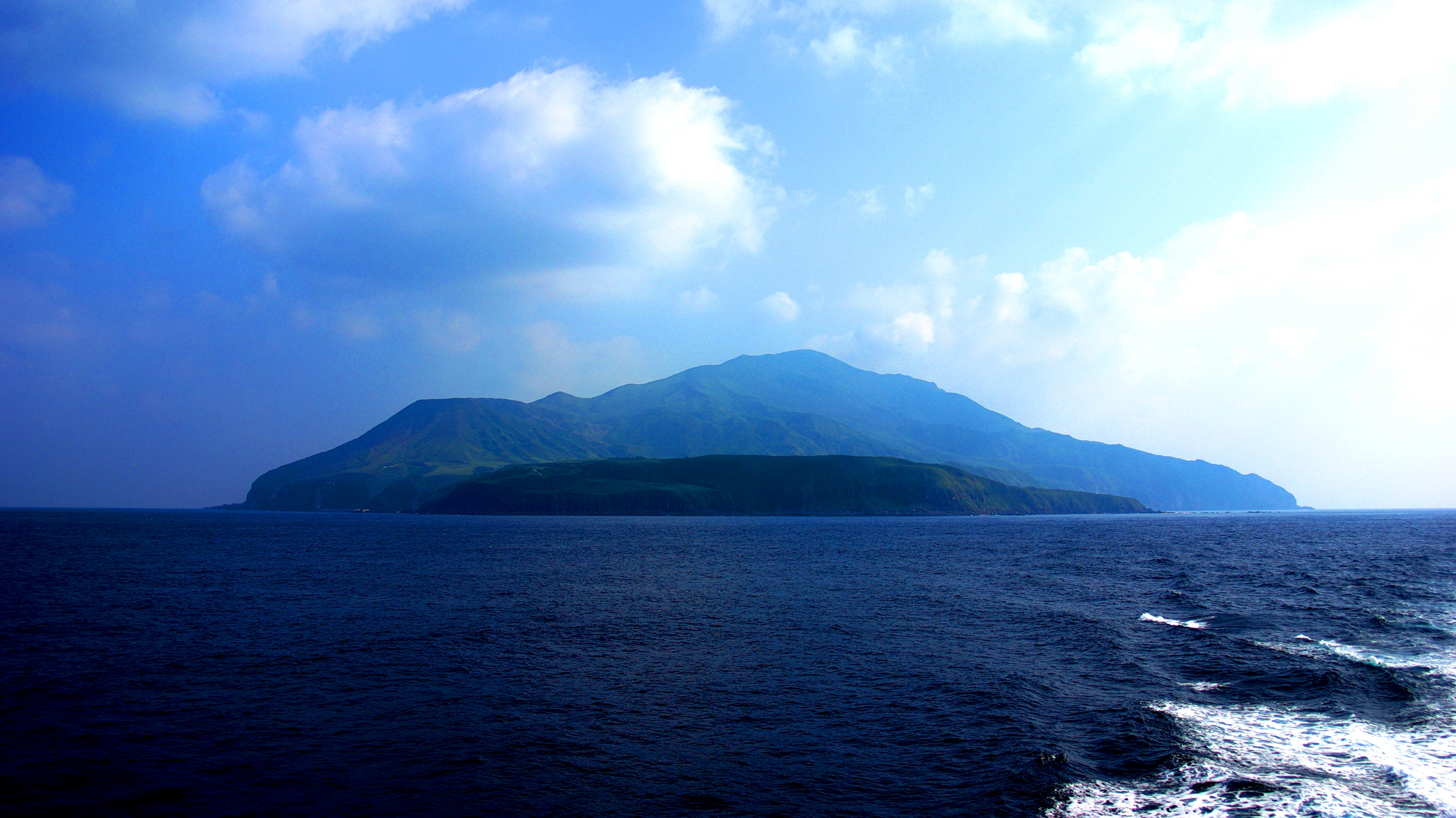
Overall view of Suwanosejima. May, 2007.

Suwanose Jima (諏訪之瀬島) is one of the Tokara Islands, belonging to Kagoshima Prefecture. The island covers 27.66 km² in area and has a population of 84 people. Although the island has an airport, there are no regularly scheduled services, and access is normally by ferry to the city of Kagoshima on the mainland. The island is about nine hours by boat from the mainland. The islanders are dependent mainly on agriculture, fishing and seasonal tourism.

== Geography ==
Suwanosejima is the second largest of the islands in the Tokara archipelago, and is located 21 kilometres (11 nmi) southwest from Nakanoshima. The highest elevation is Otake (御岳), with a height of 796 metres (2,612 ft) above sea level, which is the exposed cone of an active stratovolcano arising from the ocean floor.

The local climate is classified as subtropical, with a rainy season from May through September.

== History ==
Suwanosejima has been populated sporadically (depending on volcanic activity), for several thousand years. The island was once part of the Ryukyu Kingdom. During the Edo period, Suwanosejima was part of Satsuma Domain and was administered as part of Kawanabe District.

In 1896, the island was transferred to the administrative control of Ōshima District, Kagoshima, and from 1911 was administered as part of the village of Toshima, Kagoshima. From 1946-1952, the island was administered by the United States as part of the Provisional Government of Northern Ryukyu Islands.

It is the home of Buzoku, also called the Banyan Ashram, a commune founded in the 1960s by Sansei Yamao, Nanao Sakaki, and others, and home for a while to American poet and scholar Gary Snyder.

== Eruptions ==
Suwanosejima was abandoned after a great 15th century eruption, until it was resettled by people of the Amami Islands in the 19th century. After large-scale Plinian eruptions from 1813-1814, which ejected a large amount of scoria and saw lava flows to the west coast, the island was abandoned by its inhabitants again until 1883. Further eruptions occurred in 1877, 1914-1915, 1921, 1922-1925, 1938, 1940, 1949, 1950-1954, 1957-1999, 2001-2002 and 2004-present. One of the most active volcanic islands in the world, Suwanosejima recorded 156 volcanic eruptions in 2008 and 216 in 2009. Since October 2004, eruptions have been continuous.

On 14 January 2024, when Mount Otake erupted, expelling rocks more than a kilometer from its crater.

Explosive activity was reported on 27 September 2025. The Volcanic Ash Advisory Center (VAAC) in Tokyo reported an ash plume rose up to 9,000 feet moving southeast at 5 kts.

== See also ==
- List of volcanoes in Japan

== Bibliography ==
- National Geospatial Intelligence Agency (NGIA). Prostar Sailing Directions 2005 Japan Enroute. Prostar Publications (2005). ISBN 1577856511
- Das, Bhagavan (1997). It's Here Now (Are You?) Broadway. ISBN 0-7679-0008-1
- Halper, Jon, ed. Gary Snyder: Dimensions of a Life (1991) Sierra Club Books. ISBN 0-87156-616-8
- Shurtleff, William and Aoyagi, Akiko (1998). The Book of Tofu. ISBN 978-1-58008-013-2
- Snyder, Gary. The Gary Snyder Reader (1999) Counterpoint. ISBN 978-1-887178-90-7
