= Sansei Yamao =

Japanese poet (1938–2001)

Sansei Yamao (山尾 三省, Yamao Sansei; 1938 – 28 August 2001) was a Japanese poet.

Sansei Yamo was born in Tokyo in 1938. He studied western philosophy at Waseda University, but dropped out before graduation. In the latter half of the 1960s, he and his companions Nanao Sakaki and Tetsuo Nagasawa started a commune called Buzoku (English: tribe), with an aim to change society. In 1973, he went on a pilgrimage to India and Nepal with his family for a year. Upon returning to Japan, he moved with his family in 1977 to a ghost village on Yaku-Shima, an island located in the south of Japan, famous for the Japanese Joumon cedar, which lives for several thousand years. He began to build a village at Shirakawa mountain. He wrote poetry and prose, and farmed his field there until his death. He visited his old friend poet Gary Snyder in the spring of 1997 at Snyder's house in the Sierra Nevada. In 1966 Sansei Yamao had initially met Snyder, who travelled to Japan to receive his first Zen training in Kyoto. At that time, Sansei Yamao and Gary Snyder traversed the Ominesan mountain range in Nara, which is known as the Shugendō mountain, together for a week. After Snyder went back to the United States, while Sansei went to India and then subsequently moved to Yaku-Shima, the two had not been in contact with each other. Therefore, when Sansei Yamao met Gary Snyder again in 1997, he was surprised to learn that Snyder's recent emphasis was bioregionalism, because he, too, had been thinking about very similar things for 20 years. He said, "The earth is just a region, a region is just the earth." The year following their second meeting, "聖なる地球のつどいかな" (Seinaru chikyu no tudoi kana) was published in Japan (ed. 山里勝己 Katsunori Yamazato, 山と渓谷社 Yama to keikokusha, 1998), a collection of their dialogues held in the Sierra Nevada.

Sansei Yamao died on 28 August 2001 at his home on the island of Yakushima.

== Selected bibliography ==
- Seirojin (1981)
- No no michi - essays about Kenji Miyazawa (1983)
- Jomonsugi no kokage nite (1985)
- Birobaboshi no shita de (1993)
- Seinaru chikyu no tudoi kana (1998), collection of dialogues with Gary Snyder
- Koko de kurasu tanoshimi (1999), collection of essays
- Animism to iu kibo (2000), 5 days of lectures at the University of the Ryukyus
- Kami o yonda Issa no haiku - kibo to shite no animizumu (2000)
- Minami no hikari no naka de (2002)
- Inori / prayer (2002)
- Sansei Yamao Poetry Works (translated into English)

"Make the fire," "Mitto-kun and a cloud," "A Moonlit Night," "Dawn Cafe Au Leit," "At the Mountain," "Sea," "Wind"

"Index page", happano.org

SINGLE BLISS: Yamao Sansei Translations by Scott Watson. Gardnerville, NV. Country Valley Press. 2007.

"After Rain." Translated by Scott Watson. Atlanta, GA. Atlanta Review. Spring/Summer 2002, p. 52.

"An Island of Life." Yamao Sansei translations by Scott Watson. Sendai, Japan. The Tohoku Gakuin University Review, No.139. November 2004, pp. 91 ~ 112.
