= Turtle Island (book) =

1974 book by Gary Snyder

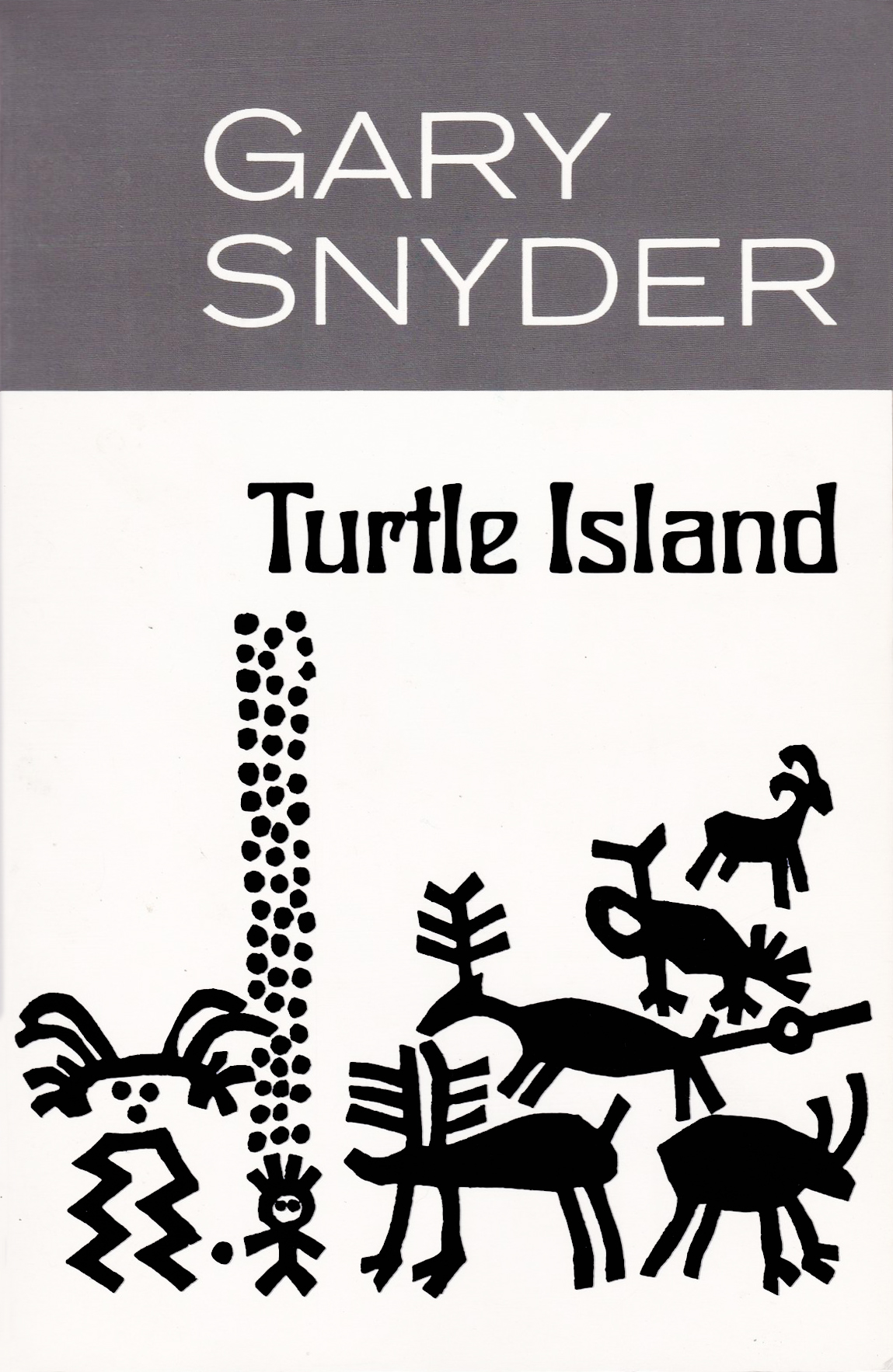
- First edition
- Author: Gary Snyder
- Language: English
- Publisher: New Directions
- Publication date: 1974
- Publication place: United States
- Pages: 114
- Awards: Pulitzer Prize for Poetry (1975)
- ISBN: 0-8112-0545-2

Turtle Island is a book of poems and essays written by Gary Snyder and published by New Directions in 1974. The writings express Snyder's vision for humans to live in harmony with the earth and all its creatures. The book was awarded the Pulitzer Prize for Poetry in 1975. "Turtle Island" is a name for the continent of North America used by many Native American tribes.

== Background ==
By the late 1950s, Snyder had established himself as one of the major American poets of his generation. He was associated with both the Beat Generation and the regional San Francisco Renaissance. He spent much of the 1960s traveling between California and Japan, where he studied Zen. In 1966, he met Masa Uehara while in Osaka. They married the following year and had their first child, Kai, in April 1968; by December, Snyder and his new family moved to California. His return coincided with the highest crest of 1960s counterculture, as well as the nascent environmental movement. He was received as an elder statesman by both the hippies and the environmentalists, and he became a public intellectual who gave public lectures, making television appearances, and publishing new writing.

Many of the poems and essays in the book had been previously published. The essay "Four Changes" first appeared in The Environmental Handbook, a collection published by David Brower and Friends of the Earth for the first Earth Day in 1970. "Four Changes" was initially published anonymously with no copyright notice, and consequently it was widely reproduced. One of the poems, "The Hudsonian Curlew", was first published in the November 1969 issue of Poetry magazine. Some of the poems were published in 1972 as a limited-edition collection titled Manzanita.

Many of the poems in Turtle Island are political in nature, like much of Snyder's poetry of the late 1960s, albeit with a different focus than that of his earlier writings. With American military involvement in the Vietnam War coming to a close, Snyder's attention had turned from matters of war and peace to environmental and ecological concerns. In 1973 several of Snyder's friends, interested in his new direction, gathered in Berkeley, California to hear him read his new work. At the reading, Snyder asked whether these political poems could "succeed as poetry"; his friends "reportedly refused to pass judgment" on the question. Later, the poet's UC Davis colleague Jack Hicks related words from a female graduate student who took one of Snyder's classes in the late 1980s: "there are two kinds of political poetry: Suckers—rare—seduce you to the point. Whackers assault you with the message. ... I cited Turtle Island as a blatant whacker, and Gary defended it strongly. But first he listened."

== Contents ==
Turtle Island is split into four sections. The first three—Manzanita, Magpie's Song, and For the Children—include a total of almost 60 poems, while the fourth section, Plain Talk, includes five prose essays. The collection includes many of Snyder's most commonly quoted and anthologized poems. There is also an introduction, in which Snyder explains the significance of the book's title.

Section title	Contents
Manzanita	"Anasazi"; "The Way West, Underground"; "The Dead by the Side of the Road"; "I Went into the Maverick Bar"; "Steak"; "No Matter, Never Mind"; "The Bath"; "Coyote Valley Spring"; "Spel Against Demons"; "Front Lines"; "Control Burn"; "The Great Mother"; "The Call of the Wild"; "Prayer for the Great Family"; "Source"; "Manzanita"; "Charms"
Magpie's Song	"Facts"; "The Real Work"; "Pine Tree Tops"; "For Nothing"; "Night Herons"; "The Egg"; "The Uses of Light"; "On San Gabriel Ridges"; "By Frazier Creek Falls"; "Black Mesa Mine #1"; "Up Branches of Duck River"; "It Pleases"; "Hemp"; "The Wild Mushroom"; "Mother Earth: Her Whales"; "Affluence"; "Ethnobotany"; "Straight Creek—Great Burn"; "The Hudsonian Curlew"; "Two Fawns That Didn't See the Light This Spring"; "Two Immortals"; "Rain in Alleghany"; "Avocado"; "What Steps"; "Why Log Truck Drivers Rise Earlier Than Students of Zen"; "Bedrock"; "The Dazzle"; "'One Should Not Talk to a Skilled Hunter About What is Forbidden by the Buddha'"; "L M F B R"; "Walking Home from 'The Duchess of Malfi'"; "Magpie's Song"
For the Children	"O Waters"; "Gen"; "Dusty Braces"; "The Jemez Pueblo Rising"; "Tomorrow's Song"; "What Happened Here Before"; "Toward Climax"; "For the Children"; "As for Poets"
Plain Talk	"Four Changes"; "'Energy is Eternal Delight'"; "The Wilderness"; "What's Meant by 'Here'"; "On 'As for Poets'"

== Reception ==
In his review of Turtle Island in Poetry magazine, critic Richard Howard commented that the book describes "where we are and where he wants us to be," although the difference between those two is "so vast that the largely good-humored resonance of the poems attests to Snyder's forbearance, his enforced detachment." He praised the book's poems for their meditative quality and their lack of preachiness or invective. He described the poems as "transitory, elliptical, extraterritorial" works, in which "the world becomes largely a matter of contours and traces to be guessed at, marveled over, left alone."

In Library Journal, James McKenzie wrote:

In precise, disciplined, unromantic language and form (at its best resembling Pound's), Snyder's poems pare cleanly through the thick crust of late 20th-Century urban mass life, revealing its essentially incidental nature, connecting us with the creeks, mountains, birds, and bears of "North America" that were here long before it had that name and, nature prevailing, will be here after that name is lost, forgotten, destroyed.

Writing for the Christian Science Monitor, Victor Howes praised the book's "gentle, uncomplicated love-lyrics to planet earth" and said it would be equally appealing to poetry readers and to conservationists. Herbert Leibowitz, writing for the New York Times Book Review, was less enthusiastic. While Leibowitz found merit in a select few poems and praised Snyder's prose as "vigorous and persuasive", he found the collection "flat, humorless ... uneventful ... [and] oddly egotistical". In his view, it was "a textbook example of the limits of Imagism." Still, the critic said he was "reluctant to mention these doubts" because he found Snyder's fundamental environmentalist message to be so laudatory, even "on the side of the gods."

The printing of the first American edition was limited to 2,000 copies. As of 2005, the book had been reprinted roughly once a year in the United States, placing it among a handful of Snyder's books that have never gone out-of-print. It has sold more than 100,000 copies. The book has been translated into Swedish (by Reidar Ekner in 1974), French (by Brice Matthieussent in 1977), Japanese (by Nanao Sakaki in 1978), and German (by Ronald Steckel in 1980).

=== Pulitzer Prize ===
Snyder received the Pulitzer Prize for Poetry for Turtle Island in May 1975. Because of Snyder's remoteness at Kitkitdizze, news of the award took some time to reach him. It was the first time a Pulitzer had been given to a poet from the West Coast. The prestigious award helped to legitimize Snyder's idiosyncratic worldview in the intellectual mainstream.

Along with the award itself, Snyder received a check for $1,000 (equivalent to $5,983 in 2025). According to his friend Steve Sanfield, Snyder quietly donated the money to a local volunteer organization that was building a new school in the San Juan Ridge area. Snyder maintained that the best perk of winning the Pulitzer Prize was that people no longer introduced him as "a Beat poet".
