= Eli Boggs =

American pirate

Eli Boggs (fl. mid 19th century) was an American pirate, one of the last active ocean-going pirates operating off the coast of China during the 1850s. Based near Hong Kong, Boggs constantly raided outgoing clipper ships carrying highly valuable cargo of opium throughout the decade. He is most particularly known for his cruelty, as in one recorded incident he had the body of a captured Chinese merchant cut into small pieces and had them delivered to shore in small buckets as a warning against interference in his criminal activities. In 1857, after a violent and bloody siege, Boggs was forced to swim ashore after his junk was destroyed by rival pirates. However, after holding his captors at bay with a knife, Boggs was finally apprehended and imprisoned in a Hong Kong jail for three years, eventually being tried for murder before his deportation to the United States in 1857. The closing statement he made at his trial resounded with George Wingrove Cooke and triggered an investigation into one of Hong Kong's earliest political scandals: the collaboration between government's Daniel Caldwell and pirate Ma Chow Wong.

He was executed by hanging in 1861.
