= Tom Killion (artist) =

American fine artist, printmaker, African historian and author

- Born: 1953 (age 72–73); Mill Valley, California, U.S.
- Education: University of California, Santa Cruz; Stanford University
- Known for: Fine Art, Printmaking
- Website: https://tomkillion.com/

Tom Killion (born 1953) is an American artist, author, African historian and educator. He is internationally known for printmaking linocut, woodcut and letterpress techniques. The subject matter of his artwork is often the landscapes of Northern California. His art studio is in Inverness Ridge, on the Point Reyes Peninsula in Marin County, California. Three of his books were co-authored by the Pulitzer Prize-winning Beat poet Gary Snyder. Killion has taught African history classes at Bowdoin College, University of Asmara and San Francisco State University.

== Biography ==
Killion was born in 1953 in Mill Valley, California, and has two siblings, a brother Paul and a sister, journalist Ann Killion. He attended Tamalpais High School. Killion graduated from University of California, Santa Cruz in 1975 from Cowell College in History. He has a Master of Arts degree from 1980 and a Doctorate degree from 1985, from Stanford University in African History, with his dissertation on the Ethiopian/Eritrean labor movement. From 1990 to 1995, Killion taught African History at Bowdoin College. Between 1993 and 1994 he was a Fulbright Professor at University of Asmara in Eritrea. And in 1995 to 2001 he was a guest lecturer at San Francisco State University (SFSU) in the Humanities Department.

While attending University of California, Santa Cruz, Killion learned printmaking and bookbinding from Jack Stauffacher in 1975. In the same year 1975, he created his first printed book of landscapes, 28 Views of Mount Tamalpais. By 1977 he founded his own Quail Press. His printmaking is inspired by Japanese woodblock printing but it is different in technique, because he uses oil-based inks, linoleum block and a printing press.

Killion was featured on the PBS television series Craft in America, episode "Process" airing October 7, 2009, also featuring 92nd Street Y, Kansas City Art Institute, North Bennet Street School, Julie Chen and others.

== Awards ==
- 2017 – Marin Cultural Treasure Award, Cultural Commission of Marin County, California
- 2016 – Commonwealth Club’s 85th Annual, California Book Awards for California’s Wild Edge
- 2016 – 35th Annual Northern California Book Reviewers, Recognition Award for California’s Wild Edge

== Bibliography ==
- California's Wild Edge co-authored with Gary Snyder. Heyday Books, 2015. ISBN 978-1597142991
- Tamalpais Walking: Poetry, History, and Prints co-authored with Gary Snyder. Heyday Books, 2013. ISBN 978-1597142595
- The High Sierra of California co-authored with Gary Snyder. Heyday Books, 2005. ISBN 978-1890771997
- The Coast of California. Quail Press, 1999. ISBN 978-0966616705
- Historical Dictionary of Eritrea. co-authored with Dan Connell, Scarecrow Press, 1998. ISBN 9780810875050
- The California Coast. David R Godine Publisher, 1988. ISBN 978-0879237677
- Fortress Marin. Presidio Press, 1979. ISBN 978-0891410836
