= The Tribe (Buzoku) =

The Tribe was the best known name of a loose-knit countercultural group in Japan in the 1960s and 1970s. It is reported to have begun in the vicinity of Shinjuku, and leadership included Nanao Sakaki, Tetsuo Nagasawa, Sansei Yamao, Mamoru Kato, and Kenji Akiba. Members espoused an interest in an alternative community, and rejected materialism.

== Membership ==
The organization which would later become known as "The Tribe" initially called itself "the Bum Academy", or sometimes Harijan. During their early years, this group published three issues of a magazine, called Psyche, which attracted some attention. It was some time after the group obtained land in Nagano Prefecture and on Suwanosejima, that "the Tribe" (Buzoku) became their common alias. Starting in December 1967, they published a newspaper, also called Buzoku. By 1970, according to Yamao, a few thousand people felt some varying degrees of belonging to the Tribe, although the majority of the group's membership at this time was likely younger. American poet and scholar Gary Snyder was also an influential member of the Tribe, and Bhagavan Das spent some time with the Tribe on Suwanosejima in 1971–2.

== Ashram ==
A group member known as Sakaki found available land on Suwanosejima and brought several friends there, from the highland farm they had already started in Nagano in May 1967. This was the beginning of the "Banyan Ashram". In 2004, according to Sakaki, some ten families were still living at this commune.

== Bibliography ==
- Das, Bhagavan (1997). It's Here Now (Are You?) Broadway. ISBN 0-7679-0008-1
- Halper, Jon, ed. Gary Snyder: Dimensions of a Life (1991) Sierra Club Books. ISBN 0-87156-616-8
- Snyder, Gary. The Gary Snyder Reader (1999) Counterpoint. ISBN 1-887178-90-2
