= Dooby Lane =

Coordinates: 40°40′43.1″N 119°21′40.3″W

Dooby Lane is a folk art installation located near Gerlach, Nevada in the Black Rock Desert. Dooby Lane consists of a series of art installations that include aphorisms and the names of local residents carved in to stones. Larger installations such as "Ground Zero", Elvis, Imagination Station – Desert Broadcasting System (where the windows are TV frames with different panoramas) are also present.

Dooby (or Doobie) Lane, also known as Guru Road, was created by DeWayne "Doobie" Williams between 1978 and 1992. Williams was born in 1918 on a ranch 25 miles north of Gerlach. In his early youth, Willams' family moved to Gerlach. Williams left Gerlach at age 21, joining the Marines and serving in the South Pacific. Williams returned to Gerlach in 1972.

Romesburg states that Dooby Lane started when Williams, while walking his dog, noticed some petroglyphs and decide to create his own, consisting of his name and a saying. Goin states that Williams was inspired by the petroglyph made by George Jaquith in 1852 at High Rock Canyon. Over the years, Williams added more sayings, much like the Burma-Shave billboards. Williams regularly smoked cannabis, earning the nickname Doobie. He shortened his nickname to "Dooby" after he found it easier to inscribe into stones.

Pulitzer Prize-winning poet Gary Snyder first visited Dooby Lane in 1988. In 1990, there were 50 stone structures and 450 stone engravings. In 1995, Williams died of cancer. In 1996 the book Dooby Lane: A Testament Inscribed in Stone Tablets was released. The book consists of text by Snyder with photographs by University of Nevada, Reno students and professor Peter Goin. In May 1996 advanced photography students camped north of Leadville (37 miles from Gerlach) while photographing the installation. The 50-edition accordion fold book was designed by John Balkwill and created by the students with tipped in photos during a workshop at the Black Rock Press within the Art Department at the University of Nevada, Reno.

In 2016, the book Dooby Lane: Also Known as Guru Road, A Testament Inscribed in Stone Tablets by DeWayne Williams, authored by Snyder and Goin, was released with a much larger publishing run. The 2016 book expands on the 1996 book and includes a description of Williams and details about the meaning of the names and phrases appearing on the stones. Many of the research materials, including journal entries made by visitors, reside in the Peter Goin Papers, Special Collections and University Archives, University of Nevada, Reno Libraries.

Since Williams' death, others have added their art to Dooby Lane.

In 2020 Ormat Technologies proposed a geothermal project in the area of Dooby Lane. In December, 2021, the Bureau of Land Management solicited public comment on the project and included a map that showed the well pads being located across Nevada State Route 34 from Dooby Lane. In October 2024, the Burning Man Project and Ormat Technologies reached a settlement that included Burning Man purchasing Ormat's geothermal leases near the Black Rock Desert. This agreement resolved a lawsuit filed by Burning Man and other groups challenging the Bureau of Land Management's approval of the geothermal exploration project. The acquisition effectively canceled the exploratory drilling project that Burning Man organizers and local residents opposed, citing potential environmental damage and aesthetic impact on the area.

Dooby Lane is located on a right-of-way issued by the Bureau of Land Management. The original agreement expired on September 23, 2023 and was renewed in April 2024, expiring on December 31, 2054.

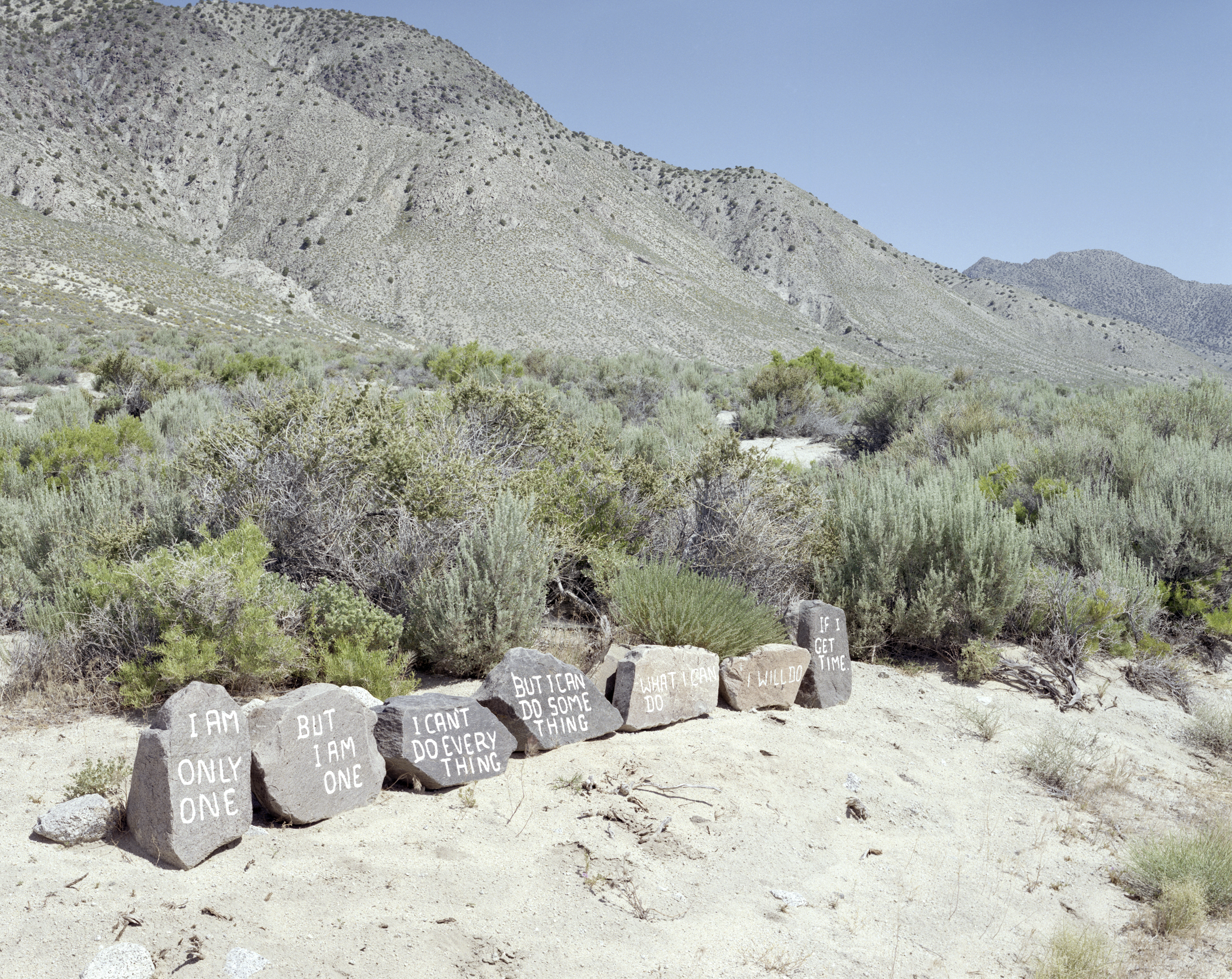
A series of inscribed stone tablets along Dooby Lane by DeWayne Williams, photographed by Peter Goin, 2016.

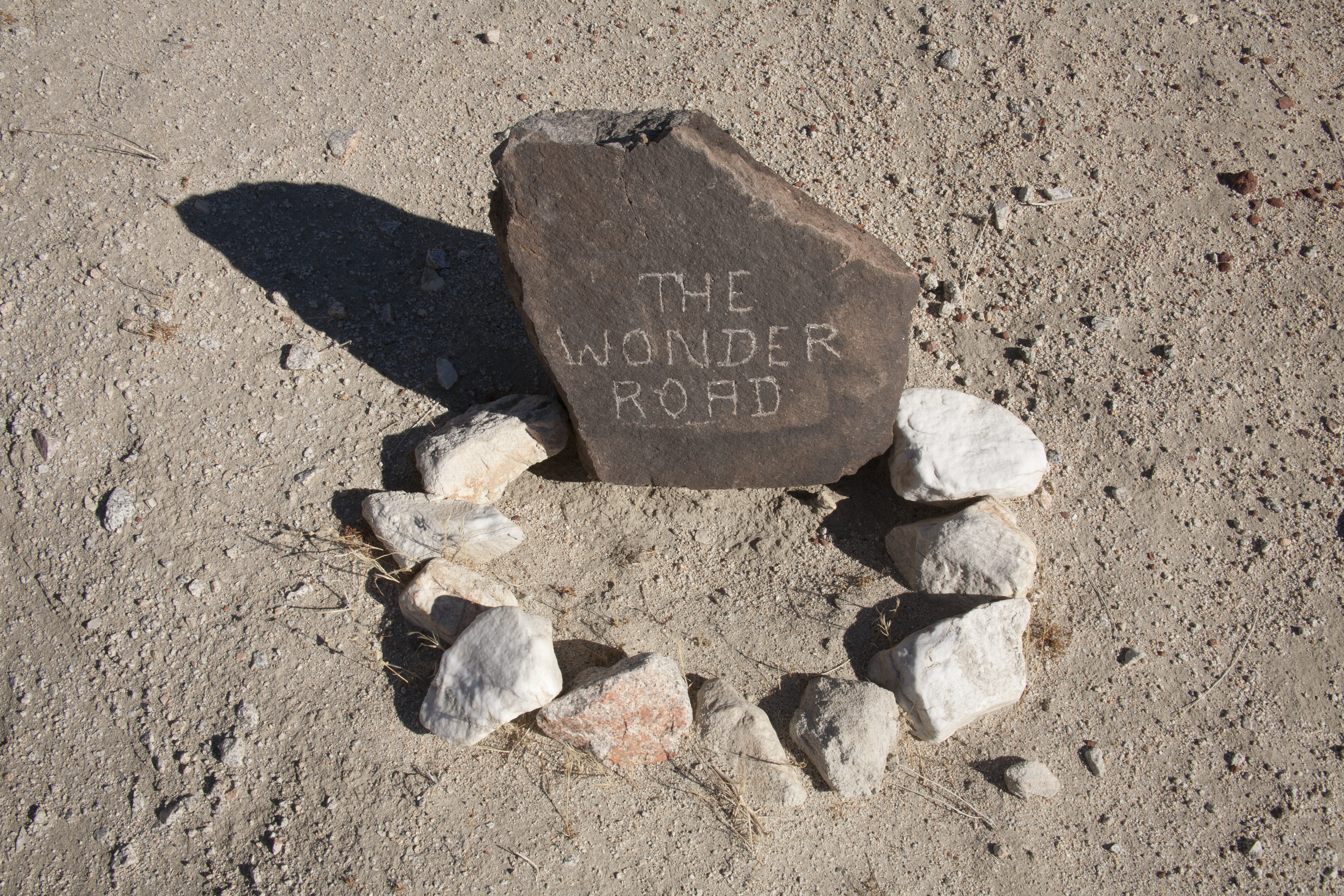
"The Wonder Road" inscribed rock by DeWayne Williams at Dooby Lane, photographed by Peter Goin, 2007.

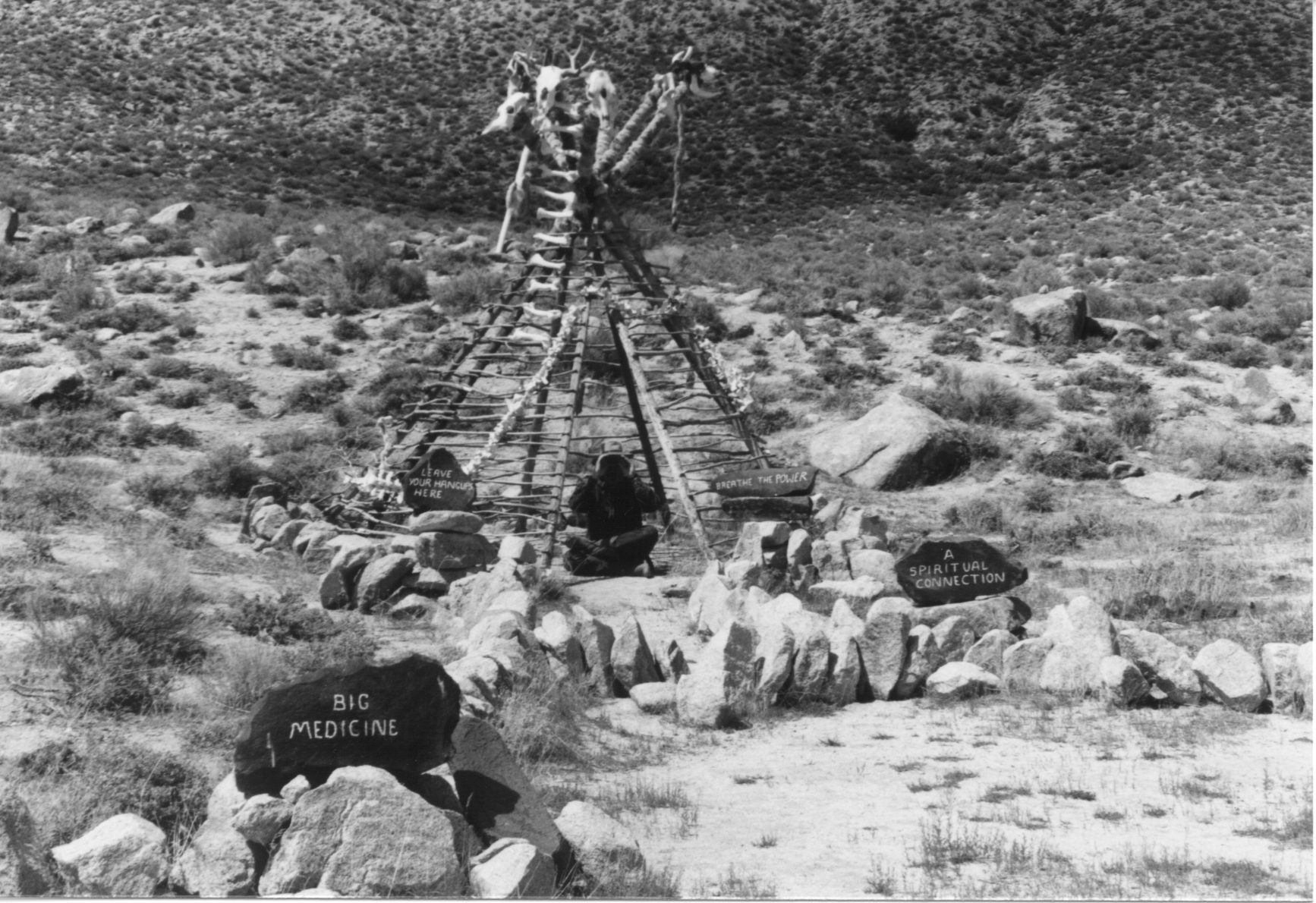
Teepee art at Dooby Lane, 1990.

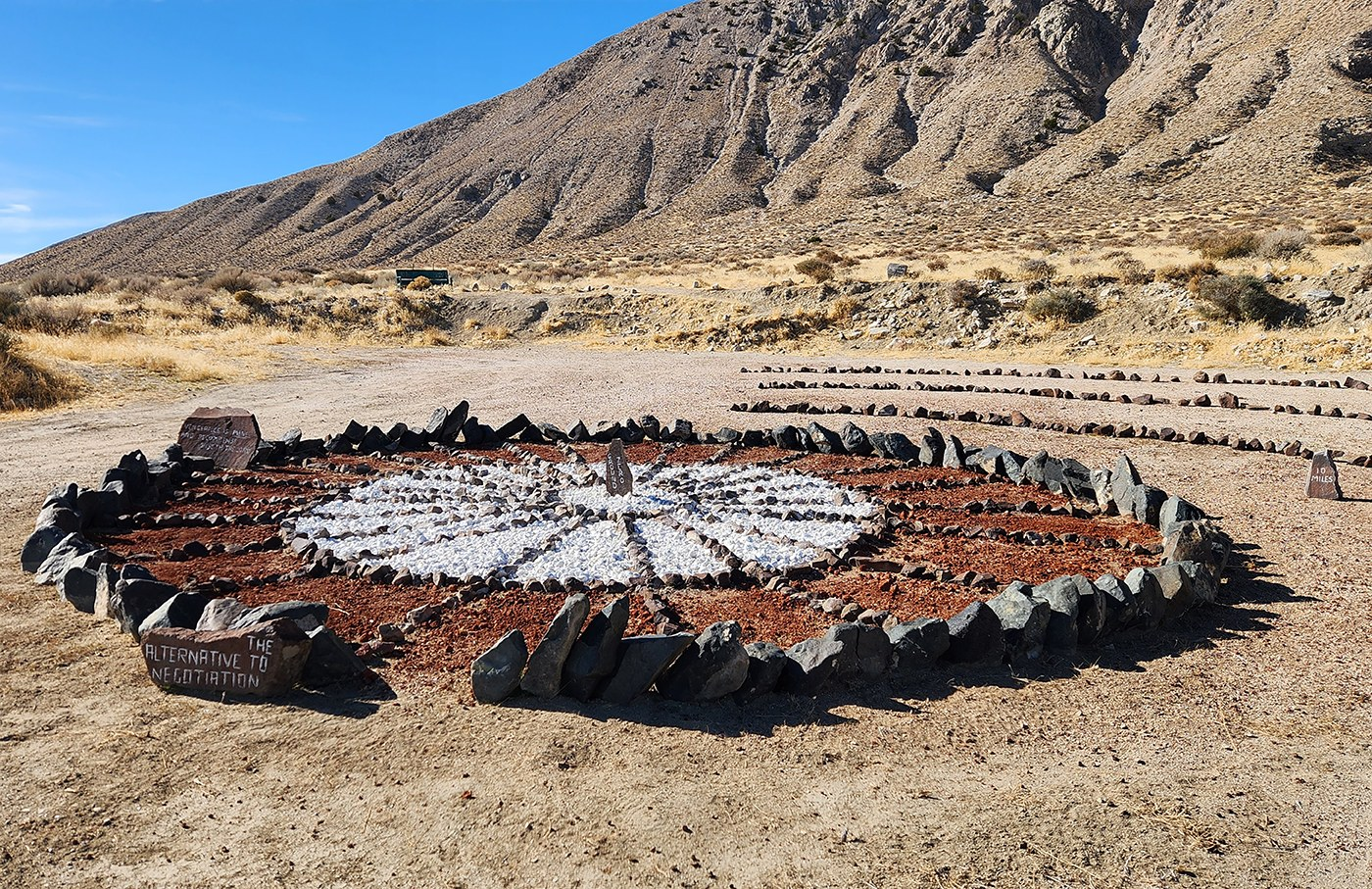
"Ground Zero" rock art installation, restored October 2024.
