= Murder of Mario Cerciello Rega =

2019 murder of Italian police officer

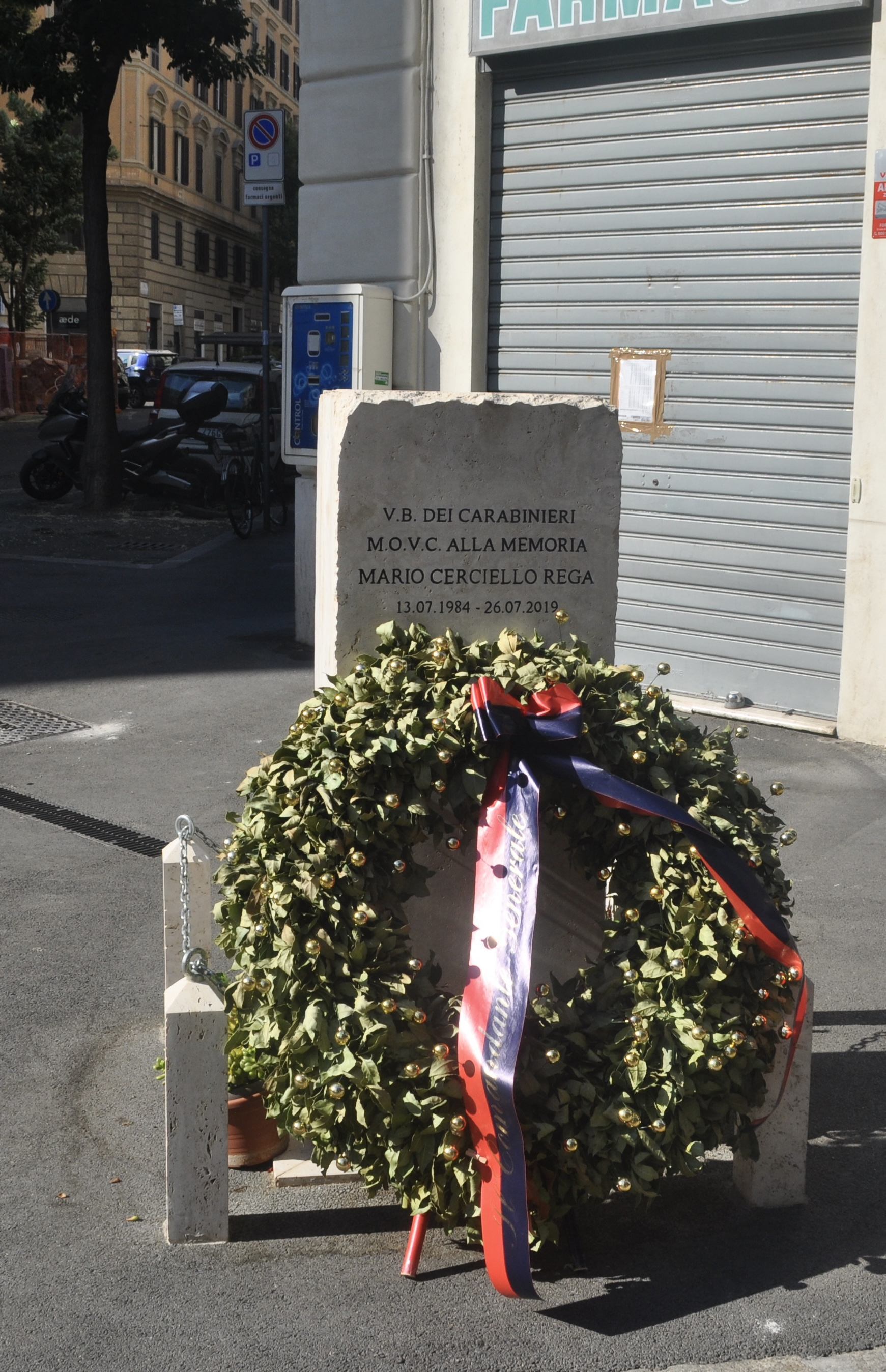
- Location: Rome, Italy
- Date: 26 July 2019
- Weapon: Combat knife
- Deaths: 1
- Victim: Mario Cerciello Rega
- Perpetrators: Finnegan Lee Elder; Gabriel Christian Natale-Hjorth
- Verdict: Life imprisonment, later commuted to 15 years and 2 months for Elder, 11 years and 4 months for Natale-Hjorth.

Mario Cerciello Rega was an Italian police officer. He was murdered on 26 July 2019 by two American students visiting Rome. Deputy Brigadier Rega, age 35, was a member of the Carabinieri, Italy's national military police force. He was stabbed to death as he investigated a drug deal. Carabinieri Officer Andrea Varriale, Rega's police partner, was injured. In May 2021, two American students from California were found guilty of the murder. Finnegan Lee Elder, age 19 at the time of the crime, and Gabriel Christian Natale-Hjorth, age 18, were each sentenced to life in prison.

In March 2022, an appeals court confirmed the homicide verdicts but commuted the life terms for both men, reducing Elder to 24 years in prison and Natale-Hjorth to 22 years in prison.

In July 2024, after a retrial ordered by the Corte di Cassazione in 2023, their conviction was upheld by the Court of Appeal with reduced sentences of 15 years 2 months and 11 years 4 months respectively.

== Perpetrators ==
Finnegan Lee Elder and Gabriel Christian Natale-Hjorth became friends while attending Tamalpais High School in Mill Valley, California. Elder had previously attended Sacred Heart Cathedral Preparatory in San Francisco, California, but was asked to leave after an altercation with another student.

== Killing ==
On the night of 25 July, Elder and Natale-Hjorth went to the Trastevere district to buy cocaine. Only Natale-Hjorth could speak Italian. When they realized that the pusher had sold them crushed aspirin, they stole a backpack from Sergio Brugiatelli, who had led them to the dealer. Brugiatelli borrowed a phone and called his own number. The two young men answered, telling him that if he wanted his backpack back, he would have to bring them 100 euros and a gram of cocaine. Brugiatelli called the Carabinieri, telling them he needed his backpack back because it contained his documents. The Carabinieri sent two officers, who went unarmed and in plain street clothes to meet the two men, while Brugiatelli waited nearby. At the meetingplace, Elder stabbed Rega 11 times. The two Americans immediately went back to their hotel, a block away.

== See also ==
- Crime in Italy
- Law enforcement in Italy

== Sources ==
- D'Emilio, Frances (4 May 2021). "US men await their fate as murder trial nears end in Rome". ABC News. Associated Press.
- "Two American friends jailed for life after killing Italian police officer while teenagers". Sky News. 6 May 2021.
- Povoledo, Elisabetta (5 May 2021). "2 Americans Sentenced to Life in Prison for Murder of Italian Police Officer". The New York Times.
- Harlan, Chico (6 May 2021). "Italian jury convicts 2 Americans of murder, with a punishment of life in prison, in 2019 killing of police officer". Washington Post.
- "Finnegan Elder, American Teen Accused Of Killing Italian Police Officer, Has Violent Past". YourTango. 31 July 2019.
- "Bay Area man says he stabbed Italian cop in self-defense". The Mercury News. Associated Press. 2 March 2021.
- Povoledo, Elisabetta (21 July 2020). "Officer Details Killing of Police Partner in Trial of Americans in Rome". The New York Times.
