= Willie Hector =

American football player and coach (born 1939)

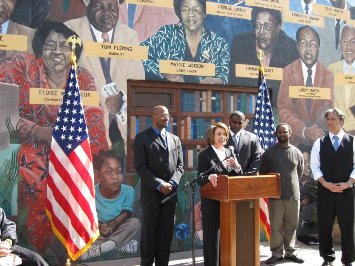

No. 62, 45, 52, 54
- Positions: Guard, tackle

Personal information
- Born: December 23, 1939 (age 86); New Iberia, Louisiana, U.S.
- Listed height: 6 ft 2 in (1.88 m)
- Listed weight: 220 lb (100 kg)

Career information
- High school: Tamalpais (Mill Valley, California)
- College: Pacific
- NFL draft: 1961: 5th round, 60th overall pick
- AFL draft: 1961: 10th round, 80th overall pick

Career history

Playing
- Los Angeles Rams (1961); Calgary Stampeders (1962–1963); San Jose Apaches (1967)

Coaching
- Tamalpais High School (1966–1968) Head coach

Career NFL statistics
- Games played: 12
- Stats at Pro Football Reference

Willie Hector, Jr. (born December 23, 1939) is an American former professional football player who was an offensive guard for one season with the Los Angeles Rams of the National Football League (NFL). He was selected by the Rams in the fifth round of the 1961 NFL draft. He was also drafted by the San Diego Chargers of the American Football League (AFL) in the tenth round of the 1961 AFL draft. Hector played college football for the Pacific Tigers. He was also a member of the Calgary Stampeders of the Canadian Football League (CFL).

== Early life ==
Hector played high school football at Tamalpais High School in Mill Valley, California and earned all-Northern California honors in 1956.

== College career ==
Hector participated in football and track for the Pacific Tigers of the University of the Pacific. He competed in numerous track events for the Tigers, including the hurdles, high jump, long jump and 100-yard dash. He was named Pacific's Outstanding Track Athlete as a senior in 1961. Hector was inducted into the Pacific Athletics Hall of Fame as part of the 2001-02 class.

== Professional career ==
Hector was selected by the Los Angeles Rams of the NFL with the 60th overall pick in the 1961 NFL draft. He was also selected by the San Diego Chargers of the AFL with the 80th overall pick in the 1961 AFL draft. He played in twelve games for the Rams during the 1961 season. Hector then played for the Calgary Stampeders of the CFL from 1962 to 1963, appearing in one game in 1962 and five games in 1963.

== Coaching career ==
Hector was the head football coach at Tamalpais High School from the 1965 season through 1968.

== Personal life ==
Willie's sons Zuri and Byron both played football as well. Zuri played as a defensive back for the USC Trojans. Byron played football for the Cal Golden Bears. Willie's grandson Ayden Hector was a four star prospect in the class of 2020 at Eastside Catholic School in Sammamish, Washington. He was named as a defensive back to the Class 3A all-state high school football team in his junior year, after the Eastside Crusaders won the WIAA 3A State Championship.
