= Ann Killion =

American sports journalist and author

- Occupation: Sports journalist

Ann Killion is an American sports journalist and author. She has written for Sports Illustrated, San Francisco Chronicle, Comcast Sportsnet, San Jose Mercury News, and Los Angeles Times. She is the co-author of two books with Olympic gold medalists: Throw Like a Girl: How to Dream Big & Believe in Yourself with Jennie Finch and Solo: A Memoir of Hope with Hope Solo.

== Early life and education ==
Killion was raised in Mill Valley, California and has two brothers, Paul and Tom Killion. She attended Tamalpais High School where she was the sports editor for the school newspaper. She completed her college degree at UCLA and obtained her master's degree in journalism from Columbia University.

== Works ==
- Throw Like a Girl: How to Dream Big & Believe in Yourself. By Jennie Finch and Ann Killion. Location: 2011.
- Solo: A Memoir of Hope. By Hope Solo and Ann Killion. Location: 2012.
