= Smokey the Bear Sutra =

1969 poem by Gary Snyder

The Smokey the Bear Sutra is a 1969 poem by Gary Snyder which presents environmental concerns in the form of a Buddhist sutra, and depicts Smokey as the reincarnation of Vairocana Buddha. Snyder composed the poem in one night for a February 1969 Sierra Club Wilderness Conference, at which he distributed the first copies. It was later performed during the first Earth Day celebrations in 1970. A note at the end of the poem states that it "may be reproduced free forever" thus dedicating it to the public domain, and it has since been widely disseminated in print and electronic forms.

== See also ==
- Gary Snyder
