= Peter Goin =

American photographer (born 1951)

- Occupation: Professor of Art
- Children: 2

Peter Goin (born 1951) is an American photographer best known for his work within the altered landscape, specifically his photographs published in the book Nuclear Landscapes. His work has been shown in over fifty museums nationally and internationally and he is the recipient of two National Endowment for the Arts Fellowships. Goin was as Foundation Professor of Art in Photography and Videography at the University of Nevada, Reno until 2025.

== Biography ==
Peter Goin was born in Madison, Wisconsin, in 1951. He grew up a third culture kid, spending time in Indonesia, Turkey, and Brazil as a child and young adult. Goin received his MA and MFA from the University of Iowa. He moved to Nevada in 1984. He became fascinated with the basin-and-range environment—much of Nevada belongs to the Bureau of Land Management and is removed from private ownership making it open for camping, exploring, and photographing. The focus of his work is the American West and specifically the Nevada landscape.

Intrigued by the effects of humans on the landscape, Goin uses photography to depict landscapes that have been altered. In his book Nuclear Landscapes, Goin presents photographs of various nuclear test sites and power facilities that have been abandoned and the effects these sites and facilities have on the surrounding area. He gained unprecedented access to test sites and facilities in Nevada, Washington, and the South Pacific (as well as risked exposure to radiation and shark attack) in order to examine these unique places. This project investigates and documents evidence of the cultural modification of nuclear landscapes, and includes images at the Nevada Test Site, the Hanford Nuclear Site, the Trinity Site, and the Marshall Islands. Additional series of work include his photographic survey of the Mexican–American border: Tracing the Line, a survey of the border from Brownsville, Texas, to Tijuana, Mexico, that investigates the relationship of the border line to the landscape, including how the boundary line divides the landscape and whether there is a distinction between the human-made and natural landscape; Humanature, in which Goin explores and documents the extent to which people and nature have become a continuum; Black Rock, a detailed analysis and lyrical interpretation of the Black Rock Desert, a previously avoided or neglected region of Nevada that is about the size of Delaware, that shows the visual, physical, and historical complexity of the place; and his narrative photograms, The Pursuit of Happiness, structured loosely on the narrative format, the panels can be read individually or as a whole and reflect the design and concept of Indonesian shadow puppets. Awards for his work include two National Endowment for the Arts Fellowships and at the turn of the new century he was awarded the Governor's Millennium Award for Excellence in the Arts.

Goin's video work has also garnered acclaim. He earned the Best Experimental Documentary Award at the 2001 New York International Film & Video Festival for his video Structures of Everyday Life. Structures weaves together narrative and visual vignettes from months of videotaping a group of Reno, Nevada teens, showing adolescents speaking their views and expressing their desire for acceptance. The program was aired by PBS in 2001. Other videos of Goin's include In Search of Ritual: The Burning Man, which interprets the Burning Man art festival through multiple voices and viewpoints of participants at the 1993 event. In Search of Ritual: The Burning Man was nominated for an EMMY in 1994. Goin has coauthored numerous books as well as served as an editor for several texts.

== Selected books ==
- Tracing the Line: A Photographic Survey of the Mexican-American Border., Artist Limited Edition, 1987
- Nuclear Landscapes. Johns Hopkins University Press, 1991
- Stopping Time: A Rephotographic Survey of Lake Tahoe. University of New Mexico Press, 1992
- Arid Waters: Photographs From the Water in the West Project, University of Nevada Press, 1992
- Humanature. University of Texas Press, 1996
- A Doubtful River. University of Nevada Press, 2003
- Changing Mines in America. University of Chicago Press, 2004
- Black Rock. University of Nevada Press, 2005 [coauthor Paul F. Starrs] (in paperback, Black Rock Institute Press, 2010)
- Nevada Rock Art. Black Rock Institute Press, 2009
- South Lake Tahoe: Now & Then. Arcadia, 2010
- A Field Guide to California Agriculture. University of California Press, 2010 (coauthor Paul F. Starrs)
- A Maritime History of Lake Tahoe. Arcadia, 2012
- Time and Time Again: History, Rephotography, and Preservation in the Chaco World. [co-authored with Lucy Lippard] Museum of New Mexico Press. 2013. [Selected by the Pima Public Libraries in Arizona as a Southwest Book of the Year for 2013.]
- Douglass, William A. Death After Life. Black Rock Institute Press, Reno, NV. 2015. [Illustrations by Peter Goin.] Finalist Award, Regional Fiction 2016 category of the Indie Book Awards national competition.
- Douglass, William A. Muerte Después de Vida: Relatos de Nevada. Editorial Pamiela, Spain. 2015. [Illustrations by Peter Goin.] / [Also published in Basque edition.]
- Dooby Lane [coauthored with Gary Snyder]. Counterpoint Press. 2016.
- A New Form of Beauty: Glen Canyon Beyond Climate Change. [coauthored with Peter Frederici, Northern Arizona University] University of Arizona Press. 2016. Honorable Mention Award International Photography Awards, Professional, Book, Nature. Awarded 2017]
- Emerald Bay & the Desolation Wilderness. Arcadia Publishers. 2018.

== Selected exhibitions ==
Solo Exhibitions

- "Árboles de Cholula (Trees of Cholula)," OXS Gallery, Carson City, NV. January 28, 2013 – March 22, 2013.
- "Black Rock," Wild & Scenic Film Festival, Reno, NV. May 3, 2013.
- "Humanature," Gregg Museum of Art & Design, Raleigh, NC. January 17 – April 26, 2013.
- "Lake Tahoe Photographs Art/Science Collaboration," Lake Tahoe Summit 2013, Sand Harbor, Lake Tahoe, August 19, 2013.
- "Codices of Nevada and Beyond," Sierra Arts Gallery, Reno, NV. November 27, 2012 – January 3, 2013.
- "Árboles Urbanos," Instituto Municipal de Arte y Cultural de Puebla, Puebla, Mexico. [two galleries] February 11 – March 13, 2010.
- " Árboles Urbanos," [seis fotos] in the exhibit: "ARCA de la Ecología, Departamento de Exposiciones, Puebla, Mexico. 16 April – 5 May 2010.
- "A Conversation With Peter Goin," Host Michael Hagerty, KNPB, Channel 5, originally aired on 9 May 2010. [30 minute program]
- [continuation of] – "Cholula de mis Amores," Casa del Caballero Aquila Gallery, Cholula, Mexico, November 20 – February 28, 2010. [Three galleries]
- "Fire!" Halden Gallery, South Lake Tahoe, CA. April 15 – June 18, 2010.
- "Que Chula es Cholula," Casa del Caballero Aquila Gallery, Cholula, Mexico, October 2009 - February 2010
- "Narrative Photogram Light Boxes: Wilshire/Normandie Metro Station," Los Angeles Public Art, Los Angeles, CA, 2007–2009
- "Peter Goin: Images from Black Rock," Jordan Schnitzer Museum of Art, Eugene, OR, April - June 2007
- "Black Rock," Nevada Museum of Art, Reno, NV 2005–2006
- "Contested Places," Riverside Art Museum, Riverside, CA, 2005
- "Structures of Everyday Life," video screening New York International Independent Film and Video Festival, February 2002. Second screening in Los Angeles, July 2002. (Best Experimental Documentary Award; also accepted for national distribution through the American Program Service and distribution through Films through the Humanities & Sciences), 2002
- "Humanature inclusive," 'Kunst'haus, Nurnberg, Germany (major exhibit combining all of the Humanature and Nuclear Landscapes exhibition photographs), 2001
- "Peter Goin, Fotowerken," MKgalerie, Rotterdam, The Netherlands, 2001
- "Kerne Landskaber," Museet for Fotographie, Odense, Denmark. Traveling exhibit includes Copenhagen and Rotterdam, The Netherlands. 1999
- "The Pleasure of Anxiety and Other Tales," Gallery 44, Toronto, Canada, 1999
- "Nuclear Landscapes & Humanature," Museum fur Photographie, Braunschweig, Germany, 1998
- "Humanature," Center for Perceptual and Experimental Art, Buffalo, NY, 1997

Group Exhibitions

- "The Altered Landscape: Selections from the Carol Franc Buck Altered Landscape Photography Collection," Nevada Museum of Art, February 4, 2017 – July 6, 2017.
- "City of Dust: The Evolution of Burning Man," Nevada Museum of Art, July1 – January 28, 2018.
- " Hiroshima Nunca Mais," Legislative Assembly of Goiânia, Brasil and Centro Cultural Culturama, Goiânia, Brasil, September 12 - October 21, 2017.
- "Home Means Nevada," Nevada Arts Council Nevada Touring Initiative (NTI) Program, 2017–2019.
- "Longer Ways to Go: Photographs of the American Road," Phoenix Art Museum, April 15 – October 15, 2017. [Color scheme of exhibit tied to photograph, Roman Numeral IX]
- "Truckee Meadows Reflections," Sparks Heritage Museum, Sparks, NV. January 16 – March 27, 2017.
- "California: The Art of Water," Cantor Arts Center, Stanford University, Stanford, CA. July 16 – November 28, 2016.
- "Contemporary Gallery", Joslyn Museum of Art, Omaha, NE. March – (TBD), 2016.
- "Here Now: 80 Years of Photography at the Mint," Mint Museum Uptown, Charlotte, NC, April 16 – September 18, 2016.
- "Home Means Nevada," Russell Rotunda, Senate Office Building, Washington, D.C. Sponsored by the Nevada Field Office of the National Parks Conservation Association (NPCA) and the Contemporary Arts Center of Las Vegas (CAC), September 2016. *catalog.
- Selections from Nuclear Landscapes: "Exposição Hiroshima 70" Matilha Cultural, São Paulo- SP – Brazil, November 10 – December 18, 2016.
- "Sublime. The Tremor of the World," Centre Pompidou-Metz, Metz, France, February 10 – September 5, 2016. *book publication titled The Edge of the Earth: Climate Change in Photography and Video.
- "40/40 Exhibition," Blue Sky Gallery, Portland, Oregon, October 1 – November 1, 2015.
- [traveling exhibit, continuing] "Environmental Impact," Brookgreen Gardens, Murrells Inlet, SC. January 31 – April 26, 2015; Paul and Lulu Hilliard University Art Museum, University of Louisiana at Lafayette, May 16 – August 8, 2015; and, The Art Museum, SUNY Potsdam, Potsdam, NY, September 1 – October 31, 2015.
- "Tahoe: A Visual History," Nevada Museum of Art, August 22, 2015 – January 10, 2016. [*book publication Skira Rizzoli Publisher, 2015; the exhibit was the largest in the Nevada Museum of Art's history.]
- "Trinity Site," Hiroshima Bank, Hiroshima, Japan. October, 2015. [Exhibition of curated Atomic Photographer's Guild photographs.]
- "Manifesto Series: Monumentality," Storefront for Art and Architecture, New York, NY. [Video exhibit + presentation, March 18, 2014.]
- "Environmental Impact," The R.W. Norton Art Gallery, Shreveport, LA. November 19, 2013
- "Environmental Impact," Canton Museum of Art, Canton, Ohio. September 1 – October 31, 2013.
- "From Above: Aerial Photography from the Center for Creative Photography," Center for Creative Photography, University of Arizona, Tucson, AZ. May 4 – September 22, 2013.
- "Through Your Eyes Artists-in-Residence" online exhibit, National Park Service [juried selection; ongoing site]:
- "To Become Visible: Archaic Petroglyphs in Oregon County," Jacobs Gallery, Hult Center for the Performing Arts, Eugene, Oregon. January 25 – March 16, 2013.
- "Atomic Photographer's Guild (exhibit, working title)", World Uranium Film Festival, Rio de Janeiro, Brazil, 28 June – 14 July 2012.
- "Behind the Atom Curtain: Life and Death in the Nuclear Age," Rocky Flats Cold War Museum, September 28-November 30, 2012; through popular demand continued through December 15, 2012.
- "Behind the Atom Curtain: Life and Death in the Nuclear Age," Foto Freo Photography Festival, Perth, Australia. 14 March – 15 April 2012.
- "Down to Earth: Herblock and Photographers Observe the Environment," Library of Congress, Washington, D.C. September 22 – March 23, 2013.
- "The Altered Landscape: Photographs of a Changing Environment," Nevada Museum of Art, September 24, 2011 – January 15, 2012.
- "America Deserta," Centre d art contemporain, Parc Saint Léger, France. 27 June – 5 September 2010.
- "Nuclear Landscapes prints + panorama," London Art Fair, London, England, January, 2010, via Ordinary-Light Photography Gallery.
- "Ancient Ofrenda: Elements of an Altar," Arizona State University Museum of Anthropology, Tempe, Arizona, October 2008 - January 2009 (homage to Day of the Dead)
- "Contemporary Desert Photography: The Other Side of Paradise," Roswell Art Museum, June - August 2009
- "Acclimatation," Centre National d'art Contemporain, Nice, France, October - May 2008 (catalog)
- "Imaging A Shattering Earth: Contemporary Photography and the Environmental Debate," National Gallery of Canada, June - October 2008
- "The Nuclear Dilemma," International Red Cross and Red Crescent Museum, Geneva, Switzerland and the Gernika Peace Museum, Spain, 2008 (catalog)
- "1st International Exhibition of Photography," Halic University, Istanbul, Turkey, November - December 2007 (catalog)
- "Enigma: Absence + Presence in Contemporary Art," Nevada Museum of Art, Reno, NV, August 2007 - January 2008
- "Nevada Now: Selections from Nevada Arts Council Artist Fellowship Program," Nevada Touring Initiative, UNLV Marjorie Barrick Museum of Natural History, March - April 2006 and Nevada State Library & Archives, September - November 2006
- "The Altered Landscape: The Carol Franc Buck Collection," The National Academy of Sciences, August - October 2005 and the Keck Center of the National Academies, Washington, D.C., 2006
- "Heartfelt," Museum of Fine Arts, Florida State University, Tallahassee, Florida, 2005 (catalog)
- "Ansel Adams and the Development of Landscape Photography in America," Sheldon Art Galleries, St. Louis, Missouri, 2003
- "Masterworks of American Photography," Amon Carter Museum, Ft. Worth, Texas, 2003
