= Davida Wills Hurwin =

American writer

Davida Wills Hurwin is an American writer who is best known for her books A Time for Dancing and The Farther You Run.

A Time For Dancing received the ALA's best books award, South Carolina Award. The Farther You Run was a NY Best books for Teens. Freaks and Revelations was a 2011 Stonewall Honor Book. Hurwin is also an educator, teaching Theater at Crossroads School for Arts and Sciences in Los Angeles, California.

== Works ==
- A Time for Dancing (1997, Penguin Group). This was adapted by into the screenplay for the movie released in Italy as Dancing, and released in the US on Showtime as A Time for Dancing (2000).
- The Farther You Run (2003 for hardcover, 2005 for paperback, Penguin Group)
- Circle the Soul Softly (2006, HarperCollins).
- Freaks and Revelations (2009)
