= A Time for Dancing =

- DVD cover
- Directed by: Peter Gilbert
- Written by: Davida Wills Hurwin
- Starring: Larisa Oleynik; Shiri Appleby; Peter Coyote
- Cinematography: Alex Nepomniaschy
- Edited by: Amy E. Duddleston; Stuart H. Pappé
- Music by: Laurence Rosenthal
- Distributed by: StudioWorks Entertainment
- Release date: September 2002
- Running time: 100 minutes
- Country: United States
- Language: English

A Time for Dancing is a 2002 American drama film directed by Peter Gilbert and starring Larisa Oleynik, Shiri Appleby and Peter Coyote. It is an adaptation based on the novel of the same name by Davida Wills Hurwin. The film had its United States premiere on Showtime in 2004.

== Plot ==
Sam Russell tells the story of her best friend Jules Michaels. They met at the age of 6 in a dance class. Over the years they become best friends. Sam dances, but Jules is a true dancer, with true passion towards it and views it as important as life itself. Unfortunately, her passion becomes impossible when it turns out she has cancer.

Even after the bad news has been confirmed, Jules has a hard time dealing with it and still insists upon going for dance. To decrease the rate at which the cancer is spreading, she starts going for chemotherapy, which leaves her very exhausted after each time. It also causes her hair to fall out. Jules gradually has no choice but to start accepting the fact that she has to stop dancing because her body is always too lethargic.

However, Jules stops the chemo to dance once more and auditions for Juilliard in NYC as it has always been a dream of hers to get in. It takes a lot out of her but it pays off and she gets accepted.

Not long after, though, Jules loses the fight to cancer and dies.

Sam opens the letter from Juilliard and replies: "Jules Michaels won't be attending Juilliard 'cause she died".

== Cast ==
- Larisa Oleynik as Jules
- Shiri Appleby as Sam
- Peter Coyote as Wynn
- Patricia Kalember as Sandra
- Scott Vickaryous as Eli
- Shane West as Paul
- Lynn Whitfield as Linda
- Amy Madigan as Jackie
- Anton Yelchin as Jackson
- Jennifer Hamilton as Colleen
- Barbara Eve Harris as Dr. Conner

== Reception ==
A Time For Dancing was nominated for a Daytime Emmy Award and a DGA award.
