= Mark Morford =

American journalist

Mark Morford is a former columnist and culture critic for SFGATE. His opinion column was called Notes & Errata. His topics varied from sex and deviance to popular culture, technology, spirituality, music and politics.

== Writing career ==
From 1999 to 2003, Morford wrote The Morning Fix, a newsletter for SFGATE, which featured comments on news and current events, along with other personal, informal elements. The Fix began as a daily newsletter, then shifted to no more than three times a week, before being discontinued.

Morford's online column was launched in 2000. It was added to the print edition of the Chronicle in 2005, where it ran in the Datebook (entertainment) section for three years in a slightly abbreviated form than the concurrent SFGATE version. The column was later pulled from the print edition in mid-2008 by the Chronicle's then-editor, Ward Bushee.

In 2001 Morford was suspended over a column on the sexual relationship between a teenage male student and an older female teacher, a column that was perceived as overly permissive. In 2003 he was suspended again for violating Chronicle language usage guidelines.

Morford gained publicity for his column "Is Obama an Enlightened Being?", published in June 2008 about then-presidential candidate Barack Obama, in which he wrote, "Many spiritually advanced people I know (not coweringly religious, mind you, but deeply spiritual) identify Obama as a Lightworker, that rare kind of attuned being who has the ability to lead us not merely to new foreign policies or health care plans or whatnot, but who can actually help usher in a new way of being on the planet, of relating and connecting and engaging with this bizarre earthly experiment." The column, and specifically the term "Lightworker", were mocked in publications including National Review, The American Spectator and SF Weekly.

Morford's writing has appeared in other publications, including Mother Jones, Sun Magazine, Bark and Yoga Journal. He also blogs for the Huffington Post.

== Books ==
Morford's first book, The Daring Spectacle: Adventures in Deviant Journalism, a compendium of his SFGATE columns, as well as various banned works and samples of hate mail from conservative detractors, was published in early 2010 by Rapture Machine, Inc.

== Awards and honors ==
Morford has twice won first place in the online segment of the National Society of Newspaper Columnists' annual contest. He has been nominated multiple times for GLAAD Media Awards for his columns in support of gay rights.

== Yoga and teaching ==
Since 2000, along with his writing career, Morford has taught Vinyasa yoga classes in San Francisco, most recently at the Yoga Tree network of schools, as well as private instruction. He is a certified, RYT 200 yoga teacher, according to Yoga Alliance guidelines.
