= Mountains and Rivers Without End =

Epic poem by Gary Snyder

Mountains and Rivers Without End is an epic poem by American poet and essayist Gary Snyder. Snyder began writing the thirty-nine poems contained in the epic in 1956 and published the final version in 1996. The work is divided into four parts, each exploring a different theme.
