= Nanao Sakaki =

Japanese poet (1923–2008)

Nanao Sakaki (1923 – December 22, 2008) was a Japanese poet, author of Bellyfulls and leading personality of the Japanese countercultural group the Tribe. He was born to a large family in Kagoshima Prefecture, and raised by parents who ran an indigo dye-house.

== Biography ==
After completing compulsory education at age twelve, he worked as an office boy in Kagoshima. He was a draftee radar specialist stationed in Kyushu in the military, and surreptitiously read Nietzsche, Schopenhauer, Kropotkin, Marx, and Engels as time allowed. After the war, he went to Tokyo, living in an underpass near Ueno Station, working for a short time at a foundry in Amagasaki, then as a turner, and then for some two and a half years running errands for Sanehiko Yamamoto's office.

Around 1952–1953 he moved to the San'ya district and lived off the generosity of his neighbors, spending all his time studying English and reading. After two years there, he moved to Shinjuku, Tokyo, became interested in primitive art, and collaborated with a wood sculptor. They visited forests all over Japan for some three years. During this time, Sakaki began to write poems expressing a deep relationship with the forests. This led to exhibitions combining poetry and sculpture in Kagoshima in 1955 and in Ikebukuro in 1959.

Sakaki and the sculptor then went separate ways, Sakaki returning to Shinkuju and becoming friends with Neale Hunter. The two of them made a practice of never sleeping in the same place twice. They co-translated some of his poems into English and published them in Tokyo 1961 as the book Bellyfulls. Gary Snyder sought out Sakaki after Hunter introduced him to this book in India. Snyder and Sakaki shared many interests, including linguistics, Bushman ethnology, Sanskrit, Japanese archeology, Marx, Jung, Nagarjuna, and revolution.

It was also around this time that Sakaki helped create and lead Japanese countercultural group the Tribe, and led these friends to Suwanosejima to build the Banyan Ashram. Bellyfulls was reprinted in the US in 1966, and starting in 1969, Sakaki made several trips to the United States, exploring the wilderness, writing, and reading poetry. He spent about ten years in the United States, primarily in San Francisco and Taos, New Mexico, but also walking widely.

Sakaki was married twice and had two sons in Hokkaido, Yuki and Mizu Araki; another in New Mexico, Issa Sakaki Merrill; and a daughter, Maggie Tai Sakaki Tucker. At the time of his death in 2008, he was living with friends in the mountains of Nagano prefecture.

== List of works ==
In English

- Sakaki, Nanao. Bellyfulls (1966) Toad Press.
- Sakaki, Nanao. Real Play (1981) Tooth of Time Books.
- Sakaki, Nanao. Break the Mirror (1987) North Point Press.
- Sakaki, Nanao. Let's Eat Stars (1997) Blackberry Books.
- Sakaki, Nanao. Inch by Inch: 45 Haiku by Issa (1999) La Alameda Press.
- Sakaki, Nanao. How to Live on the Planet Earth: Collected Poems (2013) Blackberry Books.

In Japanese

- Inu mo arukeba 『犬も歩けば』 (野草社、1983)
- Chikyū B: Nanao Sakaki Shishū 『地球B ななおさかき 詩集』 (1989).
- Kokoperi 『ココペリ』(スタジオリーフ、1999).
- Inu mo arukeba 『犬も歩けば』 (野草社、2004).
- Kokoperi no ashiato 『ココペリの足あと』 (スタジオリーフ、2010).

In Czech

- Nanao, (1990) Pražská imaginace, translation of Jiří Wein.
- Jít na lehko..., (2022) DharmaGaia, translation of Jiří Wein.

In Finnish

- Syödään tähtiä! (2011) translation of Tero Tähtinen.

In French

- Casse Le Miroir, (1990) translation of Patrice Repusseau.

In Italian

- Viaggiare Leggeri, (1987) edition of John-Gian, translation of Rita degli Esposti.
- Con i piedi nel fango, (2000) edition of Rete Bioregionale Italiana, translation of Rita Degli Esposti.

In Korean

- 우리 별을 먹자 (2012) translation of Sung Rea Han 한성례.

In Spanish

- Cactus del viento (2017, 2018) Asociación de Escritores de México, translation of Yaxkin Melchy Ramos.
