= Daniel Caldwell =

American actor and director

- Born: 1935; Marin, California
- Died: March 15, 2015 (aged 79–80); Tiburon, California
- Other name: Dan Caldwell
- Occupations: actor, stage director, drama teacher
- Years active: 1962–2015
- Spouse: Karlene Crockett
- Children: 4

Daniel Edmund Caldwell (1935 – March 15, 2015) was an American actor, stage director and drama teacher. He was the founder of Conservatory Theatre Ensemble in Mill Valley, California, where he taught drama at Tamalpais High School.

== Early life and education ==
Caldwell attended Tamalpais High School, transferring to Sir Francis Drake High School in San Anselmo, California when it opened in 1951. He graduated from Drake in 1952.

== Teaching career ==
Caldwell taught drama for 37 years at Tamalpais High School, from 1962 until his retirement in 1999. In 1976, with Michelle Swanson, he cofounded the Ensemble Theatre Company of Marin (ETC), which later changed its name to the Conservatory Theatre Ensemble (CTE). Calwell and Swanson won the F. Loren Winship Secondary School Theatre Award from the American Alliance of Theatre and Education in 1988 and 1990.

Notable former students at Tam and CTE include Kathleen Quinlan (Class of 1972), Courtney Thorne-Smith (1985), Tupac Shakur (1989) and Merritt Butrick in the mid 70's.

In 2002, the Tamalpais Union High School District named the new theater under construction at Tam the "Daniel Caldwell Performing Arts Center." The new Center was completed and opened in 2006.

== Stage and film career ==
Caldwell's early career as a film actor includes work with Woody Allen, Otto Preminger, Michelangelo Antonioni, Tommy Chong, Richard Lester and John Korty. He was also a director in the early years of Marin Shakespeare Festival and a freelance director of the long running play, The Trial Of James McNeill Whistler. His recent work included The Art of Dining. at Marin Theatre Company, Autumn Canticle, at the Eureka Theatre, and the film Dead City, directed by his former student and CTE grad, Jason Houston.

Caldwell was vice-president of the Screen Actors Guild, serving as president of the San Francisco branch for 18 years. He served on the board of directors for the Marin Arts Council, the Magic Carpet Play Company, and Teen's Kickoff. He was married to actress Karlene Crockett.
