= Gary Snyder =

American poet (born 1930)

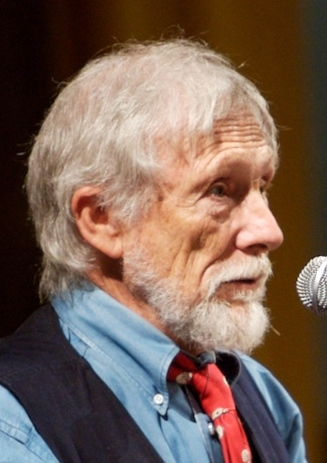
- Snyder in 2007
- Born: Gary Sherman Snyder; May 8, 1930 (age 96); San Francisco, California, U.S.
- Education: Reed College (BA); Indiana University, Bloomington
- Occupations: Poet; essayist; travel writer; translator; educator
- Spouses: Alison Gass (m. 1950; div. 1952); Joanne Kyger (m. 1960; div. 1965); Masa Uehara (m. 1967; div. 1989); Carole Lynn Koda (m. 1991; died 2007)
- Writing career
- Period: 1950–present
- Notable works: Turtle Island, 1974; The Real Work, 1980; A Place in Space, 1995; Mountains and Rivers Without End, 1996
- Notable awards: Pulitzer Prize for poetry, 1975; American Book Award, 1984; Bollingen Prize for Poetry, 1997; John Hay Award for Nature Writing, 1997; Ruth Lilly Poetry Prize, 2008
- Movements: San Francisco Renaissance, Beat Generation

Signature
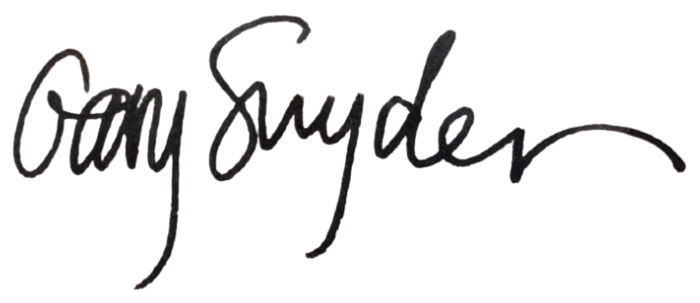

Gary Sherman Snyder (born May 8, 1930) is an American poet, essayist, lecturer, and environmental activist. His early poetry has been associated with the Beat Generation and the San Francisco Renaissance and he has been described as the "poet laureate of Deep Ecology". Snyder is a winner of a Pulitzer Prize for Poetry and the American Book Award. His work, in his various roles, reflects an immersion in both Buddhist spirituality and nature. He has translated literature into English from ancient Chinese and modern Japanese. For many years, Snyder was an academic at the University of California, Davis, and for a time served as a member of the California Arts Council.

== Life and career ==
=== Early life ===
Gary Sherman Snyder was born in San Francisco, California, to Harold and Lois Hennessy Snyder. Snyder is of German, Scottish, Irish and English ancestry. His family, impoverished by the Great Depression, moved to King County, Washington, when he was two years old. There, they tended dairy-cows, kept laying-hens, had a small orchard, and made cedar-wood shingles. At the age of seven, Snyder was bedridden for four months by an accident. "So my folks brought me piles of books from the Seattle Public Library", he recalled in an interview, "and it was then I really learned to read and from that time on was voracious — I figure that accident changed my life. At the end of four months, I had read more than most kids do by the time they're 18. And I didn't stop." Also during his ten childhood years in Washington, Snyder became aware of the presence of the Coast Salish peoples and developed an interest in the Native American peoples in general and their traditional relationship with nature.

In 1942, following his parents' divorce, Snyder moved to Portland, Oregon, with his mother and his younger sister, Anthea. Their mother, Lois Snyder Hennessy (born Wilkey), worked during this period as a reporter for The Oregonian. One of his boyhood jobs was as a newspaper copy-boy at the Oregonian. During his teen years, he attended Lincoln High School, worked as a camp counselor, and went mountain-climbing with the Mazamas youth-group. Climbing remained an interest of his, especially during his twenties and thirties. In 1947, he started attending Reed College on a scholarship. Here, he met, and, for a time, roomed with the writer Carl Proujan, and became acquainted with the young poets Philip Whalen and Lew Welch. During his time at Reed, Snyder published his first poems in a student journal. In 1948 he spent the summer working as a seaman. To get this job, he joined the now-defunct Marine Cooks and Stewards union, and would later work as a seaman in the mid-1950s to gain experience of other cultures in port cities. Snyder married Alison Gass in 1950; they separated after seven months, and divorced in 1952.

While attending Reed, Snyder conducted folklore research on the Warm Springs Indian Reservation in central Oregon. He graduated with a dual degree in anthropology and literature in 1951. Snyder's senior thesis, entitled The Dimensions of a Myth, employed perspectives from anthropology, folklore, psychology, and literature to examine a myth of the Pacific Northwest's Haida people. He spent the following few summers working as a timber scaler at Warm Springs, developing relationships with its people that were rooted less in academia. This experience formed the basis for some of his earliest published poems (including "A Berry Feast"), later collected in the book The Back Country. He also encountered the basic ideas of Buddhism and, through its arts, some East Asian traditional attitudes toward nature. He went to Indiana University with a graduate fellowship to study anthropology. (Snyder also began practicing self-taught Zen meditation.) He left after a single semester to return to San Francisco and to 'sink or swim as a poet'. Snyder worked for two summers in the North Cascades in Washington as a fire lookout, on Crater Mountain in 1952 and Sourdough Mountain in 1953 (both locations on the upper Skagit River). His attempts to get another lookout stint in 1954 (at the peak of McCarthyism), however, failed. He found himself barred from working for the government due to his association with the Marine Cooks and Stewards. Instead, he went back to Warm Springs to work in logging as a choker setter. This experience contributed to his Myths and Texts and the essay Ancient Forests of the Far West.

=== The Beats ===
Back in San Francisco, Snyder lived with Whalen, who shared his growing interest in Zen. Snyder's reading of the writings of D. T. Suzuki had in fact been a factor in his decision not to continue as a graduate student in anthropology, and in 1953 he enrolled at the University of California, Berkeley, to study Asian culture and languages. He studied ink and wash painting under Chiura Obata and Tang dynasty poetry under Ch'en Shih-hsiang. Snyder continued to spend summers working in the forests, including one summer as a trail-builder in Yosemite. He spent some months in 1955 and 1956 living in a cabin (which he dubbed "Marin-an") outside Mill Valley, California with Jack Kerouac. It was also at this time that Snyder was an occasional student at the American Academy of Asian Studies, where Saburo Hasegawa and Alan Watts, among others, were teaching. Hasegawa introduced Snyder to the treatment of landscape painting as a meditative practice. This inspired Snyder to attempt something equivalent in poetry, and with Hasegawa's encouragement, he began work on Mountains and Rivers Without End, which would be completed and published 40 years later. During these years, Snyder was writing and collecting his own work, as well as embarking on the translation of the "Cold Mountain" poems by the 8th-century Chinese recluse Han Shan; this work appeared in chapbook form in 1959, under the title Riprap & Cold Mountain Poems.

Snyder met Allen Ginsberg when the latter sought Snyder out on the recommendation of Kenneth Rexroth. Then, through Ginsberg, Snyder and Kerouac came to know each other. This period provided the materials for Kerouac's novel The Dharma Bums, and Snyder was the inspiration for the novel's main character, Japhy Ryder, in the same way Neal Cassady had inspired Dean Moriarty in On the Road. As the large majority of people in the Beat movement had urban backgrounds, writers like Ginsberg and Kerouac found Snyder, with his backcountry and manual-labor experience and interest in things rural, a refreshing and almost exotic individual. Lawrence Ferlinghetti later referred to Snyder as 'the Thoreau of the Beat Generation'.

Snyder read his poem "A Berry Feast" at the poetry reading at the Six Gallery in San Francisco (October 7, 1955) that heard the first reading of Ginsberg's poem "Howl" and marked the emergence into mainstream publicity of the Beats. This also marked Snyder's first involvement with the Beats, although he was not a member of the original New York circle, having entered the scene through his association with Whalen and Welch. As recounted in Kerouac's Dharma Bums, even at age 25 Snyder felt he could have a role in the fateful future meeting of West and East. Snyder's first book, Riprap, which drew on his experiences as a forest lookout and on the trail crew in Yosemite, was published in 1959.

=== Japan and India ===
Independently, some of the Beats, including Whalen, had become interested in Zen, but Snyder was one of the more serious scholars of the subject among them, preparing in every way he could think of for eventual study in Japan. In 1955, the First Zen Institute of America offered him a scholarship for a year of Zen training in Japan, but the State Department refused to issue him a passport, informing him that "it has been alleged you are a Communist." A subsequent District of Columbia Court of Appeals ruling forced a change in policy, and Snyder got his passport. In the end, his expenses were paid by Ruth Fuller Sasaki, for whom he was supposed to work; but initially he served as personal attendant and English tutor to Zen abbot Miura Isshu, at Rinko-in, a temple in Shokoku-ji in Kyoto, where American Buddhist popularizer Dwight Goddard and British author and Japanese culture devotee R. H. Blyth had preceded him. Mornings, after zazen, sutra chanting, and chores for the abbot, he took Japanese classes, bringing his spoken Japanese up to a level sufficient for kōan study. He developed a friendship with Philip Yampolsky, an eminent translator and scholar of Zen Buddhism, who took him around Kyoto. In early July 1955, he took refuge and requested to become Miura's disciple, thus formally becoming a Buddhist.

In 1958, he returned to California via the Persian Gulf, Turkey, Sri Lanka and various Pacific Islands, voyaging as a crewman in the engine room on the oil tanker Sappa Creek, and took up residence at Marin-an again. He turned one room into a zendo, with about six regular participants. In early June, he met the poet Joanne Kyger. They began a relationship, and eventually married. In 1959, he shipped for Japan again, where he rented a cottage outside Kyoto. He became the first foreign disciple of Rinzai Rōshi Oda Sesso, the new abbot of Daitoku-ji. He married Kyger on February 28, 1960, immediately after her arrival in Japan, which Fuller Sasaki insisted they do, if they were to live together and be associated with the Nichibei Daiichi Zen Kyokai,. Snyder and Kyger were married from 1960 to 1965.

During the period between 1956 and 1969, Snyder went back and forth between California and Japan, studying Zen, working on translations with Fuller Sasaki, and finally living for a while with a group of other people on the small, volcanic island of Suwanosejima. His previous study of written Chinese assisted his immersion in the Zen tradition, which has its roots in Tang dynasty China, and enabled him to support himself while he was living in Japan. Snyder received the Zen precepts and his dharma name of Chofu ("Listen to the Wind"), and lived occasionally as a de facto monk, but never registered to become a priest, planning eventually to return to the United States to "turn the wheel of the dharma". During this time, he published two collections of his poems from the early to mid 1950s, Myths & Texts (1960), and Six Sections from Mountains and Rivers Without End (1965). This last was the beginning of a project that he was to continue working on until the late 1990s. Much of Snyder's poetry expresses experiences, environments, and insights involved with the work he has done for a living: logger, fire-lookout, steam-freighter crew, translator, carpenter, and itinerant poet, among other things. During his years in Japan, Snyder was also initiated into Shugendo, a highly syncretic ascetic religious cult.

In the early 1960s he traveled for six months through India with Kyger, Ginsberg, and Ginsberg's partner, the poet and actor Peter Orlovsky. Their sojourn took them to Sri Lanka, then to south India, and eventually travelling up into the north. They observed the folkways of the various peoples, went on hikes, stopped at landmarks, temples, burning ghats, monastic caves, and ashrams. As they went, they learned in part through conversations with many Indians and Europeans who could speak English. They visited numerous cities, including Madras, Calcutta, Mumbai, Banaras, Old Delhi and New Delhi, as well as Rishikesh and Hardwar, and Bodh Gaya (where Shakyamuni, the historical Buddha, attained enlightenment). Especially important to Snyder and Ginsberg, in Dharamashala the Dalai Lama met with them and they discussed Buddhist principles and practices.

Snyder and Kyger separated soon after their trip to India, and divorced in 1965.

=== Dharma Bums ===
In the 1950s, Snyder took part in the rise of a strand of Buddhist anarchism emerging from the Beat movement. Snyder was the inspiration for the Japhy Ryder character in Kerouac's novel The Dharma Bums (1958). Snyder had spent considerable time in Japan studying Zen Buddhism, and in 1961 published an essay, "Buddhist Anarchism", where he described the connection he saw between these two traditions, originating in different parts of the world: "The mercy of the West has been social revolution; the mercy of the East has been individual insight into the basic self/void." He advocated "using such means as civil disobedience, outspoken criticism, protest, pacifism, voluntary poverty and even gentle violence" and defended "the right of individuals to smoke ganja, eat peyote, be polygynous, polyandrous or homosexual" which he saw as being banned by "the Judaeo-Capitalist-Christian-Marxist West".

=== Kitkitdizze ===
In 1966, Snyder joined Allen Ginsberg, Richard Baker, future Roshi of the San Francisco Zen Center, and Kriyananda aka Donald J Walters, to buy 100 acres (40 ha) in the San Juan Ridge area of the Sierra-Nevada foothills, north of Nevada City, Northern California. In 1967 Snyder's book The Back Country appeared, again mainly a collection of poems stretching back over about fifteen years. Snyder devoted a section at the end of the book to his translations of eighteen poems by Kenji Miyazawa. In 1970, Kitkitdizze (as he named his portion of the San Juan Ridge property) would become his home. (Snyder borrowed the name from the Miwok word for Chamaebatia foliolosa, a North American species of evergreen shrub used in herbal remedies by them and other indigenous peoples.) By that point, Snyder had already spent the summers of 1967 and 1968 with a group of Japanese back-to-the-land drop-outs known as "the Tribe" on Suwanosejima (a small Japanese island in the East China Sea), where they combed the beaches, gathered edible plants, and fished. On the island, on August 6, 1967, he married Masa Uehara, whom he had met in Osaka a year earlier. In 1968, they moved to California with their infant son, Kai (born April 1968). Their second son, Gen, was born a year later. They were shortly able to move onto the San Juan Ridge property, near the South Yuba River, where they and friends built a house that drew on rural-Japanese and Native-American architectural ideas.

=== Later life and writings ===
Regarding Wave appeared in January 1970, a stylistic departure offering poems that were more emotional, metaphoric, and lyrical. From the late 1960s, the content of Snyder's poetry increasingly had to do with family, friends, and community. He continued to publish poetry throughout the 1970s, much of it reflecting his re-immersion in life on the American continent and his involvement in the back-to-the-land movement in the Sierra foothills. His 1974 book Turtle Island, titled after a Native American name for the North American continent, won a Pulitzer Prize. It also influenced numerous West Coast Generation X writers, including Alex Steffen, Bruce Barcott and Mark Morford. His 1983 book Axe Handles, won an American Book Award. Snyder wrote numerous essays setting forth his views on poetry, culture, social experimentation, and the environment. Many of these were collected in Earth House Hold (1969), The Old Ways (1977), The Real Work (1980), The Practice of the Wild (1990), A Place in Space (1995), and The Gary Snyder Reader (1999). In 1979, Snyder published He Who Hunted Birds in His Father's Village: The Dimensions of a Haida Myth, based on his Reed thesis. Snyder's journals from his travel in India in the mid-1960s appeared in 1983 under the title Passage Through India. In these, his wide-ranging interests in cultures, natural history, religions, social critique, contemporary America, and hands-on aspects of rural life, as well as his ideas on literature, were given full-blown articulation.

In 1986, Snyder became a professor in the writing program at the University of California, Davis. Snyder is now professor emeritus of English.

Snyder was married to Uehara for twenty-two years; the couple divorced in 1989. Snyder married Carole Lynn Koda (October 3, 1947 – June 29, 2006), who would write Homegrown: Thirteen brothers and sisters, a century in America, in 1991, and remained married to her until her death of cancer. She had been born in the third generation of a successful Japanese-American farming family, noted for its excellent rice. She shared Buddhism, extensive travels, and work with Snyder, and performed independent work as a naturalist.

As Snyder's involvement in environmental issues and his teaching grew, he seemed to move away from poetry for much of the 1980s and early 1990s. However, in 1996 he published the complete Mountains and Rivers Without End, a mixture of the lyrical and epic modes celebrating the act of inhabitation on a specific place on the planet. This work was written over a 40-year period. It has been translated into Japanese, French and Russian. In 2004 Snyder published Danger on Peaks, his first collection of new poems in twenty years.

Snyder was awarded the Levinson Prize from the journal Poetry, the American Poetry Society Shelley Memorial Award (1986), was inducted into the American Academy of Arts and Letters (1987), and won the 1997 Bollingen Prize for Poetry and, that same year, the John Hay Award for Nature Writing. Snyder also has the distinction of being the first American to receive the Buddhism Transmission Award (for 1998) from the Japan-based Bukkyo Dendo Kyokai Foundation. For his ecological and social activism, Snyder was named as one of the 100 visionaries selected in 1995 by Utne Reader.

Snyder's life and work were celebrated in John J. Healy's 2010 documentary The Practice of the Wild. The film, which debuted at the 53rd San Francisco International Film Festival, features wide-ranging, running conversations between Snyder and poet, writer and longtime colleague Jim Harrison, filmed mostly on the Hearst Ranch in San Simeon, California. The film also shows archival photographs and film of Snyder's life.

== Work ==
=== Poetics ===
Snyder uses mainly common speech-patterns as the basis for his lines, though his style has been noted for its "flexibility" and the variety of different forms his poems have taken. He typically uses neither conventional meters nor intentional rhyme. "Love and respect for the primitive tribe, honour accorded the Earth, the escape from city and industry into both the past and the possible, contemplation, the communal", such, according to Glyn Maxwell, is the awareness and commitment behind the specific poems.

The author and editor Stewart Brand once wrote: "Gary Snyder's poetry addresses the life-planet identification with unusual simplicity of style and complexity of effect." According to Jody Norton, this simplicity and complexity derives from Snyder's use of natural imagery (geographical formations, flora, and fauna) in his poems. Such imagery can be both sensual at a personal level yet universal and generic in nature. In the 1968 poem "Beneath My Hand and Eye the Distant Hills, Your Body," the author compares the intimate experience of a lover's caress with the mountains, hills, cinder cones, and craters of the Uintah Mountains. Readers become explorers on both a very private level as well as a very public and grand level. A simplistic touch becoming a very complex interaction occurring at multiple levels. This is the effect Snyder intended. In an interview with Ekbert Faas, he states, "There is a direction which is very beautiful, and that's the direction of the organism being less and less locked into itself, less and less locked into its own body structure and its relatively inadequate sense organs, towards a state where the organism can actually go out from itself and share itself with others."

Snyder has always maintained that his personal sensibility arose from his interest in Native Americans and their involvement with nature and knowledge of it; indeed, their ways seemed to resonate with his own. And he has sought something akin to this through Buddhist practices, Yamabushi initiation, and other experiences and involvements. However, since his youth he has been quite literate, and he has written about his appreciation of writers of similar sensibilities, like D. H. Lawrence, William Butler Yeats, and some of the great ancient Chinese poets. William Carlos Williams was another influence, especially on Snyder's earliest published work. Starting in high school, Snyder read and loved the work of Robinson Jeffers, his predecessor in poetry of the landscape of the American West, but whereas Jeffers valued nature over humankind, Snyder saw humankind as part of nature. Snyder commented in interviews, "I have some concerns that I'm continually investigating that tie together biology, mysticism, prehistory, general systems theory". Snyder argues that poets, and humans in general, need to adjust to very long timescales, especially when judging the consequences of their actions. His poetry examines the gap between nature and culture so as to point to ways in which the two can be more closely integrated.

In 2004, receiving the Masaoka Shiki International Haiku Awards Grand Prize, Snyder highlighted traditional ballads and folk songs, Native American songs and poems, William Blake, Walt Whitman, Jeffers, Ezra Pound, Noh drama, Zen aphorisms, Federico García Lorca, and Robert Duncan as significant influences on his poetry, but added, "the influence from haiku and from the Chinese is, I think, the deepest."

=== Romanticism ===
Snyder is among those writers who have sought to dis-entrench conventional thinking about primitive peoples that has viewed them as simple-minded, ignorantly superstitious, brutish, and prone to violent emotionalism. In the 1960s Snyder developed a "neo-tribalist" view akin to the "post-modernist" theory of French Sociologist Michel Maffesoli. The "re-tribalization" of the modern, mass-society world envisioned by Marshall McLuhan, with all of the ominous, dystopian possibilities that McLuhan warned of, subsequently accepted by many modern intellectuals, is not the future that Snyder expects or works toward. Snyder's is a positive interpretation of the tribe and of the possible future. Todd Ensign describes Snyder's interpretation as blending ancient tribal beliefs and traditions, philosophy, physicality, and nature with politics to create his own form of Postmodern environmentalism. Snyder rejects the perspective which portrays nature and humanity in direct opposition to one another. Instead, he chooses to write from multiple viewpoints. He purposely sets out to bring about change on the emotional, physical, and political levels by emphasizing the ecological problems faced by today's society.

=== Beat ===
Snyder is widely regarded as a member of the Beat Generation circle of writers: he was one of the poets that read at the famous Six Gallery event, and was written about in one of Kerouac's most popular novels, The Dharma Bums. Some critics argue that Snyder's connection with the Beats is exaggerated and that he might better be regarded as a part of the San Francisco Renaissance, which developed independently. Snyder himself has some reservations about the label "Beat", but does not appear to have any strong objection to being included in the group. He often talks about the Beats in the first person plural, referring to the group as "we" and "us".

A quotation from a 1974 interview at the University of North Dakota Writers Conference (published in The Beat Vision):

I never did know exactly what was meant by the term 'The Beats', but let's say that the original meeting, association, comradeship of Allen [Ginsberg], myself, Michael [McClure], Lawrence [Ferlinghetti], Philip Whalen, who's not here, Lew Welch, who's dead, Gregory [Corso], for me, to a somewhat lesser extent (I never knew Gregory as well as the others) did embody a criticism and a vision which we shared in various ways, and then went our own ways for many years. Where we began to come really close together again, in the late '60s, and gradually working toward this point, it seems to me, was when Allen began to take a deep interest in Oriental thought and then in Buddhism which added another dimension to our levels of agreement; and later through Allen's influence, Lawrence began to draw toward that; and from another angle, Michael and I after the lapse of some years of contact, found our heads very much in the same place, and it's very curious and interesting now; and Lawrence went off in a very political direction for a while, which none of us had any objection with, except that wasn't my main focus. It's very interesting that we find ourselves so much on the same ground again, after having explored divergent paths; and find ourselves united on this position of powerful environmental concern, critique of the future of the individual state, and an essentially shared poetics, and only half-stated but in the background very powerfully there, a basic agreement on some Buddhist type psychological views of human nature and human possibilities.

Snyder has also commented "The term Beat is better used for a smaller group of writers ... the immediate group around Allen Ginsberg and Jack Kerouac, plus Gregory Corso and a few others. Many of us ... belong together in the category of the San Francisco Renaissance. ... Still, beat can also be defined as a particular state of mind ... and I was in that mind for a while".

== Bibliography ==
- Riprap and Cold Mountain Poems (1959)
- Myths & Texts (1960)
- Six Sections from Mountains and Rivers Without End (1965)
- The Back Country (Fulcrum, 1967)
- Regarding Wave (1969)
- Earth House Hold (1969)
- Smokey the Bear Sutra (1969)
- Turtle Island (1974)
- The Old Ways (1977)
- He Who Hunted Birds in His Father's Village: The Dimensions of a Haida Myth (1979)
- The Real Work: Interviews & Talks 1964–1979 (1980)
- Axe Handles (1983)
- Passage Through India (1983)
- Left Out in the Rain (1988)
- The Practice of the Wild (1990)
- No Nature: New and Selected Poems (1992). Included by Harold Bloom in his list of works constituting the Western Canon.
- A Place in Space (1995)
- narrator of the audio book version of Kazuaki Tanahashi's Moon in a Dewdrop from Dōgen's Shōbōgenzō
- Mountains and Rivers Without End (1996)
- The Geography Of Home (Poetry book)(1999)
- The Gary Snyder Reader: Prose, Poetry, and Translations (1999)
- The High Sierra of California, with Tom Killion (2002)
- Look Out: a Selection of Writings (November 2002)
- Danger on Peaks (2005)
- Back on the Fire: Essays (2007)
- The Selected Letters of Allen Ginsberg and Gary Snyder, 1956–1991 (2009)
- Tamalpais Walking, with Tom Killion (2009)
- The Etiquette of Freedom, with Jim Harrison (2010): film by Will Hearst with book edited by Paul Ebenkamp
- Nobody Home: Writing, Buddhism, and Living in Places, with Julia Martin, Trinity University Press (2014)
- This Present Moment (April 2015)
- Distant Neighbors: The Selected Letters of Wendell Berry and Gary Snyder (May 2015)
- The Great Clod: Notes and Memories on Nature and History in East Asia (March 2016)
- Dooby Lane: Also Known as Guru Road, A Testament Inscribed in Stone Tablets by DeWayne Williams, with Peter Goin (October 2016)
- Collected Poems (The Library of America, 2022) ISBN 9781598537215
- Essential Prose (The Library of America, 2025)

== General sources ==
- Charters, Ann (ed.). The Portable Beat Reader. Penguin Books. New York. 1992. ISBN 0-670-83885-3 (hc); ISBN 0-14-015102-8 (pbk)
- Hunt, Anthony. "Genesis, Structure, and Meaning in Gary Snyder's Mountains and Rivers Without End" Univ. of Nevada Press. 2004. ISBN 0-87417-545-3
- Knight, Arthur Winfield. Ed. The Beat Vision (1987) Paragon House. ISBN 0-913729-40-X; ISBN 0-913729-41-8 (pbk)
- Kyger, Joanne. Strange Big Moon: The Japan and India Journals: 1960–1964 (2000) North Atlantic Books. ISBN 978-1-55643-337-5
- Smith, Eric Todd. Reading Gary Snyder's Mountains and Rivers Without End (1999) Boise State University. ISBN 978-0-88430-141-7
- Snyder, Gary. The Politics of Ethnopoetics (1975) Snyder essay A Place in Space
- Snyder, Gary. 1980. The Real Work: Interviews & Talks 1964–1979. New Directions, New York. ISBN 0-8112-0761-7 (hbk); ISBN 0-8112-0760-9 (pbk)
- Stirling, Isabel. Zen Pioneer: The Life & Works of Ruth Fuller Sasaki (2006) Shoemaker & Hoard. ISBN 978-1-59376-110-3
- Suiter, John. Poets on the Peaks (2002) Counterpoint. ISBN 1-58243-148-5; ISBN 1-58243-294-5 (pbk)
- Western Literature Association. Updating the Literary West (1997) Texas Christian University Press. ISBN 978-0-87565-175-0
