= Strawberry, Marin County, California =

Strawberry
- Census-designated place
- Location in Marin County and the state of California

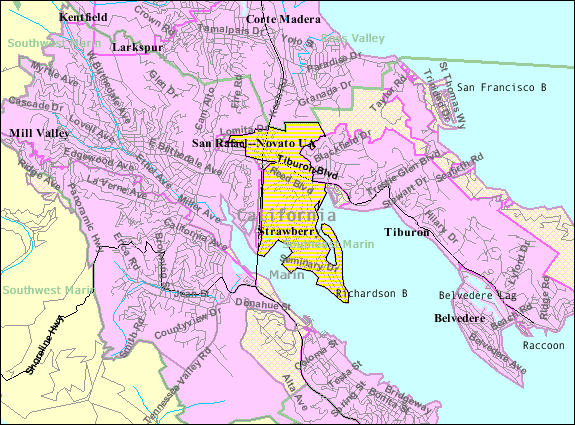
- Strawberry CDP, California (orange)

- Location in the United States
- Coordinates: 37°53′49″N 122°30′32″W
- Country: United States
- State: California
- County: Marin; 3rd District
- Established: 1949

Government
  - Type: Recreation District
  - County Board: District 3 Stephanie Moulton-Peters
  - State Senate: Mike McGuire (D)
  - Assembly: Damon Connolly (D)
  - U. S. Congress: Jared Huffman (D)

Area
  - Total: 1.912 sq mi (4.95 km^{2})
  - Land: 1.330 sq mi (3.44 km^{2})
  - Water: 0.582 sq mi (1.51 km^{2}) 30.44%
- Elevation: 223 ft (68 m)

Population (2020)
  - Total: 5,447
  - Density: 4,095.5/sq mi (1,581.3/km^{2})
- Time zone: UTC-8 (PST)
  - Summer (DST): UTC-7 (PDT)
- ZIP code: 94941
- Area codes: 415/628
- FIPS code: 06-75315
- GNIS feature ID: 1867062
- Website: strawberry.marin.org

Strawberry is a census-designated place (CDP) and an unincorporated district of Marin County, California, United States. It shares a ZIP code (94941) with Mill Valley (hence, addresses in Strawberry are listed as "Mill Valley") and falls within its school districts; however, it is considered within the sphere of influence of the town of Tiburon. It is largely separated from Mill Valley by U.S. Route 101. Its population was 5,447 at the 2020 census.

== Geography ==
Strawberry is located in southern Marin County at 37°53′49″N 122°30′32″W. Occupying Strawberry Point that extends into Richardson Bay, it is bordered to the east by Tiburon, to the west by Mill Valley, and to the north by unincorporated Alto. To the south, across the west arm of Richardson Bay, are Marin City and Sausalito. U.S. Route 101 forms the western edge of Strawberry, with the highway leading north 6 miles (10 km) to San Rafael, the county seat, and south 8 miles (13 km) over the Golden Gate Bridge to San Francisco. (A portion of unincorporated Mill Valley west of the freeway is sometimes included in the overall Strawberry CDP.)

According to the United States Census Bureau, the Strawberry CDP has a total area of 1.9 square miles (4.9 km^{2}), of which 1.3 square miles (3.4 km^{2}) are land and 0.6 square miles (1.6 km^{2}), or 30.44%, are water. Aramburu Island is separated from Strawberry by Richardson Bay.

Ring Mountain, holding significant evidence of Native American habitation, dominates the high ground east of Strawberry on the Tiburon Peninsula.

Strawberry Spit was once the gathering site of harbor seals, who previously lived and fished here, but after development on the spit began in the 1980s they left.

Strawberry is the site of a major transfer bus stop for Golden Gate Transit.

== Demographics ==
Historical population
Census	Pop.	Note	%±
1990	4,377		—
2000	5,302		21.1%
2010	5,393		1.7%
2020	5,447		1.0%
U.S. Decennial Census; 1860–1870 1880-1890; 1900 1910 1920; 1930 1940 1950; 1960 1970 1980; 1990 2000 2010; 2020

Strawberry first appeared as a census designated place in the 1990 U.S. census.

=== Racial and ethnic composition ===
Strawberry CDP, Marin County, California – Racial and ethnic composition Note: the US Census treats Hispanic/Latino as an ethnic category. This table excludes Latinos from the racial categories and assigns them to a separate category. Hispanics/Latinos may be of any race.
Race / Ethnicity (NH = Non-Hispanic)	Pop 2000	Pop 2010	Pop 2020	% 2000	% 2010	% 2020
White alone (NH)	4,267	4,106	3,747	80.48%	76.14%	68.79%
Black or African American alone (NH)	99	112	70	1.87%	2.08%	1.29%
Native American or Alaska Native alone (NH)	10	11	11	0.19%	0.20%	0.20%
Asian alone (NH)	482	589	768	9.09%	10.92%	14.10%
Native Hawaiian or Pacific Islander alone (NH)	7	16	10	0.13%	0.30%	0.18%
Other race alone (NH)	27	17	29	0.51%	0.32%	0.53%
Mixed race or Multiracial (NH)	157	190	319	2.96%	3.52%	5.86%
Hispanic or Latino (any race)	253	352	493	4.77%	6.53%	9.05%
Total	5,302	5,393	5,447	100.00%	100.00%	100.00%

=== 2020 ===
The 2020 United States census reported that Strawberry had a population of 5,447. The population density was 4,095.5 inhabitants per square mile (1,581.3/km^{2}). The racial makeup of Strawberry was 70.6% White, 1.3% African American, 0.6% Native American, 14.2% Asian, 0.2% Pacific Islander, 3.1% from other races, and 10.0% from two or more races. Hispanic or Latino of any race were 9.1% of the population.

The census reported that 98.0% of the population lived in households, 2.0% lived in non-institutionalized group quarters, and no one was institutionalized.

There were 2,506 households, out of which 25.6% included children under the age of 18, 40.8% were married-couple households, 5.5% were cohabiting couple households, 34.4% had a female householder with no partner present, and 19.2% had a male householder with no partner present. 39.5% of households were one person, and 20.2% were one person aged 65 or older. The average household size was 2.13. There were 1,332 families (53.2% of all households).

The age distribution was 20.0% under the age of 18, 4.3% aged 18 to 24, 22.9% aged 25 to 44, 29.5% aged 45 to 64, and 23.2% who were 65 years of age or older. The median age was 47.0 years. For every 100 females, there were 87.6 males.

There were 2,714 housing units at an average density of 2,040.6 units per square mile (787.9 units/km^{2}), of which 2,506 (92.3%) were occupied. Of these, 40.6% were owner-occupied, and 59.4% were occupied by renters.

In 2023, the US Census Bureau estimated that the median household income was $144,130, and the per capita income was $101,369. About 8.1% of families and 9.9% of the population were below the poverty line.

=== 2010 ===
At the 2010 census 5,393 people, 2,510 households, and 1,307 families resided in the CDP. The population density was 4,094.9 inhabitants per square mile (1,581.0/km^{2}). There were 2,729 housing units at an average density of 2,048.4 per square mile (790.9/km^{2}). The racial makeup of the CDP was 80.2% White (76.1% non-Hispanic), 10.9% Asian, 2.1% African American, 0.3% Native American, 0.3% Pacific Islander, 1.8% from other races, and 4.3% from two or more races. 6.5% of the population was Hispanic or Latino of any race.

The census reported that 95.4% of the population lived in households, 4.5% lived in non-institutionalized group quarters, and 0.1% were institutionalized.

Of the 2,510 households 25.5% had children under the age of 18 living in them, 41.0% were opposite-sex married couples living together, 8.0% had a female householder with no husband present, and 3.1% had a male householder with no wife present. 4.6% of households were unmarried opposite-sex partnerships and 0.8% were same-sex married couples or partnerships. 40.6% of households were one person and 14.3% were one person aged 65 or older. The average household size was 2.05 and the average family size was 2.80.

The age distribution was 19.9% under the age of 18, 4.2% aged 18 to 24, 27.7% aged 25 to 44, 30.8% aged 45 to 64, and 17.5% 65 or older. The median age was 44.0 years. For every 100 females, there were 90.8 males. For every 100 females age 18 and over, there were 86.5 males.

There were 2,729 housing units of which 39.2% were owner-occupied and 60.8% were occupied by renters. The homeowner vacancy rate was 1.4%; the rental vacancy rate was 2.4%. 44.2% of the population lived in owner-occupied housing units and 51.2% lived in rental housing units.

== Educational institutions ==
Almost all of Strawberry is in the Mill Valley Elementary School District, while a portion is in the Reed Union Elementary School District. All of it is in the Tamalpais Union High School District, and the Marin Community College District. Strawberry is in the attendance areas for Mill Valley Middle School and Tamalpais High School.

Strawberry is home to one public school, Strawberry Point School (K–5), of the Mill Valley District.

Golden Gate Baptist Theological Seminary closed its Strawberry campus in 2016 after many decades of operation.

=== Strawberry Point School ===
Strawberry Point School opened in 1952. Starting in 1969, 6th, 7th and 8th grade students attended Mill Valley Middle School. Strawberry Point School closed in 1990 and reopened in 2000. Huey Lewis attended Strawberry Point School in the 1950s, where he skipped second grade.

The song "Mill Valley", recorded in 1970 and released on the album Miss Abrams and the Strawberry Point 4th Grade Class, became a nationwide hit.

=== Golden Gate Baptist Theological Seminary ===
The site of the Golden Gate Baptist Theological Seminary on Strawberry Point, now known as the Seminary at Strawberry, was considered for the headquarters for the United Nations. This was because in the 1940s when the UN was established in San Francisco, Strawberry was undeveloped. It was seen as a tranquil and peaceful setting. New York City was eventually chosen.

The site is currently occupied by Olivet University, also a theological institution. Olivet has approximately 100, mostly international students.

== Government ==
Strawberry is unincorporated, receiving most of its general government services from Marin County. It is in the 3rd Supervisorial District and, in 2024, is represented by Supervisor Stephanie Moulton-Peters.

The Strawberry Recreation District provides limited services in the area, including recreation facilities. It has an elected board of five directors. District boundaries do not exactly match those of the CDP.

Strawberry is in the Southern Marin Fire Protection District, which also serves Tamalpais Valley, Homestead Valley, Almonte, Alto, part of the Town of Tiburon, and, since 2004, the City of Sausalito. Prior to the creation of the District in 1999, Strawberry was in the Alto-Richardson Fire Protection District.

Strawberry shares a ZIP code (94941) with Mill Valley (hence, addresses in Strawberry are listed as "Mill Valley") and falls within its school districts. The city of Tiburon once considered Strawberry within its sphere of influence, but in 2004 the Marin Local Agency Formation Commission "concluded that gradual annexation of Strawberry would be unlikely."
