= I Want It All Now! =

1978 American documentary TV special

- Genre: Documentary
- Written by: Joseph DeCola; Edwin Newman; Jean Sprain Wilson
- Directed by: Joseph DeCola
- Presented by: Edwin Newman
- Music by: Rita Abrams
- Opening theme: "End of the Rainbow" by Rita Abrams
- Country of origin: United States
- Original language: English

Production
- Producer: Joseph DeCola
- Production location: Marin County, California
- Cinematography: Stephen Lighthill
- Editors: Frank J. DeMeo; Irwin Graf; Donald Macoun
- Running time: 50 minutes
- Production company: NBC News

Original release
- Network: NBC
- Release: July 20, 1978

I Want It All Now! is a 1978 American documentary television special produced by NBC News about Marin County, California and the hedonistic and narcissistic lifestyle ostensibly characteristic of the affluent county. The program also explored the popularity of the human potential movement and new age ideologies in Marin, social problems such as suicide, alcoholism, and divorce associated with the Marin lifestyle, and the effect that this had on children growing up there. The program presented Marin as at the forefront of trends that were becoming more predominant in the larger American society in the late 1970s, representing a snapshot of the "Me decade" and a lifestyle that a few years later would be termed "yuppie".

== Synopsis ==
The program starts with a cold open featuring a woman receiving a nude massage and being stroked with peacock feathers from two also-nude male masseurs, as well as being indulged in a hot tub. The documentary is presented with a running narrative by newscaster Edwin Newman and is roughly divided into three parts. The first introduces Marin County, its wealth, scenery, and social indicators such as an its suicide and alcoholism rates. The second part focuses on the human potential and new age movements in Marin, which the documentary ties to a larger culture of narcissism. The last part focuses on the effects that the focus of parents on self and high rates of divorce have on children growing up on this community.

The film interviews a number of Marin community members: the Gulko family, presented as a "portrait of a successful divorce"; several individuals whose professions bring them into contact with problems in the community, including a judge, a pharmacist, several therapists, and a schoolteacher; several new age and self-help teachers, which the program refers to as "gurus"; a woman whose pursuit of self-realization and personal happiness had led her to partially abandon her role as mother to her young children; and several school children who are affected by divorce. Some of the more notable interview subjects include Cyra McFadden, whose novel The Serial initially brought national attention to Marin County, and George Leonard, an aikido master and founding figure in the human potential movement, who is critical of some of the more narcissistic directions the movement had taken.

== Reception ==
The documentary was received negatively in Marin County by residents who felt it sensationalized and misrepresented the community. The Marin County alternative weekly Pacific Sun published a point-by-point rebuttal of claims raised in the program, arguing, among other things, that key scenes were staged, that interviews were deceptively edited, statistics cited in the program were misreported, and that the lifestyle presented in the program represented only a small minority of the Marin County population. The Pacific Sun article was later read into the Congressional Record by Marin County Congressman John L. Burton. Barbara Boxer, who was on the Marin County Board of Supervisors at the time, filed complaints with the Federal Communications Commission (FCC) and the National News Council over what she felt was misrepresentation of the community by a national news agency. The FCC complaint was withdrawn, however the National News Council, a watchdog group without enforcement powers, found that the program was "journalistically flawed at essential points", though it rejected complaints that the program was "vicious, distorted or irresponsible."

NBC News President Lester Crystal responded that the program was "substantially without error," but that there were "a couple of places where something might have been made clearer." Edwin Newman also defended the veracity of reporting by NBC News, stating, "We were not offering a view of Marin County as a whole....We pointed that out on the program more than once. But it seemed to us that what we saw did apply to a sufficiently large number of Marinites to make it worth reporting."

=== Awards ===
In 1980, Rita Abrams received a News and Documentary Emmy Award in the category of "Outstanding Achievement in a Craft in News and Documentary Programming: Music" for her score for the documentary. Abrams was a long-time Marin County musician and former schoolteacher, best known for the 1970 minor hit "Mill Valley", which she recorded with her fourth grade class.

== Legacy ==
Along with the novel The Serial and its film adaptation Serial, the program cemented the popular image of Marin County in American culture, creating long-lasting stereotypes about the county. In particular, it created the association of Marin County with hot tubs and peacock feathers. The stereotype was persistent enough that after former Marin resident John Walker Lindh was captured in 2001 in Afghanistan after joining the Taliban, former US president George H. W. Bush referred to him as a "poor, misguided, Marin County hot-tubber". After receiving criticism for the remark, Bush responded, "I apologize. I am chastened and will never use 'hot tub' and 'Marin County' in the same sentence again."

A retrospective look at I Want It All Now! published in the Marin Independent Journal noted some similarities between the Marin County of 2019 and the Marin of 40 years earlier that was presented in the program. The county was still a place of great physical beauty, with a wealthy population. Housing prices were still very high, the number of therapists per capita were the highest in California, and rates of alcoholism, suicide, and divorce were still above average. However, Marin's reputation for leisure and a "loose swinging lifestyle" had given way to "stress", "hyper-intensive parenting, frazzled dual-income families, [and] exhausting commutes". The article notes, "In many ways, we haven't progressed from how we were depicted in 'I Want It All Now.' But what's missing is our sense of fun, our sense of humor."

Brad Gulko, one of the children interviewed in several places in the program re-emerged years later under unusual circumstances. In 2020, it was found that Bob Gulko was not Brad Gulko's biological father, but rather Quincy Fortier, a fertility doctor who had impregnated hundreds of women under the guise of impregnating women with their husband's sperm. Brad Gulko, now a computational biologist and genomicist, was featured prominently in the Netflix documentary Baby God about the Fortier fertility fraud case.
