= Mill Valley (song) =

Single by Miss Abrams and the Strawberry Point Third Grade Class

from the album Miss Abrams and the Strawberry Point 4th Grade Class
- B-side: "The Happiest Day of My Life"
- Written: December 25, 1969
- Released: 1970
- Genre: Pop; Children's
- Length: 3:01
- Label: Reprise; Pye
- Songwriter(s): Rita Abrams
- Producer(s): Erik Jacobsen; Rita Abrams

Miss Abrams and the Strawberry Point Third Grade Class singles chronology
"Mill Valley" (1970)	"Buildin' a Heaven on Earth" (1970)

Music video
- "Mill Valley" on YouTube

"Mill Valley" is a song written and composed by American singer-songwriter and teacher Rita Abrams, and performed by her and the students in the third grade who were attending Strawberry Point Elementary School during the 1969–1970 school year, initially billed under Miss Abrams and the Strawberry Point Third Grade Class. Following the song's success, the label had requested that Abrams record an album with the class, which was named Miss Abrams and the Strawberry Point 4th Grade Class.

The song peaked at number 90 on the Billboard Hot 100, as well as number 5 in the adult contemporary chart.

== Background ==
In early 1970, Rita Abrams, a singer-songwriter who had then been teaching at Strawberry Point Elementary School in the city of Mill Valley, located in the U.S. state of California, had met record producer Erik Jacobsen, who requested and received a tape recording of "Mill Valley" after Abrams informed him of the song she had just written that past Christmas. While recording her kindergarten students singing the song in the school with the assistance of Tommy Heath, Abrams received feedback that the song was "unlistenable," so they later borrowed a third grade class and recorded the vocals professionally in Wally Heider Studios. Jacobsen eventually contacted Reprise Records around May, who put a rush release on the single.

== Chart performance ==
The song debuted at number 5 on Billboard's Bubbling Under Hot 100 for the week ending July 11, 1970, and spent 3 weeks on that chart before debuting at number 92 on the Billboard Hot 100 for the week of August 1, where it spent another 3 weeks, peaking at number 90. "Mill Valley" also performed well on Billboard's adult contemporary chart, peaking at number 5.

== Reception and reviews ==
Life magazine covered the story, and Annie Leibovitz took photos of the class for Rolling Stone.

"Mill Valley" was described as an "off beat, delightful salute to the California locale," an "important chart item," and a "[potential] left field giant" by a writer for Billboard magazine, who furthermore compared it to Frank Sinatra's "High Hopes," likely due to its children's singing choir and similar song arrangement. A writer for Record World wrote of the track, "Cute as can be, here is a teacher and her class singing the praises of their town. All kids should have teachers like this."

Reviewer Greg Adams of AllMusic, called the song "enchanting," "heaping innocent charm," "well-crafted," saying of the song, "Only the most hard-hearted cynic could find no enjoyment in this minor masterpiece of early-'70s soft pop," going on to compare Abrams' "clear, pretty, girl-next-door voice" to Lynn Ahrens of Schoolhouse Rock!, Karen of The Carpenters, and the Sesame Street theme song.

Author Kim Simpson highlights the song's "soothing, innocent-sounding voices" and the "childlike simplicity of how it became a hit," and furthermore suggests that the song "stirred up a craving among American listeners for the voices of children," in her 2011 book Early '70s Radio — The American Format Revolution, while author Joyce Kleiner highlights the song's "sweet and sentimental lyrics" in her 2014 book Legendary Locals of Mill Valley, California.

== Aftermath and legacy ==
Later in 1970, the children in the class were invited to perform the national anthem for the San Francisco 49ers at Kezar Stadium. Kraft Foods' Jell-O would later offer them an opportunity to make a commercial, which Abrams rejected. Abrams also appeared on To Tell the Truth, and performed for The Steve Allen and Smothers Brothers shows at some point, but was unable to be accompanied by the children.

In 2010, the 40-year anniversary of the song, KQED interviewed Abrams and several of the former pupils about the song.

In 2015, Terry McGovern hosted an entire show around the song to celebrate its 45th anniversary, including an audio-visual component about the song and its history, with photos, interviews and videos. Later in the year on August 23, Abrams hosted a community event in Throckmorton Theatre for the same reason.

In 2020, the song's 50-year anniversary, Mill Valley City Council honored Abrams' work for bringing attention to the city across the nation and around the world. Also that year, Dr. Kimberly Berman, superintendent for the Mill Valley School District, hosted a virtual celebration of the song's anniversary, interviewing Abrams as well as a couple of the former third-grade students.

== Music video ==
On July 4, 1970, a music video, produced by Warner Brothers and directed by Francis Ford Coppola, was released.

== Personnel ==
As far as known, here's who performed on the track:

- Rita Abrams (singer, piano)
- Greg Berman (backup vocals)
- Bruce Bennett (backup vocals)
- Cecilia Bogren (backup vocals)
- Brian Friedman (backup vocals)
- Cindy Koehn (backup vocals)
- Cissy Larsen (backup vocals)
- Erin MacLean (backup vocals)
- Jerry Norton (backup vocals)
- Kelly O'Connor (backup vocals)
- Kathy Trudell (backup vocals)
- Maria Verhaaren (backup vocals)
- Scott Victor (backup vocals)
- John Yamanaka (backup vocals)
