= Prion Humour Classics =

Series of small-format hardback novels

Prion Humour Classics are a series of small-format hardback novels published by Prion Books in the UK published by Barry Winkleman.

Title	Author	Introduction by	Published	Originally published
Augustus Carp, Esq.	Henry Howarth Bashford	John Letts	Oct 2000	1924
Seven Men and Two Others	Max Beerbohm	Nigel Williams	Jan 2001	1950
How to Travel Incognito	Ludwig Bemelmans	Robert Wernick	April 2001	1952
Mapp and Lucia	E. F. Benson	Stephen Pile	Feb 2001	1931
The Freaks of Mayfair	E. F. Benson	Brian Masters	Sep 2001	1916
Accustomed as I Am	Basil Boothroyd	Alistair Sampson	Jul 2001	1975
The Marsh-Marlowe Letters	Craig Brown		Nov 2001	1984
How Steeple Sinderby Wanderers Won the F.A. Cup	J. L. Carr		Nov 1999	1975
Diary of a Provincial Lady	E. M. Delafield	Jilly Cooper	Feb 2000	1930
The Papers of A.J. Wentworth B.A.	H. F. Ellis	Miles Kington	Aug 2000	1949
Squire Haggard's Journal	Michael Green	Michael Green	Sep 2000	1975
The Diary of a Nobody	George and Weedon Grossmith	William Trevor	Jan 2001	1892
Three Men in a Boat	Jerome K Jerome	Nigel Williams	Feb 2000	1889
Mrs Caudle's Curtain Lectures	Douglas Jerrold	Peter Ackroyd	Jul 2000	1846
The Unspeakable Skipton	Pamela Hansford Johnson	Ruth Rendell	Jan 2002	1959
Sunshine Sketches of a Little Town	Stephen Leacock		Mar 2000	1912
No Mother to Guide Her	Anita Loos	Kathy Lette	Jan 2000	1961
Here's Luck	Lennie Lower	James Scanlon	April 2001	1929
The Biography of a Cad	A. G. Macdonnell	Simon Hoggart	Jan 2001	1939
The Serial	Cyra McFadden		Apr 2000	1977
The Eliza Stories	Barry Pain	Terry Jones	Feb 2002	1900
The World of S J Perelman	S. J. Perelman	Woody Allen	May 2000	
The World of Simon Raven	Simon Raven	Anthony Blond	Jul 2002	
How to Do and Say in England	Anthony Robertson		Oct 2001	1936
The Education of Hyman Kaplan	Leo Rosten	Howard Jacobson	Mar 2000	1937
The Return of Hyman Kaplan	Leo Rosten		May 2000	1959
The Unrest-Cure and other Tales	Saki	Will Self	Jun 2001	
The English Gentleman	Douglas Sutherland	Iain Moncreiffe	Mar 2001	1978
My Life and Hard Times	James Thurber	Clifton Fadiman	Jul 2000	1933
A Touch of Daniel	Peter Tinniswood	David Nobbs	Nov 2001	1969
Cannibalism in the Cars	Mark Twain	Roy Blount Jr.	Mar 2000	
A Melon for Ecstasy	John Fortune and John Wells	John Fortune	Jan 2002	1971
