= Rita Abrams =

- Born: August 30, 1943 (age 82)
- Origin: Cleveland, Ohio, U.S.
- Genres: Pop; folk
- Occupations: Musician, songwriter
- Instruments: Guitar; piano; vocals
- Years active: 1970–present
- Labels: Reprise; A&M
- Website: ritaabrams.com

Rita Abrams (born August 30, 1943) is an American songwriter, performer and writer. Her song "Mill Valley", recorded with children at the school where she was teaching, was released under the name Miss Abrams and the Strawberry Point Fourth Grade Class in 1970, becoming a Billboard Hot 100 and Easy Listening hit and being nominated for a Grammy. In 1980, she won an Emmy for the music for I Want It All Now!, an NBC documentary about life in Marin County, California.

== Life and career ==
She was born in Cleveland, Ohio, where she attended Cleveland Heights High School and studied classical piano and music theory at the Cleveland Institute of Music. She attended college in Cincinnati and at Simmons College in Boston, and graduated with a Bachelor of Arts degree in English literature from the University of Michigan. Boston University granted her a fellowship for a Masters Program in Special Education, after which she taught for two years in Boston. There, she also started to write verse and song lyrics, and sang with the Three Faces of Eve, an all-girl rock and roll band.

In 1968, she moved to California and secured a teaching post at Strawberry Point Elementary School in Mill Valley. On Christmas Day 1969, she wrote a song about the town for her kindergarten class to sing. It was heard by record producer Erik Jacobsen, who recorded Abrams with the children from the third grade class at the school, and took it to Warner Bros. Records where the label management "guys in suits stood up and gave it a standing ovation". Released in June 1970 on the Reprise label, the record reached #90 on the Billboard pop chart and #5 on the Easy Listening (Now Billboard Adult Contemporary) chart. Promotional photos of the singers were taken by Annie Leibovitz, and Abrams appeared on several networked TV shows and in national magazines, while also turning down an opportunity to advertise Jell-O. A performance for the Mill Valley Fourth of July celebration was filmed by Francis Ford Coppola. The follow-up single, "Buildin' a Heaven on Earth", was written by singer/songwriter Norman Greenbaum.

Following the success of "Mill Valley", Abrams, Jacobsen and the children recorded and released an album, entitled Miss Abrams and the Strawberry Point 4th Grade Class as the children had by then moved up a grade. According to reviewer Greg Adams, "Only the most hard-hearted cynic could find no enjoyment in this minor masterpiece of early-'70s soft pop."

Abrams then left teaching to pursue a career in music and verse writing, which subsequently included children's records and novelty songs, many in collaboration with Dr. Elmo (Elmo Shropshire), commercials, and greeting cards. She won a national Emmy in 1980 for writing the music for I Want It All Now, a documentary about life in Marin County, and a regional Emmy in 1992 for Classic Stories for Children. In 1981 she published a book, At Your Age You're Having a What? The Advantages of Middle-Aged Motherhood. She also created a Las Vegas musical revue based on John Gray's book, Men Are From Mars, Women Are From Venus, and a show about life in Marin County, For Whom The Bridge Tolls.

She remained a resident of Mill Valley at least until 2014, when it was reported that she was moving out of the area.

== Discography ==
=== Singles ===
- "Mill Valley" / "Happiest Day of My Life", Reprise 0928, US #90, US AC #5, 1970
- "Buildin' A Heaven on Earth" / "This Time of Life", Reprise 0971, 1970
- "Wonder" / "Floating Away", A&M 1263, 1971
- "Green Grass" / "Sweet Summertime", Reprise 1098, 1972
- "I Never Asked" / "Wonder", Reprise 1136, 1972
- "America (Let's Get Started Again)" / "Running in the Green Grass", Reprise 1322, 1975

=== Albums ===
- Miss Abrams and the Strawberry Point 4th Grade Class, Reprise MS 2098, 1972
