= Silva Island =

Peninsula in San Francisco Bay, California

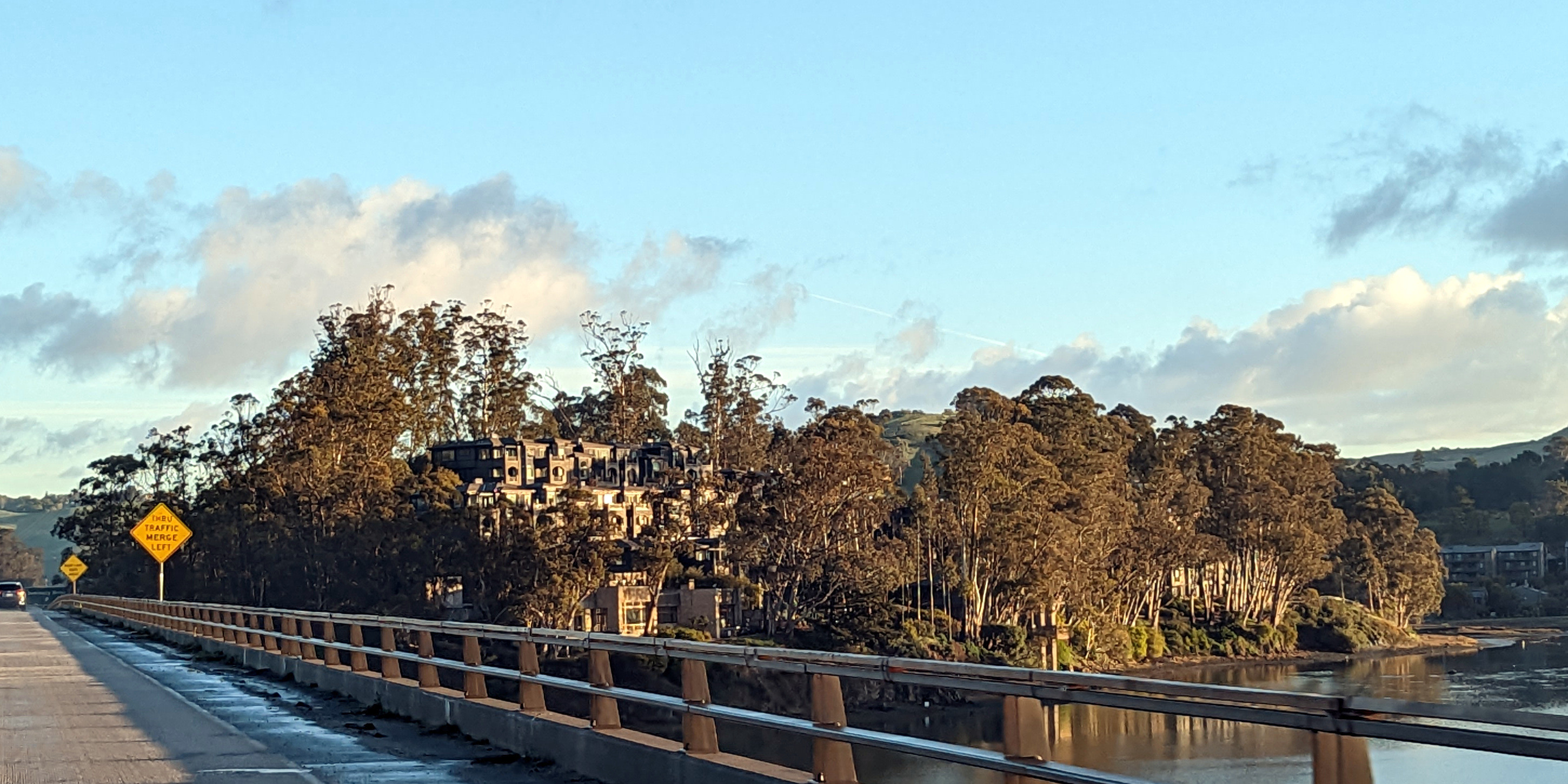
- Silva Island in March 2023, as seen looking north along U.S. Route 101.

- Location within San Francisco Bay Area Location within California Location within the United States

Geography
- Location: Northern California
- Coordinates: 37°53′15″N 122°30′54″W
- Adjacent to: San Francisco Bay
- Highest elevation: 79 ft (24.1 m)

Administration
- United States
- State: California
- County: Marin

Silva Island (also De Silva Island) is a peninsula in Richardson Bay, an arm of San Francisco Bay. It is part of Strawberry, an unincorporated Census-designated place in Marin County, California. Part of the original land mass was removed in 1930 to accommodate the north end of the Richardson Bay Bridge. It is now 0.25 miles (400 m) long with 32 residential units and a recreation center.

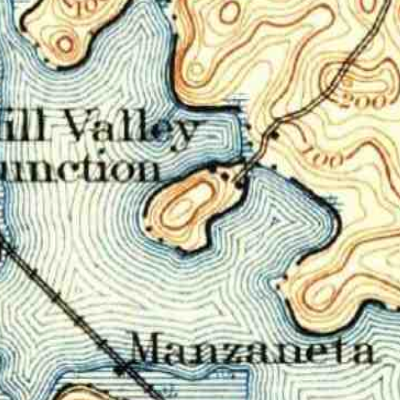
USGS survey map (1:62500 scale) from 1897.

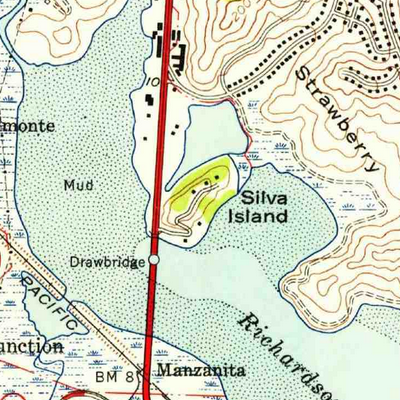
USGS survey map (1:24000 scale) from 1954.

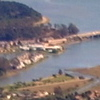
An aerial photo taken in 2013, looking toward the east.
