= The Serial =

1977 satirical novel by Cyra McFadden

- First edition cover
- Author: Cyra McFadden
- Language: English
- Subject: Marin County lifestyle
- Genre: Satire
- Publisher: Knopf
- Publication date: May 1977
- Publication place: United States
- Media type: Print (spiral bound)
- Pages: 111
- ISBN: 978-0394733616

The Serial: A Year in the Life of Marin County (often referred to simply as The Serial) is a satirical novel by Cyra McFadden about life in 1970s Marin County, California, a suburban, affluent county located just north of San Francisco. The novel's characters have been described as "self-obsessives who take 'getting in touch with themselves' to the heights of caricature."

Beginning in 1976, chapters of The Serial appeared in Marin's alternative weekly newspaper, the Pacific Sun, and in the San Francisco Chronicle. The chapters were collected in book form by Knopf, and published as a spiral notebook in 1977. The Serial was popular at the time of its publication but has since gone out of print in the United States. It was republished in the UK, first as a hardback by Prion Humour Classics in 2000, and later as an e-book by Apostrophe Books in 2012.

A film version of the novel, titled Serial, was released in 1980. It starred Martin Mull, Tuesday Weld and Sally Kellerman, and met with limited critical praise.

== Plot summary ==
The Serial is divided into 52 short chapters. It is a weekly chronicle of the lives of a group of Marin County residents, most of whom are in their mid-to-late thirties and early forties. Although the novel contains many characters and episodes, the plot centers on a Mill Valley couple, Kate and Harvey Holroyd, who are undergoing marital problems as they each seek self-fulfillment. The storyline spans a one-year period roughly between the heyday of the 1960s-70s counterculture and the advent of what was known as "Yuppie" culture. McFadden later insisted she "was scrupulously careful to avoid putting any real people into the book", but she does make numerous references to actual locations (restaurants, stores, streets) in 1970s Marin County.

While there are elements of soap opera in the novel, the tone is comedic and satiric rather than melodramatic. The characters' interests include New Age ideas, transcendental meditation, consciousness-raising, and rebirthing. They employ unconventional and arguably lax child-rearing techniques, and embrace then-current fads such as fern bars, Zen jogging, scream therapy, and macramé. Wife swapping and open marriage are common as are frequent divorces. Many aspects of the human potential movement are satirized, among them Werner Erhard's est self-improvement program, the Fischer-Hoffman Process, and Jonathan Livingston Seagull. Radical feminism and Sierra Club membership are seemingly ubiquitous; and kids are sent to free-form summer camps offering survival training and "Spontaneous Rap Sessions".

== Background ==
The genesis of The Serial can be traced back to 1974 when San Francisco writer Armistead Maupin provided the Pacific Sun with several episodes of a fictionalized saga titled "The Serial" about local neighborhood hipsters. When Maupin left to work on Tales of the City, there was an opening in the newspaper for a similar series. In 1975, McFadden submitted a free-lance article to the Sun. She satirized a café named "Eats" "nestled in the industrial area in Mill Valley behind an amphetamine factory, that featured canned peas and Orange Nehi on its wine list." Her article was a success, and the Sun asked her to expand it into a fictional series, to be titled "The Serial". She ended up writing 32 short chapters that became the weekly newspaper's most popular feature. Knopf learned of the series and opted to publish it in book form. They commissioned 20 more chapters from McFadden to create a full 52-week "Year in the Life of Marin County".

The California subculture that the novel satirizes was also targeted by author Tom Wolfe in an August 1976 essay, "The Me Decade and the Third Great Awakening", published in New York magazine.

Characters in The Serial speak using a distinctive jargon or lexicon, saying words and phrases like "flash on" (a phrasal verb meaning "to have a sudden insight about" as in "I really flashed on that"), and "Really" (to signify assent). In disagreeing with Harvey about just how open their open marriage should be, Kate felt that they "hadn't finalized the parameters of their own interface". McFadden termed herself "an incurable eavesdropper", who began jotting down phrases she overheard after moving to Marin with her husband and daughter in the early 1970s.

In the original chapter installments in the Pacific Sun, black-and-white illustrations by Tom Cervenak accompanied the text. The illustrations were included in the spiral notebook published by Knopf, and in all subsequent editions.

== Reception ==
The book received widespread praise and went through multiple printings. Charles Michener of Newsweek magazine called The Serial "one of the most delicious acts of cultural sabotage since Mark Twain". Some reviewers expressed their praise using lingo from the novel, for example, Diane White wrote in The Boston Globe that the novel "is an extraordinarily funny social satire. I mean it's a real trip. It just blew me away."

In The New York Times review, John Leonard labeled The Serial "hilarious" and described the California "dynamic" it depicts as rather scary: "[W]hat a terrible burden it must be, having always to be with it no matter what comes down, whether it's a 'Mongolian hot‐pot complete with those little mesh dippers from Cost Plus you passed around so each guest could fish out his own individual bits of bok choy' or adultery and orgonomy, off the wall or in the pits." Among the eccentric characters he singles out are "Martha, who can't 'get behind ironing boards.' And Brian, who is 'heavily into the perfect tan.' And Angela, who is 'so nonphysical she wouldn't even read hardbound books.'"

In his review, George Will wrote:

The Serial is a comedy about moderns struggling to keep their chins above the rising sea of their status anxieties. It is a Baedeker guide to a desolate region, the monochromatic inner landscape of persons whose life is consumption, of goods and salvations, and whose moral makeup is the curious modern combination of hedonism and earnestness.

In 1978, NBC aired a made-for-TV documentary titled I Want It All Now! about the excesses of the affluent Marin lifestyle. The area's residents did not appreciate being turned into objects of national ridicule, and there was a backlash against McFadden (who was interviewed in the documentary) and her book. She received death threats; merchants refused her business; and her home was pelted with eggs. When a new Mill Valley sewage treatment facility was about to be opened, people wrote letters to the local newspaper saying the facility should be named after her. She and her family moved away from Marin County; she did not return for nearly a decade.

== Legacy ==
After The Serial was out of print for many years, Apostrophe Books issued a digital edition in 2012 on the 35th anniversary of the initial publication. McFadden contributed a new preface and spoke in interviews about her work. She acknowledged the novel's place references and status symbols ("what people bought because it was the thing to have") are out of date, and most importantly "the language of The Serial, thank God, is thoroughly outdated". She said there was a brief discussion with the publisher about possibly revising the text, but they decided "it's a time capsule piece, about a particular time and place", and agreed not to change it.

In his 2024 book, Well Beings: How the Seventies Lost its Mind and Taught Us to Find Ourselves, James Riley traces the still-thriving wellness movement to the 1970s "fad diets and experimental health projects" that McFadden skewered, and that were largely associated with the "flakiness" of Marin.

== See also ==
I Want It All Now!
