= Tamalpais-Homestead Valley, California =

Tamalpais-Homestead Valley
- Census-designated place
- Interactive map of Tamalpais-Homestead Valley
- Location within San Francisco Bay Area Location within California Location within the United States
- Coordinates: 37°53′46″N 122°32′35″W
- Country: United States
- State: California
- County: Marin

Government
  - County Board: District 3 - Stephanie Moulton-Peters; District 4 - Denis Rodoni
  - State Senate: Mike McGuire (D)
  - Assembly: Damon Connolly (D)
  - U. S. Congress: Jared Huffman (D)

Area
  - Total: 4.747 sq mi (12.29 km^{2})
  - Land: 4.685 sq mi (12.13 km^{2})
  - Water: 0.062 sq mi (0.16 km^{2}) 1.31%

Population (2020)
  - Total: 11,492
  - Density: 2,452.93/sq mi (947.08/km^{2})
- Time zone: UTC-8 (PST)
  - Summer (DST): UTC-7 (PDT)
- ZIP code: 94941
- Area codes: 415/628
- FIPS code: 06-77805

Tamalpais-Homestead Valley is a census-designated place (CDP) in Marin County, California, United States. The population was 11,492 at the 2020 census.

== Geography ==
Tamalpais-Homestead Valley is located at 37°53′19″N 122°32′23″W. It is bordered by Mill Valley to the north and Sausalito to the southeast. It is about 10 minutes north of San Francisco and the Golden Gate Bridge by car. California State Route 1 (also known as Shoreline Highway and the Pacific Coast Highway) runs through the Valley and is the road most often used to access western Marin County. Nearby landmarks include the Golden Gate National Recreation Area, Mount Tamalpais State Park, Muir Woods National Monument, Tennessee Valley and Muir Beach.

According to the United States Census Bureau, the CDP has a total area of 4.7 square miles (12 km^{2}), of which 0.06 square miles (0.16 km^{2}), or 1.31%, are water.

== Demographics ==
Historical population
Census	Pop.	Note	%±
1980	8,511		—
1990	9,601		12.8%
2000	10,691		11.4%
2010	10,735		0.4%
2020	11,492		7.1%
U.S. Decennial Census; 1860–1870 1880-1890; 1900 1910 1920; 1930 1940 1950; 1960 1970 1980; 1990 2000 2010; 2020

Tamalpais-Homestead first appeared as a census designated place in the 1980 U.S. census.

=== Racial and ethnic composition ===
Tamalpais-Homestead Valley CDP, California – Racial and ethnic composition Note: the US Census treats Hispanic/Latino as an ethnic category. This table excludes Latinos from the racial categories and assigns them to a separate category. Hispanics/Latinos may be of any race.
Race / Ethnicity (NH = Non-Hispanic)	Pop 2000	Pop 2010	Pop 2020	% 2000	% 2010	% 2020
White alone (NH)	9,341	9,123	9,115	87.37%	84.98%	79.32%
Black or African American alone (NH)	97	85	72	0.91%	0.79%	0.63%
Native American or Alaska Native alone (NH)	18	13	15	0.17%	0.12%	0.13%
Asian alone (NH)	531	587	590	4.97%	5.47%	5.13%
Native Hawaiian or Pacific Islander alone (NH)	7	23	7	0.07%	0.21%	0.06%
Other race alone (NH)	33	37	74	0.31%	0.34%	0.64%
Mixed race or Multiracial (NH)	255	368	776	2.39%	3.43%	6.75%
Hispanic or Latino (any race)	409	499	843	3.83%	4.65%	7.34%
Total	10,691	10,735	11,492	100.00%	100.00%	100.00%

=== 2020 census ===
As of the 2020 census, Tamalpais-Homestead Valley had a population of 11,492. The population density was 2,452.9 inhabitants per square mile (947.1/km^{2}). The racial makeup of Tamalpais-Homestead Valley was 80.9% White, 0.6% African American, 0.3% Native American, 5.2% Asian, 0.1% Pacific Islander, 1.9% from other races, and 11.1% from two or more races. Hispanic or Latino of any race were 7.3% of the population.

The census reported that 99.8% of the population lived in households, 0.2% lived in non-institutionalized group quarters, and no one was institutionalized. In addition, 99.9% of residents lived in urban areas, while 0.1% lived in rural areas.

There were 4,460 households, out of which 35.2% included children under the age of 18. Of all households, 59.0% were married-couple households, 5.4% were cohabiting couple households, 22.4% had a female householder with no spouse or partner present, and 13.2% had a male householder with no spouse or partner present. 22.5% of households were one person, and 11.8% were one person aged 65 or older. The average household size was 2.57. There were 3,148 families (70.6% of all households).

The age distribution was 23.8% under the age of 18, 5.5% aged 18 to 24, 17.9% aged 25 to 44, 32.6% aged 45 to 64, and 20.2% who were 65 years of age or older. The median age was 46.9 years. For every 100 females, there were 94.3 males, and for every 100 females age 18 and over there were 91.0 males age 18 and over.

There were 4,678 housing units at an average density of 998.5 units per square mile (385.5 units/km^{2}), of which 4,460 (95.3%) were occupied and 4.7% were vacant. Of the occupied units, 78.1% were owner-occupied and 21.9% were occupied by renters. The homeowner vacancy rate was 0.6% and the rental vacancy rate was 3.5%.

=== 2023 estimates ===
In 2023, the US Census Bureau estimated that 12.3% of the population were foreign-born. Of all people aged 5 or older, 90.5% spoke only English at home, 5.0% spoke Spanish, 2.8% spoke other Indo-European languages, and 1.6% spoke Asian or Pacific Islander languages. Of those aged 25 or older, 98.8% were high school graduates and 79.1% had a bachelor's degree.

The median household income was $238,158, and the per capita income was $114,931. About 2.3% of families and 3.9% of the population were below the poverty line.

== Education ==
Most of the CDP is within the Mill Valley Elementary School District, though some is served by the Sausalito Marin City School District. All of it falls within the Tamalpais Union High School District.
