= Mill Valley School District =

School district in California

Address
- 411 Sycamore Avenue Mill Valley, California, 94941; United States

District information
- Type: Public
- Grades: K–8
- Superintendent: Dr. Kimberly Berman
- NCES District ID: 0624870

Students and staff
- Students: 2,640 (2020–2021)
- Teachers: 137.54 (FTE)
- Staff: 113.65 (FTE)
- Student–teacher ratio: 19.19:1

Other information
- Website: www.mvschools.org

The Mill Valley School District is located 13 miles north of San Francisco and the Golden Gate Bridge in Marin County, California. The district has 5 elementary schools and 1 middle school with an enrollment of approximately 3,200 students in grades K through 8. Four of the schools are located within the City of Mill Valley, while two are located in the adjacent unincorporated areas of Strawberry and Tamalpais Valley.

The district includes almost all of Mill Valley, all of the unincorporated community of Alto, almost all of Strawberry, and portions of the unincorporated communities of Muir Beach and Tamalpais-Homestead Valley. It also includes the community of Almonte.

Graduates of the middle school usually attend Tamalpais High School, which is part of the Tamalpais Union High School District. The District is within the boundaries of the Marin Community College District.

== Schools ==
=== Elementary schools ===
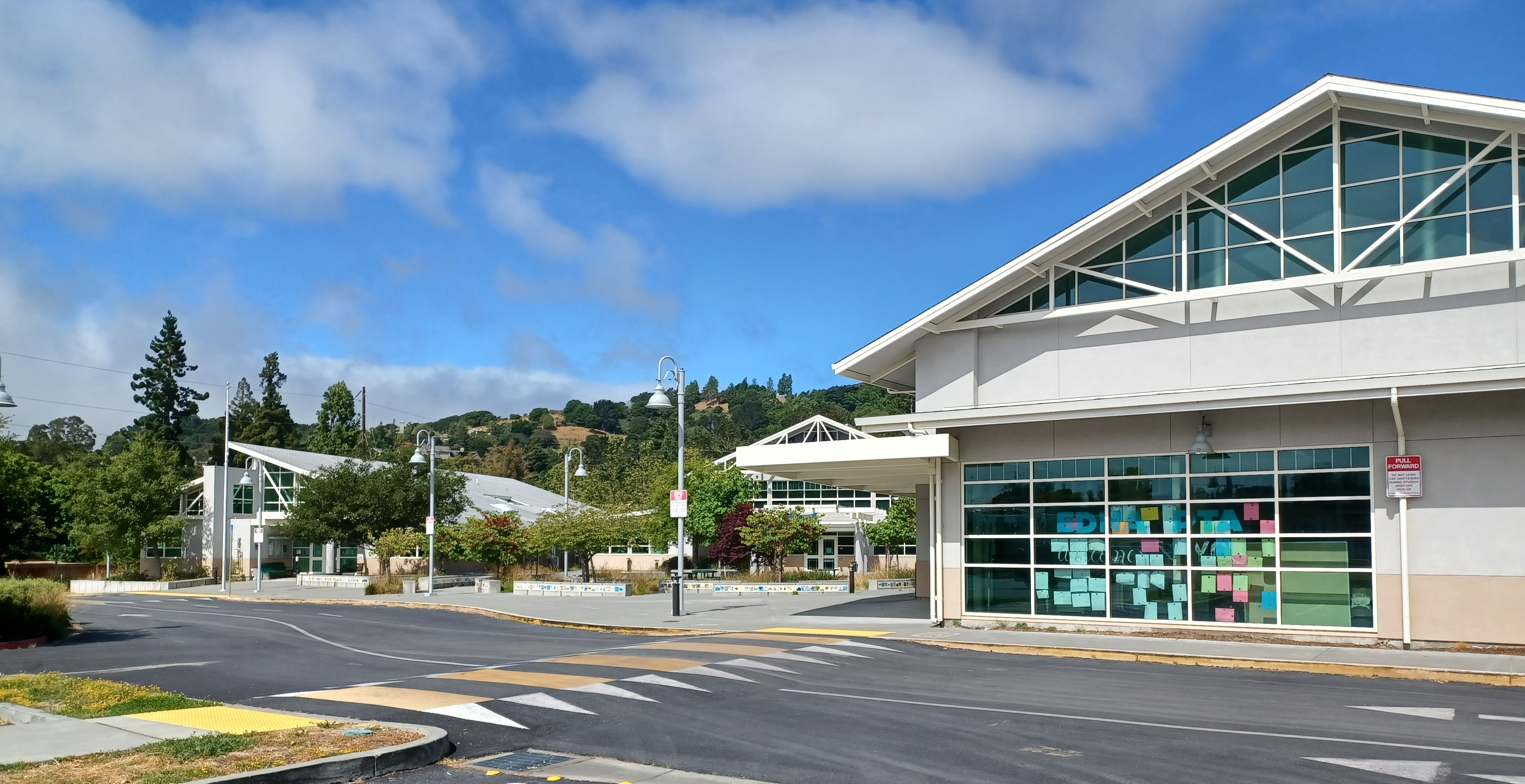
Edna Maguire Elementary

- Park School (opened in 1909 as Tamalpais Park School)
- Old Mill School - (opened on November 19, 1921)
- Edna Maguire School
- Strawberry Point School
- Tamalpais Valley Elementary School

=== Middle school ===
- Mill Valley Middle School, a four-time winner of the California Distinguished School Award.

=== Former schools ===
- Summit School (1892–1939 at Cornelia and Summit; demolished 1941; Mill Valley's first school; also known as "Eastland School," "Mill Valley Grammar School," and "Main")
- Homestead School (1907–1921 at the corner of Janes and Montford Streets; 1921–1930s, as LaVerne School, and 1948–1983, as Homestead School, at the corner of Melrose and Montford, since 1983 leased by and operated as a private school, Marin Horizon School)
- Alto School (70 Lomita Drive)
- Marin Terrace School
- Edna Maguire Junior High School (1956–1970 at 80 Lomita Drive)
