= Greg Adams (writer) =

American writer

Greg Adams (born 1970 in Muncie, Indiana, United States) is an American writer, who ran the independent reissue record label Beehive Rebellion Records, before writing for the AllMusic, penning liner notes for numerous reissue record labels and compiling greatest hits anthologies as an A&R coordinator. Beehive Rebellion issued two releases in the 1990s: a reissue of the New Zealand band Electric Blood's previously cassette-only album Electric Easter (featuring Robert Scott of The Bats) and a reissue of Sex Clark Five's Strum & Drum! that contained the band's complete self-released Records to Russia recordings. The latter was ranked by Goldmine magazine as one of the 50 best U.S. power pop albums of all time. An intended third release, a reissue of the Electric Blood cassettes Acoustic Splendour and Actual Stuff, to be titled The Man Who Tasted Shapes, never materialized. The label was reactivated in 2013 to release the album An Instructive Amusement by his band Cozy Catastrophes, which currently records for Jigsaw Records.

Adams wrote over 1,000 album reviews and artist biographies for AMG and contributed to 10 books in the AllMusic series, in addition to writing liner notes for and/or producing over 60 releases on record labels such as Bear Family, Collectors' Choice Music, ERIC Records, Omni Recording Company, Bloodshot Revival, Soundies, Hit Parade, and Complete 60s. From 2000 to 2008 he hosted Rhythm Ranch, a thematic oldies radio program on WFHB.

Adams conducted pop singer Georgia Gibbs' last interview, which was published on the Eric Records website.

== Official links ==
- Greg Adams' Music Weird website
- Greg Adams on All Music Guide
- Greg Adams on Discogs
- Greg Adams at IMDb
