= Alto, California =

Alto
- Census-designated place
- Location of Alto in Marin County, California.

- Location in California
- Coordinates: 37°54′16″N 122°31′32″W
- Country: United States
- State: California
- County: Marin
- Metro: San Francisco Bay Area

Area
  - Total: 0.13 sq mi (0.33 km^{2})
  - Land: 0.13 sq mi (0.33 km^{2})
  - Water: 0 sq mi (0.00 km^{2}) 0%
- Elevation: 26 ft (8 m)

Population (2020)
  - Total: 732
  - Density: 5,821.2/sq mi (2,247.56/km^{2})
- Time zone: UTC-8 (Pacific (PST))
  - Summer (DST): UTC-7 (PDT)
- ZIP Code: 94941
- Area codes: 415/628
- GNIS feature ID: 218191; 2582933

Alto (Spanish for "Tall") is a census-designated place adjacent to Mill Valley, California, United States, located in Marin County. It lies at an elevation of 26 feet (8 m). The population was 732 at the 2020 census.

== Geography ==
According to the United States Census Bureau, the CDP covered an area of 0.326 square kilometers (0.126 mi^{2}), all land.

== Demographics ==
Historical population
| Census | Pop. | Note | %± |
|---|---|---|---|
| 2010 | 711 | | — |
| 2020 | 732 | | 3.0% |
U.S. Decennial Census; 1860–1870 1880-1890; 1900 1910 1920; 1930 1940 1950; 1960 1970 1980; 1990 2000 2010; 2020

Alto first appeared as a census-designated place in the 2010 United States census.

=== Racial and ethnic composition ===
Alto CDP, California – Racial and ethnic composition Note: the US Census treats Hispanic/Latino as an ethnic category. This table excludes Latinos from the racial categories and assigns them to a separate category. Hispanics/Latinos may be of any race.
| Race / Ethnicity (NH = Non-Hispanic) | Pop 2010 | Pop 2020 | % 2010 | % 2020 |
|---|---|---|---|---|
| White alone (NH) | 585 | 571 | 82.28% | 78.01% |
| Black or African American alone (NH) | 6 | 2 | 0.84% | 0.27% |
| Native American or Alaska Native alone (NH) | 1 | 0 | 0.14% | 0.00% |
| Asian alone (NH) | 29 | 31 | 4.08% | 4.23% |
| Native Hawaiian or Pacific Islander alone (NH) | 1 | 1 | 0.14% | 0.14% |
| Other race alone (NH) | 5 | 13 | 0.70% | 1.78% |
| Mixed race or Multiracial (NH) | 33 | 57 | 4.64% | 7.79% |
| Hispanic or Latino (any race) | 51 | 57 | 7.17% | 7.79% |
| Total | 711 | 732 | 100.00% | 100.00% |

=== 2020 census ===
As of the 2020 census, Alto had a population of 732. The population density was 5,809.5 inhabitants per square mile (2,243.1/km^{2}). The median age was 42.7 years. 24.5% of residents were under the age of 18, 4.9% aged 18 to 24, 23.2% aged 25 to 44, 33.3% aged 45 to 64, and 14.1% of residents were 65 years of age or older. For every 100 females there were 98.4 males, and for every 100 females age 18 and over there were 91.3 males age 18 and over.

100.0% of residents lived in urban areas, while 0.0% lived in rural areas.

There were 294 households, of which 34.0% had children under the age of 18 living in them. Of all households, 51.0% were married-couple households, 5.8% were cohabiting couple households, 15.3% were households with a male householder and no spouse or partner present, and 27.9% were households with a female householder and no spouse or partner present. About 28.9% of all households were made up of individuals and 9.6% had someone living alone who was 65 years of age or older. The average household size was 2.49. There were 193 families (65.6% of all households).

There were 314 housing units at an average density of 2,492.1 units per square mile (962.2 units/km^{2}), of which 6.4% were vacant. The homeowner vacancy rate was 0.0% and the rental vacancy rate was 2.8%. Of occupied units, 52.7% were owner-occupied and 47.3% were occupied by renters.

== Education ==
The community is in the Mill Valley Elementary School District and the Tamalpais Union High School District.
