= Sex Clark Five =

American indie rock band

- Origin: Huntsville, Alabama, USA
- Genres: Indie rock, power pop
- Years active: 1980s–present
- Labels: Records to Russia
- Members: James Butler; Rick Storey; Laura E. Lee
- Past members: Joy Johnson; Trick McKaha

Sex Clark Five (abbreviated SC5) is an underground indie rock band formed in the early 1980s in Huntsville, Alabama. Calling their inventive, sawed-off power pop songs "strum and drum" (a pun on Sturm und Drang), SC5 released several albums that featured the jangly Rickenbacker guitar sound characteristic of Southern college rock bands of the time, including R.E.M. Guitarists James Butler and Rick Storey and drummer Trick McKaha were all friends from Huntsville High School. After stints in Kinks cover and pseudo punk bands, the three recruited bassist Joy Johnson.

Primary singer/songwriter Butler built quirky, catchy melodic hooks around lyrics that often included offbeat European historical references, and wrapped them around rapidly strummed guitars and rave up surf guitar riffs. Politically charged tunes such as "Liberate Tibet" and "Sarajevo" were called prophetic by some critics. In spite of their political content, SC5's songs were often filled with the kind of wry, outlandish humor exemplified by the band's name (a play on The Dave Clark Five). SC5 would count both Goethe and the Marx Brothers as musical influences. The band was also notorious for erratic live shows. Drummer Trick McKaha would sometimes wear a bag over his head.

Sex Clark Five came to the attention of BBC Radio legend John Peel when he was given a copy of their debut EP, "Neita Grew Up Last Night." After playing the disc on his show repeatedly, Peel asked the band to send more. SC5 recorded their first full-length album, Strum and Drum!, in 1986 in Butler's family basement. Noted for its twenty brief tracks (several of which barely exceeded one minute in length), Strum and Drum! was a critical success and an underground favorite of 1987, hailed as "a near-classic first step" by Trouser Press. The album received extensive college radio airplay and earned the band a small but devoted following. Some contemporary indie bands have acknowledged Strum and Drum! as a pop milestone. SC5 later issued Battle of Sex Clark Five, Ketchup if You Can (EP), and Antedium, incorporating essentially the same formula, but to less critical acclaim.

During the 1990s, SC5 continued to record but found only small labels with few resources to promote them. The band released an EP, Hit Parade, under the name Martin Luther Kinks with Rick Storey serving as singer/songwriter. More than one major label expressed interest in SC5, but the band was unable to follow up due to chronic disorganization. The band toured sporadically and recorded four sessions for John Peel, usually with many unreleased tracks. Johnson left the group in 1993 and was replaced by singer Laura E. Lee. Trick left the group in 1995, although he played accompaniment on some of the later releases. Butler and Storey collaborated on Crimson Panzer (2000), which again appeared almost exclusively on the John Peel Show.

In the May 2006 issue of GQ, A.C. Newman of the New Pornographers nominated the SC5 as his "unsung heroes."

SC5’s Strum and Drum Opera Ghost Brigade (2018) and The Orange Album (2020) received their world premieres and were played in full on WFMU New York.

In 2020 SC5 was featured in the double LP collection STRUM AND THRUM (named after SC5’s legendary first album) The American Underground Jangle 1983-1987, released by Captured Tracks Records. The liner notes call Ghost Brigade “absolutely brilliant” and dub SC5 as “America’s most inexplicable band.”

== Discography ==
- Neita Grew Up Last Night EP (Records to Russia, 1985)
- Strum and Drum! (Records to Russia, 1987; Subway Records UK 1990; Beehive Rebellion, 1996)
- Battle of Sex Clark Five (Bloodmoney Records/Skyclad, 1989)
- Ketchup If You Can EP (Records to Russia, 1991)
- Antedium (Records to Russia, 1993)
- Crimson Panzer (Records to Russia, 2000)
- Rembrandt X (Records to Russia, 2013)
- Ghost Brigade: A Strum and Drum Opera (Records to Russia, 2018)
- The Orange Album (Records to Russia 2020)
- Biden Goes to Bitburg single (sc5songs.com 2022)
