= Serial (1980 film) =

1980 American comedy film directed by Bill Persky

- Film poster
- Directed by: Bill Persky
- Screenplay by: Rich Eustis; Michael Elias
- Based on: novel The Serial by Cyra McFadden
- Produced by: Sidney Beckerman
- Starring: Martin Mull; Tuesday Weld; Jennifer McAllister; Sally Kellerman; Bill Macy; Pamela Bellwood; Peter Bonerz; Christopher Lee
- Cinematography: Rexford L. Metz
- Edited by: John W. Wheeler
- Music by: Lalo Schifrin
- Distributed by: Paramount Pictures
- Release date: March 28, 1980
- Running time: 90 minutes
- Country: United States
- Language: English
- Box office: $9,870,727

Serial is a 1980 American comedy film directed by Bill Persky. The screenplay, by Rich Eustis and Michael Elias, is drawn from the novel The Serial by Cyra McFadden, published in 1977.

Produced by Sidney Beckerman, the film stars Martin Mull, Tuesday Weld, Sally Kellerman, Christopher Lee, Bill Macy, Peter Bonerz and Tom Smothers. The original music score was composed by Lalo Schifrin.

== Plot ==
In Marin County, California, during the late 1970s, uptight Harvey Holroyd is quickly losing his patience. and endures a mid-life crisis.

On one hand, his wife Kate and her friends are thoroughly caught up in the sexual revolution and new age consciousness-raising and psychobabble. On the other hand, his rebellious teenage daughter Joanie is about to join a cult. To make matters worse, it seems that Harvey and Kate's sexual relationship is seemingly over, as expressed in the film's first scene.

Harvey's best friend Sam, meanwhile, is having marital troubles, and Harvey is trying to land a higher-paying job with his corporate recruiter Luckman. In a parallel, Sam and Angela's sexual relationship is seemingly also over. Sam and Harvey chat about Harvey's mid-life crisis which Sam puts down to the lack of sex.

As marital problems persist, Kate and Harvey separate. The catalyst is a wild party thrown by Joanie while her parents are out at a friend's wedding. Each becomes sexually involved with someone else, albeit rather awkwardly. Harvey tries to avoid the advances of his newly hired secretary, Stella, who lures him to an orgy, but he does begin seeing Marlene, a free-spirited, 19-year-old, strictly vegetarian supermarket cashier. Kate links up with Paco, a bisexual Argentine aspiring to be an artist, whose profession for now is to trim her dog's hair.

Being unhappy at home, Joanie is lured by "concerned" members of a flower-peddling cult. She goes voluntarily at first and finds peace and tranquility there, but eventually finds herself virtually imprisoned in their house in the big city.

Harvey and Kate manage to patch up their differences for Joanie's sake. By means of a little blackmail that ensues from a surprise revelation involving Luckman, a gay motorcycle gang joins forces with Harvey to rescue Joanie. Thus, the Holroyds are reunited, Harvey and Kate renew their vows and prepare for Harvey's new job in Denver.

== Cast ==
- Martin Mull as Harvey Holroyd
- Tuesday Weld as Kate Holroyd
- Jennifer McAllister as Joanie Holroyd
- Sally Kellerman as Martha
- Sam Chew Jr. as Bill, Martha's latest husband
- Anthony Battaglia as Stokeley, Martha's son
- Nita Talbot as Angela Stone
- Bill Macy as Sam Stone
- Pamela Bellwood as Carol
- Barbara Rhoades as Vivian
- Ann Weldon as Rachel, Martha's housekeeper
- Peter Bonerz as Dr. Leonard Miller, a psychiatrist
- Christopher Lee as Luckman ("Skull")
- Patch Mackenzie as Stella
- Stacey Nelkin as Marlene
- Tom Smothers as Spike
- Clark Brandon as Spenser
- Paul Rossilli as Paco
- Robin Sherwood as Woman Saltzburger

== Production ==
Filmmaker Gary Weis was originally hired to helm the production, but was replaced by Bill Persky in May 1979 due to "creative differences." Principal photography on the project began in May 1979, and wrapped up in September 1979. A 34 day time-frame was the initial shooting schedule for the film. Filming locations included Los Angeles and San Francisco. Producer Sidney Beckerman cast 20 couples from a nearby nudist colony for an orgy scene in the movie, which ended up being filmed at Paramount Studios.

The movie was Martin Mull's first feature film where he played the lead character. Mull mused that he must have been hired "as an oversight on the part of Paramount Pictures":

I think someone must have whispered the words 'tax shelter' to them. No, seriously, after reading the script, I wanted it real bad, but at that point I think they were after a big gun, a big name: Bill Bixby. Seriously, Redford or someone like that. They sent the script to me to read one of the smaller roles. We asked for a screen test and they must have liked it — I got the job.

Mull opined that the film was "essentially reality", but in his view, he did not think Persky intended to create a story of "historic or psychiatric significance", but he did strive to make all the scenes "as naturally lush as possible; meanwhile, all the people in the movie are oblivious to the beauty around them, are oblivious to life." Mull also recalled that he tried ad-libbing some scenes, but Persky would have to remind him that while his bits were indeed funny, "that's Martin Mull, not Harvey Holroyd, your character Harvey would watch Martin Mull on television." He remembered one ad lib that did make its way into the film was where he told a secretary he was thinking about hiring, that it is okay if she can not take dictation "more than 40 words a minute because, I never speak more than 40 words per minute."

== Critical reception ==
Film historian Vito Russo wrote that "the film is permeated with hatred for gays and could have easily been written by Jerry Falwell; and that it was "the perfect anti-feminist, homophobic statement to usher in the age of Ronald Reagan." Film critic John Kiely observed that the film "is at its best when it is lewd, nasty, irreverent, unkind and socially irresponsible, however, it tends to stumble over good intentions and the perverse belief that it has to come out in favor of something in its final half hour."

Bruce McCabe of the Boston Globe wrote "the nervous tone of the film works against its good cast. Martin Mull, a master of deadpan, seems the most sinned–against. He's required to play a square. Mull looks square but the secret of his success is the hip stuff that comes out of his mouth. To take that stuff away from him makes him an uninteresting center to this film." Critic James Silver said "the film is richly populated with characters that are consistently true to life and absolutely hilarious; it is an evenly paced, coherent and most enjoyable little film that is a major grin."

Canadian film critic Jay Scott stated it is "a brilliant, satirical movie that until its last half hour is near the top of the list of great American social comedies." In conclusion, he wrote "the movie lays back with a coda ambiguous and hopeful, bordering on the happy; it's downright mellow, for God's sake." Critic Vincent Canby opined "it is a post-card-pretty, very cheerful comedy ... even if you don't laugh nonstop, you'll smile a lot ... also effective is Rexford Metz's photography — all primary colors and as crystal clear and unshadowed as a cartoon."

Serial holds a 60% rating on Rotten Tomatoes based on six reviews.

== See also ==
- American comedy films
- List of American films of 1980
- List of LGBTQ-related films of 1980
