= Cyra McFadden =

American writer (1937–2024)

Cyra McFadden (December 2, 1937 – April 20, 2024) was an American author. She was a college English teacher, a freelance journalist and a newspaper columnist.

Cyra (née Taillon) McFadden was born in Great Falls, Montana, to Nedra Ann "Pat" (née Montgomery) a showgirl from Paragould, Arkansas, and the first wife of James Cyrille "Cy" Taillon (1907-1980) a rodeo announcer.

McFadden spent much of her childhood traveling with her parents on the rodeo circuit and living in Missoula, Montana.

McFadden attended Missoula County High School, while working at the Missoulian. She earned B.A. and M.A. degrees in English literature at San Francisco State University, and taught in the English department from 1972 to 1977.

McFadden was a Kappa Kappa Gamma Beta Phi alumna of University of Montana.

In 1975-1976, for 52 weeks. Cyra McFadden, a Mill Valley resident, wrote, and Pacific Sun published, a chapter of The Serial, a satire about the trendy lifestyles of the affluent residents in Marin County, California, just north of San Francisco. "Thirty of the book's 52 chapters originally appeared in...the Pacific Sun." In 1977, Alfred A. Knopf published all 52 episodes in a spiral bound 111-page book that sold for $4.95.

The book was made into a 1980 movie called Serial, starring Tuesday Weld and Martin Mull.

Mostly in the 1980s, McFadden wrote a biweekly column for the San Francisco Examiner for six years, and was also a features writer for that daily newspaper.

In 1986, McFadden wrote a memoir entitled Rain or Shine: A Family Memoir, in which she described her childhood growing up as the daughter of James C. "Cy" Taillon, a well-known rodeo announcer. The book was a finalist for the Pulitzer Prize that year. After being out of print for several years, Rain or Shine was reprinted in 1998.

McFadden later lived on a houseboat in Sausalito, California.

== Works ==
- The Serial (1977) New York: Alfred A. Knopf
- Rain or Shine: A Family Memoir. (1986) New York: Alfred A. Knopf. ISBN 9780394519371
