= Bothin =

Bothin may refer to:

- Bothin, California
- Bothin Marsh
