= William Anthony Richardson =

California pioneer, city founder

William A. Richardson
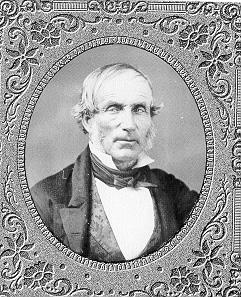
- Born: August 27, 1795; London, England
- Died: April 20, 1856 (aged 60); Sausalito, California

William Anthony Richardson (August 27, 1795 – April 20, 1856) was an early California entrepreneur, influential in the development of the settlement called Yerba Buena, the forerunner of the city of San Francisco.

Richardson was the first to receive a land grant in the city, deeded to him by the alcalde, José Joaquín Estudillo. He was subsequently granted the Rancho Saucelito, an even larger rancho land holding across San Francisco Bay comprising a large portion of present-day southeastern Marin County. On these lands, he founded the city of Sausalito.

== Life ==
Richardson arrived as second mate aboard the British whaling ship Orion in San Francisco Bay in 1822, shortly after Mexico had won its independence from Spain. An English mariner who had picked up a fluency in Spanish during his travels, he jumped ship after meeting and dancing with a local woman, Maria Antonia Martinez, at an all-night fiesta. He quickly became an influential presence in the now-Mexican territory. By 1825, Richardson had assumed Mexican citizenship, converted to Roman Catholicism and married Maria Antonia Martinez (1803–1887), the eldest daughter of Ygnacio Martínez, commandant of the Presidio of San Francisco and, in 1842, grantee of Rancho El Pinole. His ambitions now expanding to land holdings of his own; Richardson submitted a petition to Governor Echeandía for a rancho on the headlands across the Golden Gate from the Presidio, to be called "Rancho Saucelito". The Spanish word saucelito is believed to refer to a small cluster of willows, a moist-soil tree, indicating the presence of a freshwater spring and/or creek (possibly Coyote Creek).

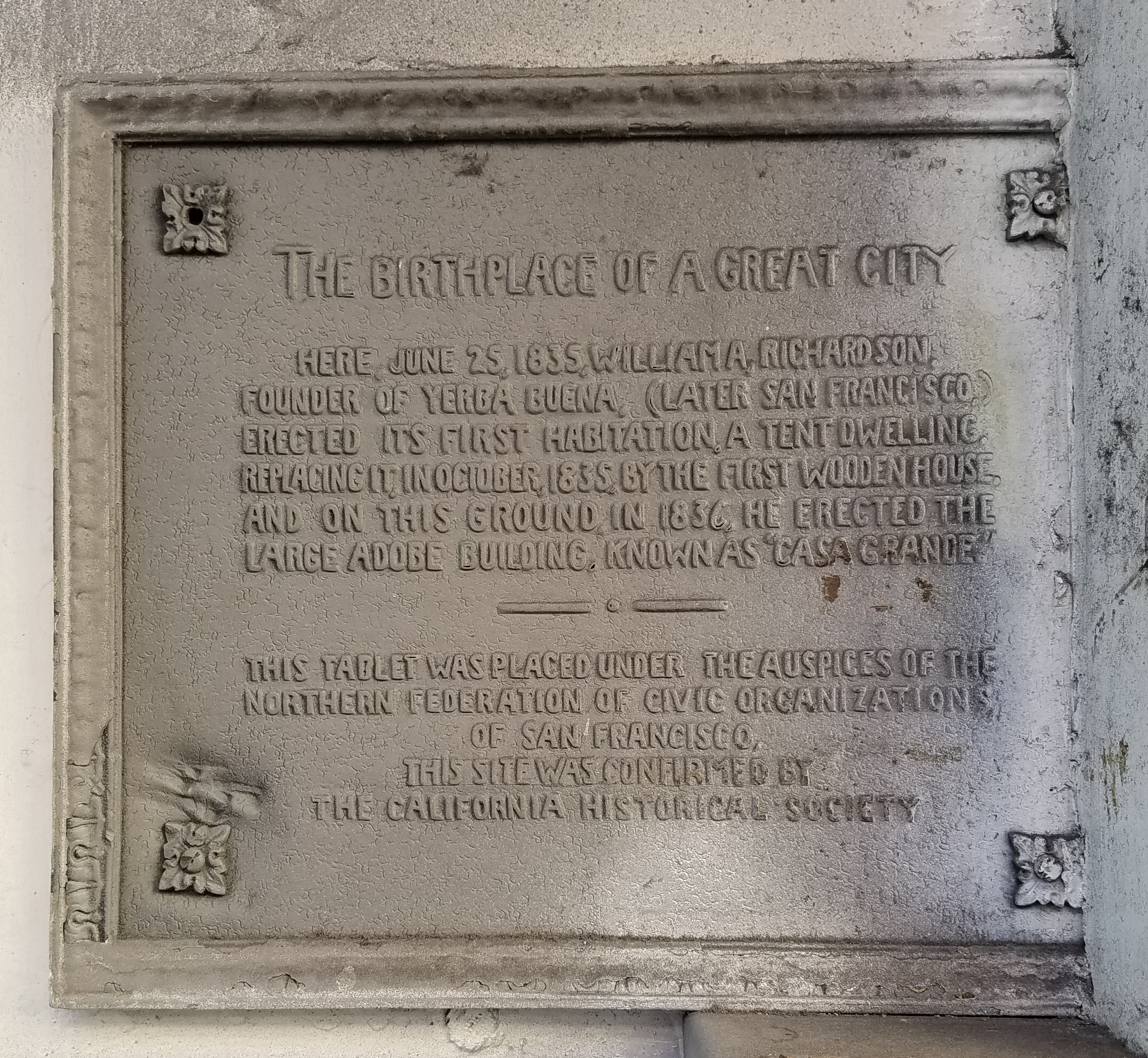
"Birthplace of a great city" plaque at 823 Grant Avenue, San Francisco, commemorating Richardson's erection of Yerba Buena's first housing structure in 1835

Before filing his claim, Richardson had already capitalized on the freshwater source by establishing a watering station near the present-day town of Sausalito. This station provided fresh water to visiting vessels, serving as a lucrative venture. The inlet between Sausalito and the Tiburon Peninsula, known today as Richardson Bay, marked the northern boundary of Richardson's claim. However, his legal ownership of the land was shaky due to competing claims and Mexican laws that designated headlands for military purposes rather than private ownership.

Recognizing the challenges to his claim, Richardson shifted his focus and settled outside the Presidio. There, he constructed the area's first two-story wood-frame house and laid out the street plan for the settlement of Yerba Buena, including a Spanish-style plaza now known as Portsmouth Square. The settlement aimed to serve as a trading post and supply point for ships navigating San Francisco Bay. Richardson's seafaring experience was instrumental in his also being appointed Port Captain, responsible for overseeing maritime commerce and often personally piloting arriving ships to their anchorage.

After years of lobbying and legal wrangling, Richardson was given clear title to all 19,751 acres (79.93 km^{2}) of Rancho Saucelito on February 11, 1838. By 1841, he had sold his holdings across the bay and taken possession of the rancho, while still serving as port captain of Yerba Buena. He had financial problems in his later years and died in bankruptcy.

== Legacy ==
Richardson Bay, offshore from Sausalito; and Richardson Avenue, in San Francisco's Marina District, are named for William Richardson. Richardson Street is one of five consecutive streets in Martinez, California named for the sons-in-law of Don Ygnacio Martínez (whose land grant included the area that became the City of Martinez).

On June 12, 1937, the Daughters of the California Pioneers dedicated a bronze tablet to the memory of Richardson, as the first settler in Yerba Buena in 1835, at Richardson Avenue and the entrance to the Presidio of San Francisco. The tablet was unveiled by the great, great grandson of Richardson, James T. Davis.
