= Rancho Saucelito =

Mexican land grant in California

Coordinates: 37.870°N 122.540°W

Rancho Saucelito (also called "Rancho Sausalito") was a 19,752-acre (79.93 km^{2}) Mexican land grant in present-day Marin County, California, given in 1838 by Governor Juan Alvarado to William A. Richardson. The name means "ranch of the little willow grove". The grant extended from the Pacific Ocean on the west, to Mount Tamalpais to the north, and the Arroyo Corte Madera del Presidio and Richardson Bay on the east; and included present-day Muir Beach, Stinson Beach, Sausalito, Tamalpais Valley, and Homestead Valley.

== History ==
The grant was originally made to José Antonio Galindo in 1835. José Antonio Galindo also received Rancho Laguna de la Merced in 1835. In 1838, José Antonio Galindo was arrested for the murder of José Doroteo Peralta (1810 - 1838), son of Pedro Peralta. Rancho Saucelito was re-granted to William A. (Guillermo Antonio) Richardson.

With the cession of California to the United States following the Mexican-American War, the 1848 Treaty of Guadalupe Hidalgo provided that the land grants would be honored. As required by the Land Act of 1851, a claim for Rancho Saucelito was filed with the Public Land Commission in 1852, and the grant was patented to William Richardson in 1879.

Richardson made a series of poor investments and ended up in debt to many creditors. In 1856, ailing and in financial straits, Captain Richardson put Rancho Saucelito into the hands of an administrator, Samuel R. Throckmorton, and died two months later.

Samuel Reading Throckmorton (1809 - 1883), who had come to San Francisco in 1850 as an agent for an eastern mining business, was the administrator of Richardson's estate. Throckmorton acquired a major part of Rancho Sausalito as payment of debt. In 1868, Throckmorton sold to a group of San Francisco businessmen who called themselves the Sausalito Land & Ferry Company. The mud flats and hillsides were surveyed, roads were graded, and ferry service was inaugurated.

== Historic sites of the Rancho ==
- The Homestead. Around 1866, Samuel Throckmorton built a lodge on Rancho Sausalito, where he brought friends to hunt elk and bear. Throckmorton named the lodge, "The Homestead", a name later applied to the valley. The Homestead burned down in 1900.

== See also ==
- Ranchos of California
- List of Ranchos of California
