= Corte Madera =

Corte Madera may refer to any of several places in California, US:

- Corte Madera, California, an incorporated town in Marin County
- Arroyo Corte Madera del Presidio, a stream in Marin County
- Corte Madera Creek (Marin County, California)
- Corte Madera Creek (San Mateo County, California)
