= Old Mill Creek =

Old Mill Creek may refer to:

- Old Mill Creek, Illinois, in Lake County, Illinois
- Old Mill Creek (Arroyo Corte Madera del Presidio), in Marin County, California
