= Coyote Creek (Marin County) =

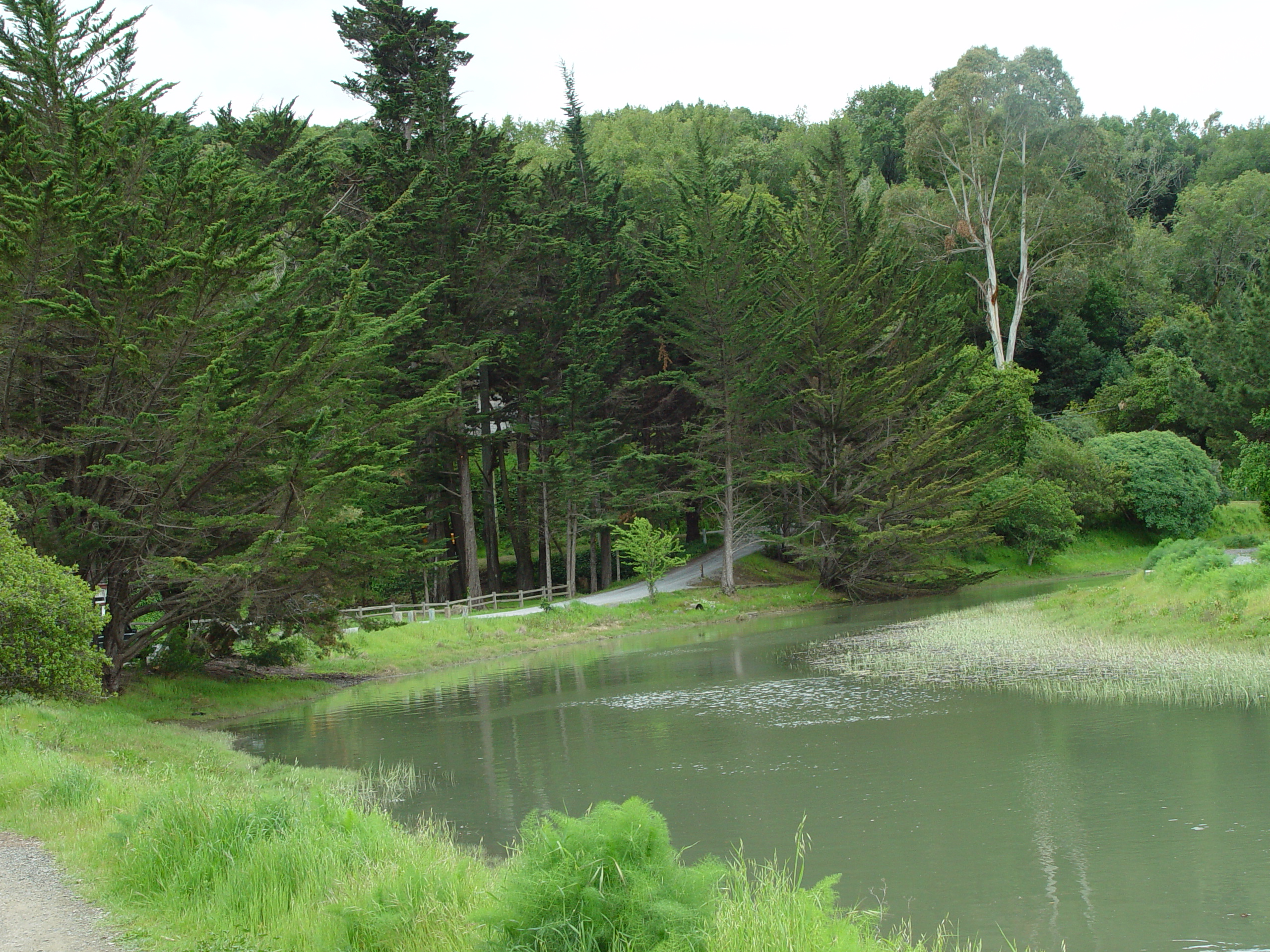
- Coyote Creek flowing through Tam Valley

Location
- Country: United States
- State: California
- Region: Marin County

Physical characteristics
- Source
  - location: Coyote Ridge
  - coordinates: 37°52′06″N 122°32′52″W
  - elevation: 700 ft (210 m)
- Mouth: Richardson's Bay
  - location: Tam Valley, California
  - coordinates: 37°52′59″N 122°31′08″W
  - elevation: 0 ft (0 m)

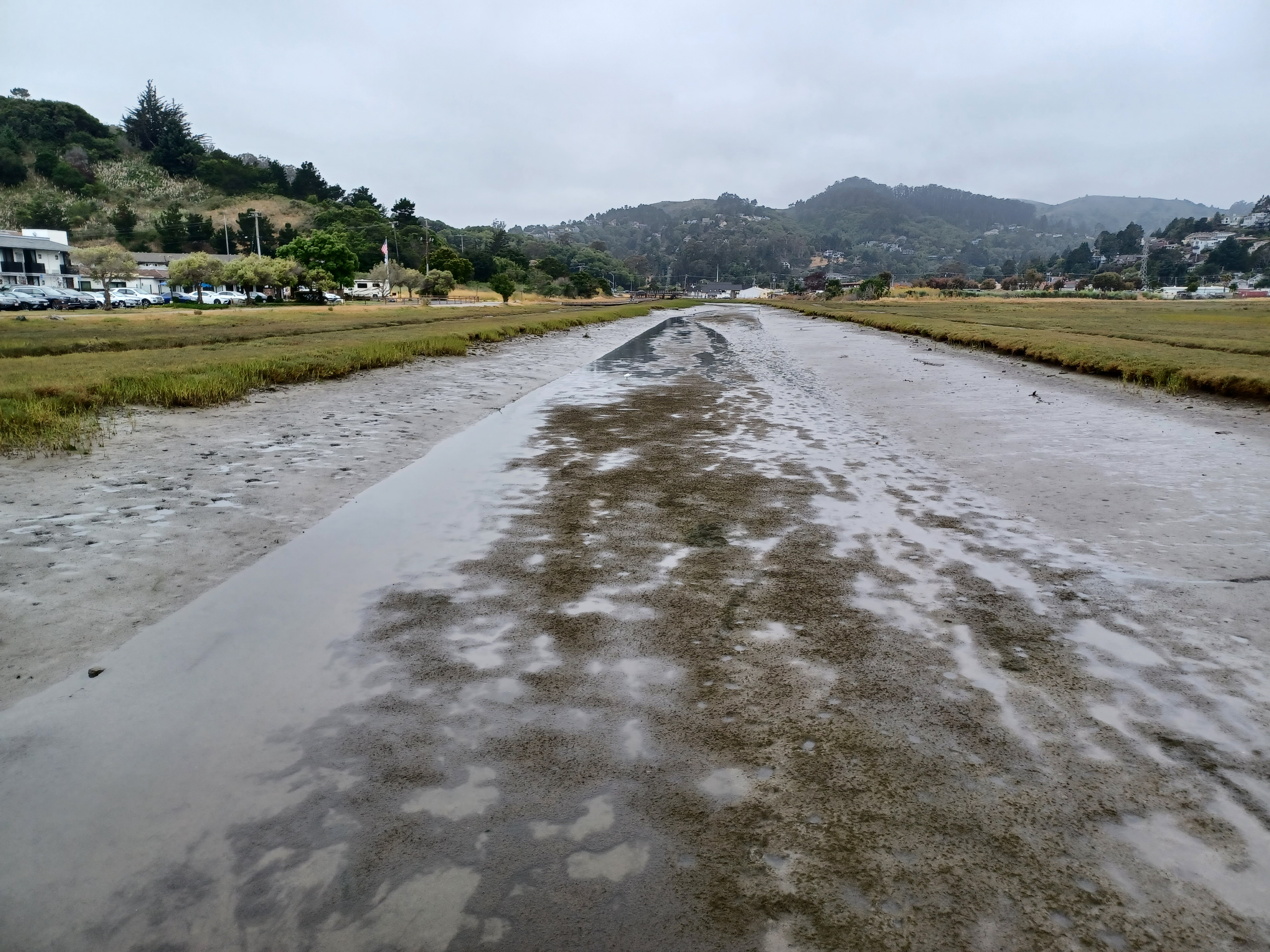
Coyote Creek seen in July 2023 near its mouth

Coyote Creek is a stream in the Richardson Bay watershed, draining Tamalpais-Homestead Valley, California (Tam Valley) eastward into Richardson Bay, Marin County, California, United States. The stream originates on Coyote Ridge and flows 2.5 miles (4.0 km) to the bay at the south end of Bothin Marsh. Coyote Creek is surrounded by a walking/biking path that stretches all the way until the creek reaches the bay (see photo on right, path located around the Creek).

== History ==
The Richardson Bay watershed is located on the aboriginal lands of the Coast Miwok. The Coast Miwok Tribe came to California before the European Settlers. They significantly impacted and inhabited the areas of Marin County and Southern Sonoma County. Spanish colonization began in neighboring Sausalito, California, in 1775, when Juan de Ayala sailed the first ship (the San Carlos) into San Francisco Bay. These explorers named the area Saucelito (“little willows”) after the vegetation spotted from shipboard. When the Mission San Rafael Arcángel, established in 1817, was secularized by the Mexican government in 1834, the mission lands were granted to prominent Californios as ranchos. The Rancho Corte Madera del Presidio (literally, “place where wood is cut for the Presidio”) included a sawmill for processing redwood trees, cattle and horse ranches, a brickyard, and a stone quarry. Sausalito became an important ferry port, connecting Marin to San Francisco. The railroad brought supplies from the north to be shipped across San Francisco Bay.

== Habitat and ecology ==
Historically, Coyote Creek hosted California golden beaver (Castor canadensis subauratus) whose beaver dams likely played a role in removing sediment and improving over-summering habitat for steelhead and salmon smolt.

Other than the beavers, there are many other wild animals that call Coyote Creek home. More specifically, Coyote Creek is located in a neighborhood surrounded by a neighborhood in Mill Valley, CA nicknamed “Bird Land.” Surrounding and in the creek, there are all different species of birds found- from Scrub Blue Jays to Egrets to ducks. These birds are seen around and swimming in the creek.

== Habitat and ecology- Photo Library ==
As stated above, the wildlife seen at the creek is quite remarkable. Check out this to see photos of some of the bids that frequent Coyote Creek: https://docs.google.com/document/d/10oW9GlLx2S1xPlkUu-oFwo9VZqG1g_IkAIy24EoTD-s/edit?usp=sharing

== Flood Zone #3 ==
Coyote Creek is located in Flood Zone #3 which includes areas in Southern Marin that drain into Richardson Bay. In order to reduce flood risks, Marin County Flood Control and Water Conservation District has implemented different flood control devices. The District operates and maintains several stormwater pump stations that protects the residents in neighborhoods around Coyote Creek. If there is a flooding risk, these pumps can remove water from the creek/affected areas to others channels that aren't experiencing over abundance of water.

== See also ==
- List of watercourses in the San Francisco Bay Area
