= Strawberry Spit =

Artificial island in California

- Location within San Francisco Bay Area Location within California Location within the United States

Geography
- Location: Northern California
- Coordinates: 37.889751°N 122.501013°W
- Adjacent to: Richardson's Bay

Administration
- United States
- State: California

Strawberry Spit (also Sanctuary Island) is a small artificial island in the San Francisco Bay's Richardson's Bay embayment of Strawberry Lagoon. It is still referred to as Strawberry Spit, although it no longer is technically a spit.

Historically the spit was a haul out area for harbor seals. A channel was built separating Aramburu Island from the mainland to isolate and therefore protect the seals from human disturbances.

The landscape north and landward of Strawberry Spit is dominated by Ring Mountain, whose slopes are strewn with a multitude of boulders that include minerals such as mica, amphibolite and eclogite.

== See also ==
- Strawberry Lagoon
- Tiburon Peninsula (U.S.)
