= Old Mill Creek (Arroyo Corte Madera del Presidio) =

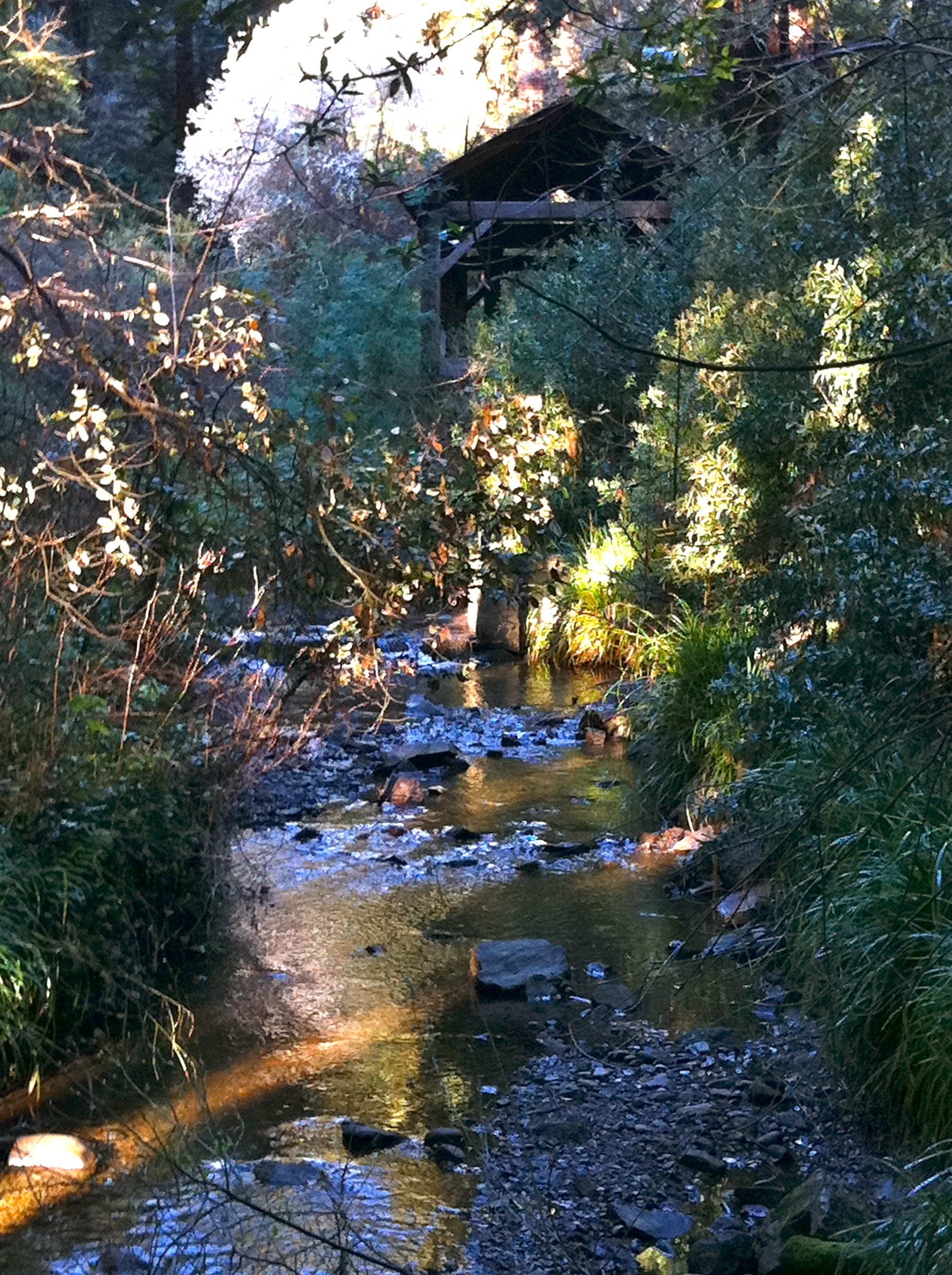
- Old Mill Creek in Old Mill Park (replica of Old Mill in background) in Mill Valley, California

- Location of the mouth of Old Mill Creek in Marin County, California

Location
- Country: United States
- State: California
- Region: Marin County
- City: Mill Valley, California

Physical characteristics
- Source: South flank or Mount Tamalpais East Peak
  - location: 2.0 mi (3 km) northwest of Mill Valley, California
  - coordinates: 37°55′19″N 122°34′26″W
  - elevation: 1,432 ft (436 m)
- Mouth: Confluence with Arroyo Corte Madero del Presidio
  - location: Mill Valley, California
  - coordinates: 37°54′18.73″N 122°32′47.92″W
  - elevation: 17 ft (5.2 m)

Basin features
- Tributaries
  - left: Cascade Creek

Old Mill Creek is a 2.3-mile-long (3.7 km) year-round stream in southern Marin County, California, United States. Old Mill Creek is a tributary to Arroyo Corte Madera del Presidio, which, in turn, flows to Richardson Bay at Mill Valley's municipal Bayfront Park and 106 acres (0.43 km^{2}) Bothin Marsh.

== History ==
Old Mill Creek, as is the town of Mill Valley, is named for the sawmill there, built in 1834 by John Reed, grantee of Rancho Corte Madera del Presidio.

== Watershed ==
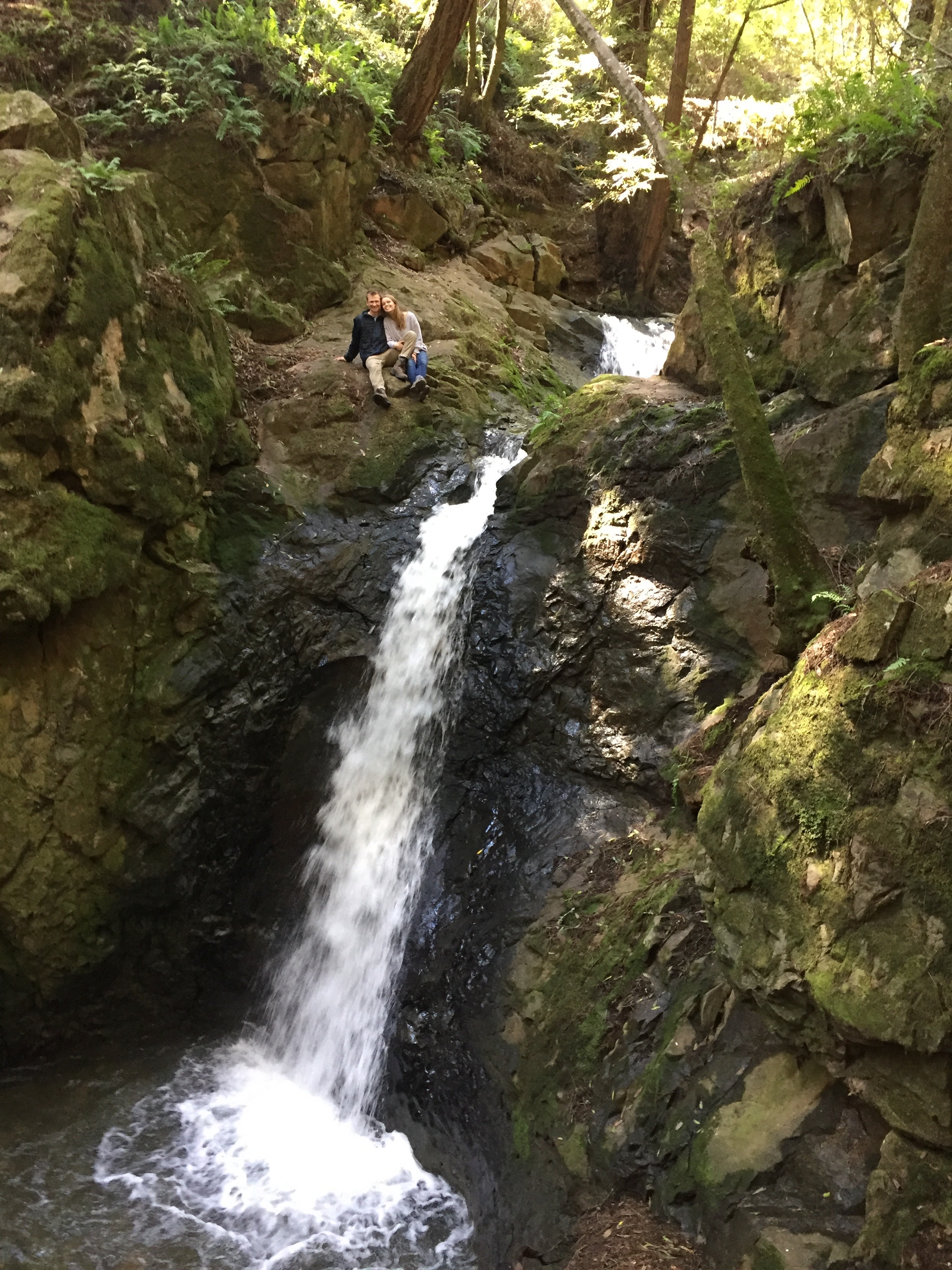
Cascade Falls, a 30-foot cascade in Cascade Creek, a tributary of Old Mill Creek in Mill Valley, California

Old Mill Creek drains a watershed of approximately 1.86 square miles (4.8 km^{2}). Old Mill Creek, and its 1 mile (1.6 km) long tributary Cascade Creek both begin high on the southeast flank of the East Peak of Mount Tamalpais. Old Mill Creek has a small decommissioned dam and reservoir above the convergence with Cascade Creek. The dam was built by noted engineer Michael M. O'Shaughnessy for The Tamalpais Land & Water Co. for water supply to Mill Valley.

== Ecology ==
Old Mill Creek and its Cascade Creek tributary are spring-fed perennial streams.

Historically, the Arroyo Corte Madera del Presidio (Mill Valley) watershed was used by coho salmon (Oncorhynchus kisutch) for spawning and rearing. The last record of coho salmon in Marin County tributaries to San Francisco Bay was on September 18, 1981, when Dr. Rob Leidy reported collecting two juveniles from Corte Madera Creek and two from Old Mill Creek. NOAA Fisheries has identified both the Corte Madera Creek and Arroyo Corte Madera del Presidio watersheds as critical habitat for coho salmon. In its 2004 "Recovery Strategy for California Coho Salmon" the California Department of Fish and Game recommended restoration of the Arroyo Corte Madera del Presidio watersheds' historic coho salmon habitat. This is one of only two San Francisco Bay Area streams considered in the Department's 2004 Strategy to be essential to the recovery of coho salmon in California.

Steelhead/rainbow trout (Oncorhynchus mykiss) continue to enter Old Mill Creek and reproduce successfully, despite multiple partial fish barriers. The culverted reach of Old Mill Creek beneath the post office in Mill Valley is a severe barrier to fish passage evaluation. Cascade Dam, located on Old Mill Creek 0.4 miles (0.64 km) above the confluence with Cascade Creek, was constructed in the 1870s and is a complete barrier to upstream fish passage. According to a restoration feasibility study for the Arroyo Corte Madera del Presidio drainage, Old Mill Creek provides the best remaining salmonid habitat in the watershed. A 2003 stream crossing and fish passage evaluation identified key passage barriers under the Post Office and at Cascade Drive. A California Department of Fish and Wildlife Stream Inventory Report concluded in 2009 that Old Mill Creek should be managed as an anadromous, natural production stream.

== See also ==
- Mount Tamalpais
- Arroyo Corte Madera del Presidio
- List of watercourses in the San Francisco Bay Area
- Richardson Bay
