= Bothin, California =

Bothin Convalescent Hospital
- Former hospital
- Location in California Bothin Convalescent Hospital (the United States)
- Coordinates: 38°00′15″N 122°37′09″W
- Country: United States
- State: California
- County: Marin County
- Elevation: 292 ft (89 m)

The Bothin Convalescent Hospital was established in 1910 as a place for women and children to convalesce after illness or surgery. The hospital was built by Henry Bothin on a thousand-acre parcel of land he had purchased in 1903 along the Northwestern Pacific Railroad near Fairfax, California. Later, a tuberculosis sanitarium was constructed on the same property. A railroad station named Bothin served the hospitals. When Bothin died in 1923, he left behind a charitable foundation to support these facilities and other non-profit organizations. The convalescent home closed in 1940 and the tuberculosis hospital operated until the 1950s.

In 1948 the Marin Girl Scouts Council began using part of the property for summer activities. Scouting activity grew each year until 1959 when the entire property was leased to the Girl Scouts. Known as Camp Bothin, the site is officially named the Henry E. Bothin Youth Camp. There have been numerous claims of ghost citings at the camp, mostly relating to its prior use as a tuberculosis sanitarium

== See also ==
- Bothin Marsh
