= Tamalpais Valley, California =

Unincorporated community in California, United States

Tamalpais Valley
- Unincorporated community
- Nickname: Tam Valley
- Location in California Tamalpais Valley (the United States)
- Coordinates: 37°52′47″N 122°32′45″W
- Country: United States
- State: California
- County: Marin

Government
  - Senate: Mike McGuire (D)
  - Assembly: Stephanie Nguyen (D)
  - U. S. Congress: Jared Huffman (D)

Area
  - Total: 0.795312 sq mi (2.05985 km^{2})
- Elevation: 108 ft (33 m)

Population (2020)
  - Total: 11,492
  - Density: 14,450/sq mi (5,579.1/km^{2})
- Time zone: UTC-8 (PST)

Tamalpais Valley (Miwok: Támal Pájiṣ) is an unincorporated community in Marin County, California, United States.

== Land ==
Tamalpais Valley is located at 37°53′19″N 122°32′23″W. and is about 509 acres in size, with an elevation of 108 feet (33 m). The nearest cities are Mill Valley to the north and Sausalito to the southeast. Traveling by car, Tamalpais Valley is located about 10 minutes from the Golden Gate Bridge and fifteen minutes from San Francisco. California State Route 1 (also known as Shoreline Highway and the Pacific Coast Highway) runs through the Valley and is the road most often used to access western Marin County.

Nearby landmarks include the Golden Gate National Recreation Area (GGNRA), Mount Tamalpais State Park, Muir Woods National Monument, Tennessee Valley, and Muir Beach.

A large portion of Tamalpais Valley is federal parkland – the Golden Gate National Recreation Area. The area's wooded canyons host diverse wildlife, including deer, raccoons, squirrels, skunks, coyotes, foxes, chipmunks, bobcats. and mountain lions – as well as a wide variety of birds, including hummingbirds, sparrows, robins, doves, jays, hawks, herons, quail, owls, falcons, eagles, and vultures.

== People ==
In 2009, Tamalpais Valley's population was estimated at 11,000 (nearly the same size as Sausalito). For census purposes, Tamalpais Valley is aggregated with Homestead Valley into the census-designated place Tamalpais-Homestead Valley.

== Government ==
Tamalpais Valley is an unincorporated community of approximately 2,800 households, plus a few small businesses. Its local governmental agency is the Tamalpais Community Services District (TCSD), whose board of directors is elected by residents.

== History ==
Tamalpais Valley was first inhabited by Native American tribes such as the Miwok Indians, who left the area with the establishment of the Spanish mission and Presidio in San Francisco. Called Coyote Hollow on 19th century maps, it was granted as part of Rancho Saucelito to William Richardson in 1838. The land was acquired by attorney Samuel Reading Throckmorton, then title passed to the San Francisco Savings Union. Eventually dairymen of Portuguese Azorean birth purchased the area, among them the Dias and Pimentel/Silva families. For approximately 60 years these families operated dairy ranches around the valley, where some family members still reside. Finally S.A. Moss purchased property in the heart of the valley, and developers Cranston, Belvel & Dwyer renamed it Tamalpais Valley (it was known as Big Coyote until 1908); 125 lots were put up for sale to private purchasers in 1908.

Tamalpais Valley's working class and rural community grew at a fast pace during the 1920s as more families settled in the area. Small businesses, such as the Tamalpais Service Station, were opened along Shoreline Highway. By the 1950s, it had become a suburban settlement with its own primary school, sewer system, and local government.

== Recreation ==
The area offers a wide range of hiking and biking trails, featuring scenic views of Mount Tamalpais and the Marin Headlands, as well as the Pacific Ocean and San Francisco Bay. Some of the most popular nearby trails include Tennessee Valley trail, Miwok trail, Dias trail, and Mountain Home trail.

== Points of interest ==
- Mill Valley
- Mount Tamalpais
- Muir Woods
- Richardson Bay
- Tamalpais High School

== See also ==
- List of people from Marin County, California
