= Strawberry Lagoon =

Lagoon in the state of California, United States

Coordinates: 37.885263°N 122.500606°W

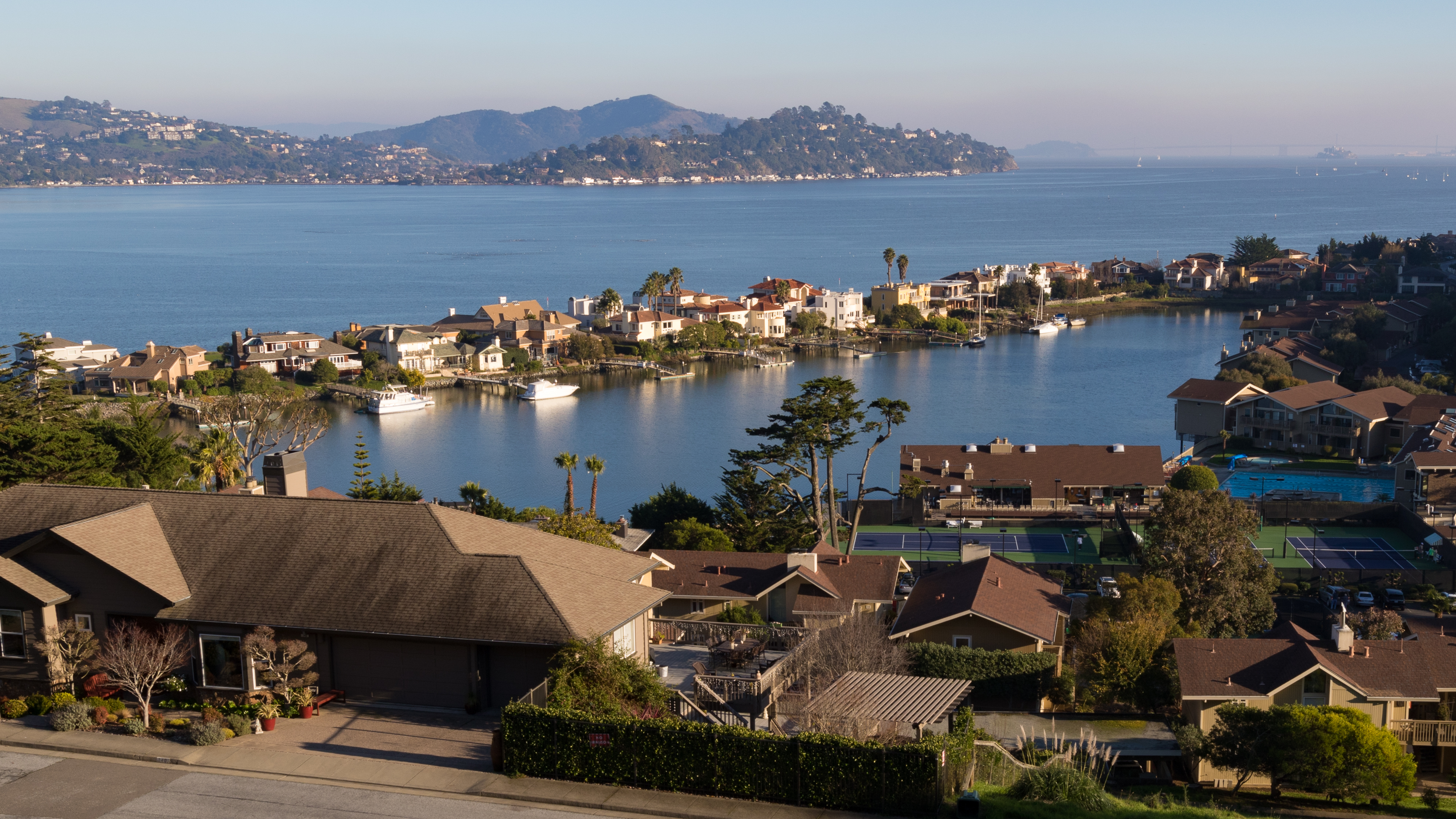
Strawberry Lagoon, 2017.

Strawberry Lagoon is an inlet within Richardson Bay, Marin County, California, United States. This location, particularly on Strawberry Spit, is a winter haul-out area for the Harbor seal. Pressures of urban development at Strawberry Point along with increases in small boat traffic have diminished the use of this lagoon for seal haul out, noted as early as 1990.

== Harbor seal presence ==
The entire Harbor seal population of the San Francisco Bay has been estimated at approximately 500 individuals, of which up to 100 animals have been observed within Strawberry Lagoon, hauling out at Strawberry Spit. Typically Harbor seals in California do not congregate in haul outs in numbers exceeding 100.(Orr, 1972) In the 1980s a channel was created to sever the spit from the mainland creating a more secure haulout for the seals known as Sanctuary Island. An Earth Metrics Inc. study of 1990 provided for more protection of the seals by constructing an earthen berm on the southern part of Sanctuary Island and landscaping this area with shrubby native grasses to provide enhanced privacy for the Harbor seals. The Harbor seal is protected in the USA under the Marine Mammal Protection Act of 1972. (U.S. Congress, 1972)

== Geography and natural history ==
The higher ground above the lagoon is dominated by Ring Mountain, the location of certain extant Native American petroglyphs and a considerable diversity of native flora, including several rare and endangered species. (Hogan, 2008)

== See also ==
- Lyford House
