= Pickleweed Inlet =

Bay in California, United States

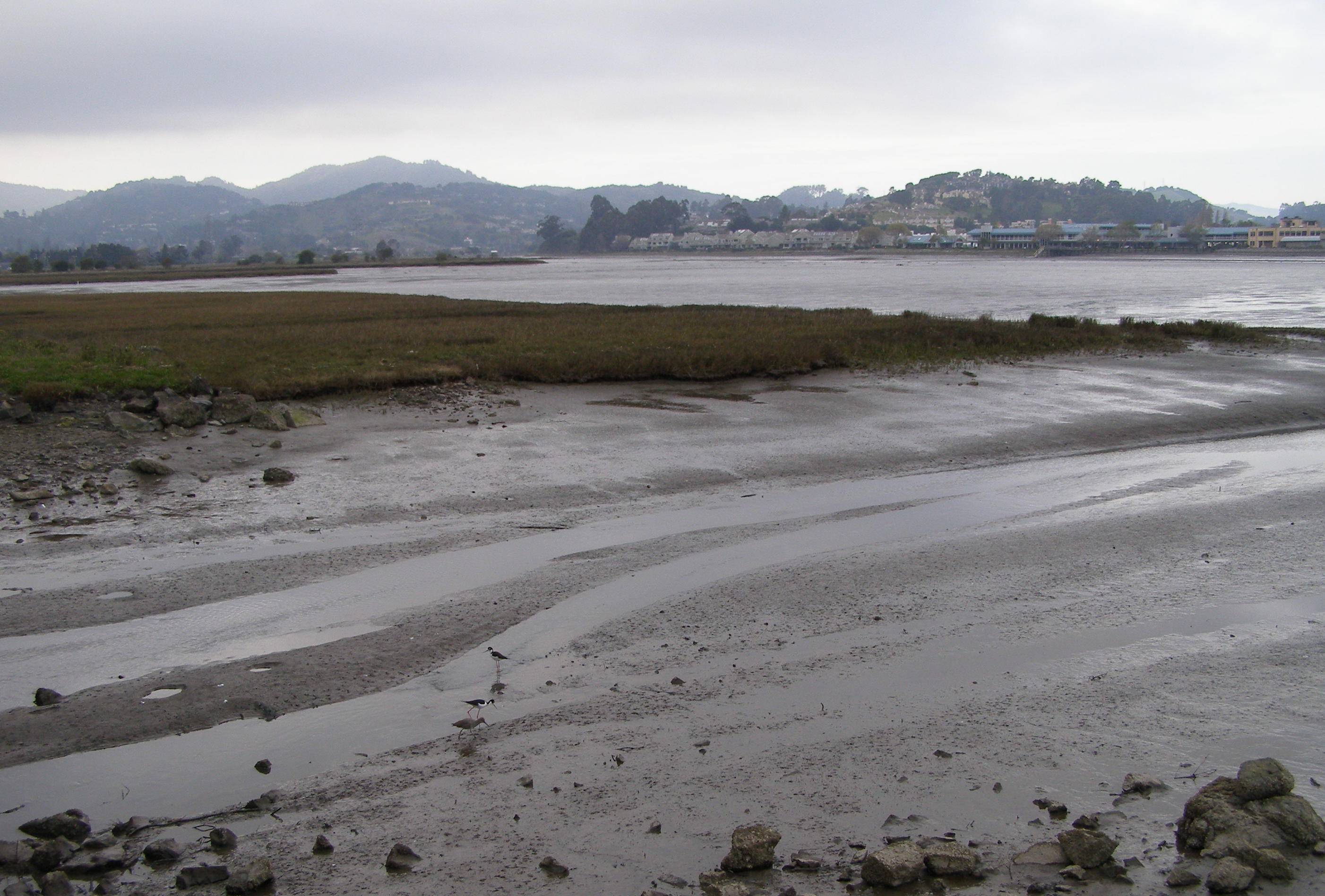
Looking north towards Picklewood Inlet from the mouth of Coyote Creek.

Pickleweed Inlet is a small bay in Marin County, California, United States, located at 37.8943°N 122.5241°W. It discharges to the west side of Richardson Bay, an arm of the San Francisco Bay. The estuary contains mudflats used by various avifauna. There is a well-used hiking trail that runs along Picklewood Inlet.
