= Arroyo Corte Madera del Presidio =

Arroyo Corte Madero del Presidio
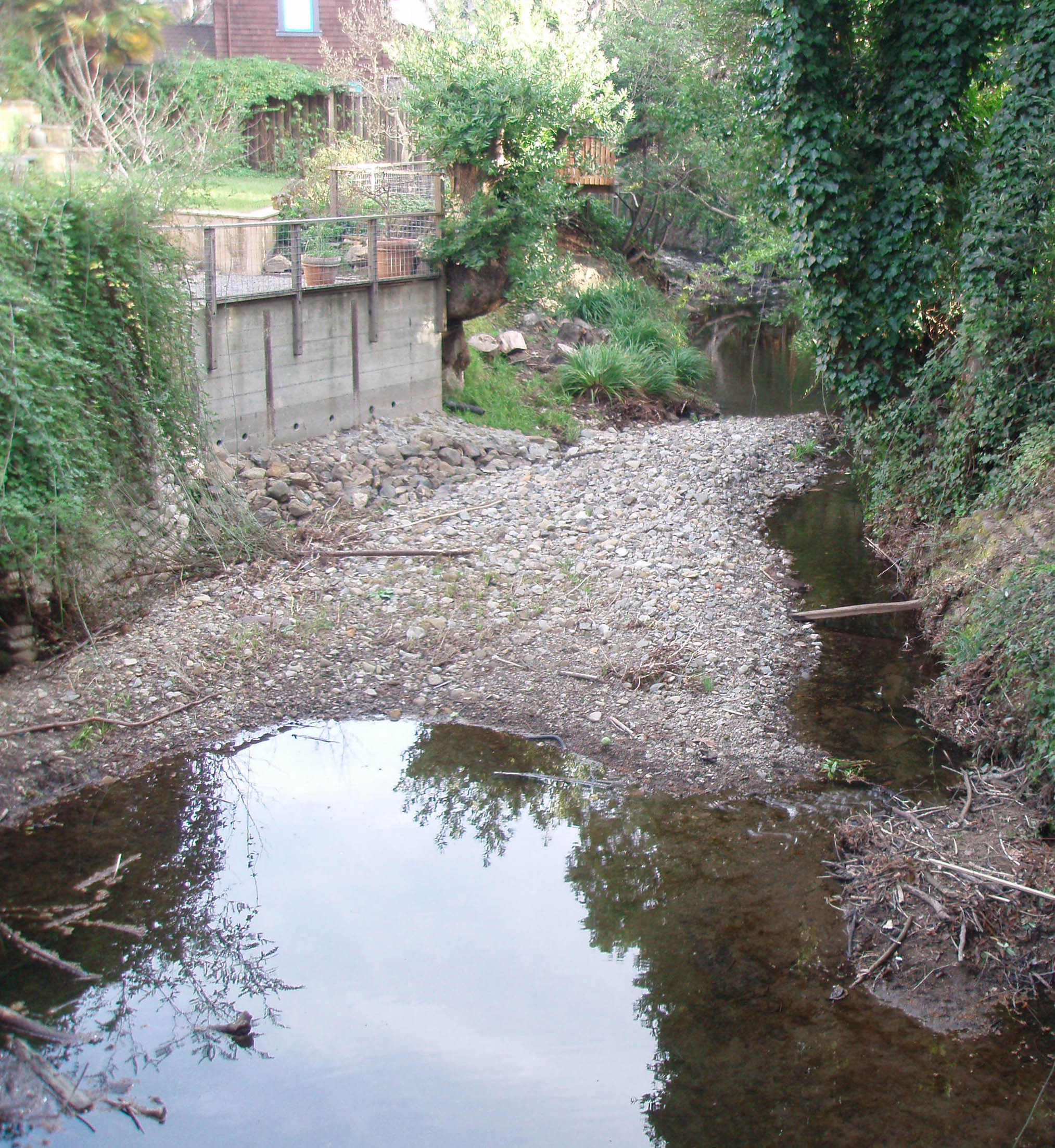
- Arroyo Corte Madera del Presidio near Richardson Bay

- Location of the mouth of Arroyo Corte del Presidio in California
- Etymology: Spanish language

Location
- Country: United States
- State: California
- Region: Marin County
- City: Mill Valley, California

Physical characteristics
- Source: Knob Hill, Marin County
  - location: 2.5 mi (4 km) west of Corte Madera, California
  - coordinates: 37°56′3″N 122°33′52″W
  - elevation: 880 ft (270 m)
- Mouth: Richardson Bay
  - location: 2 mi (3 km) south of Corte Madera, California
  - coordinates: 37°53′27″N 122°31′25″W
  - elevation: 0 ft (0 m)
- Basin size: 8 sq mi (21 km^{2})

Basin features
- Tributaries
  - right: Old Mill Creek

Arroyo Corte Madera del Presidio is a 4.1-mile-long (6.6 km) year-round stream in southern Marin County, California, United States. This watercourse is also known as Corte Madera Creek, although the actual stream of that name flows into San Francisco Bay further north at Point San Quentin. This watercourse has a catchment basin of about 8 square miles (21 km^{2}) and drains the south-eastern slopes of Mount Tamalpais and much of the area in and around the town of Mill Valley; this stream discharges to Richardson Bay.

== History ==
Arroyo Corte Madera del Presidio is named for the Spanish corte de madera meaning "a place where wood is cut". In this case the wood was cut for the building of the Presidio of San Francisco. In 1834, the governor of Alta California José Figueroa awarded to John T. Reed the first land grant in Marin, Rancho Corte Madera del Presidio.

== Watershed ==
The Arroyo Corte Madera del Presidio watershed drains 6.12 square miles (15.9 km^{2}) of the southeast and east flanks of Mount Tamalpais. Arroyo Corte Madera del Presidio is joined by 2.3 miles (3.7 km) long Old Mill Creek on the right in Mill Valley. Old Mill Creek, and its 1 mile (1.6 km) long Cascade Creek tributary, both begin high on the south flank of the east peak of Mount Tamalpais. Cascade Creek has a small dam and reservoir which was built by noted engineer Michael M. O'Shaughnessy for The Tamalpais Land & Water Co. for water supply to Mill Valley.

The other three named tributaries of Arroyo Corte Madera del Presidio are Reed Creek (flows through Homestead Valley), Widow Reed or Widow Creek (flows down East Blithedale Canyon), and Warner Creek

The stream's discharge location, into Richardson Bay occurs within the Mill Valley municipal Bayfront Park. The Arroyo Corte Madera del Presidio enters Richardson Bay from the west via Bothin Marsh.

== Ecology and Conservation ==
Historically, the Arroyo Corte Madera Del Presidio (Mill Valley) watershed was used by coho salmon (Oncorhynchus kisutch) for spawning and rearing. In the late 1800s, coho salmon and steelhead trout were commonly seen swimming up Arroyo Corte Madera del Presidio ("called Widow Creek, Corte Madera Creek and Arroyo Corte Madera Creek, at different times") flowing through Blithedale Canyon. The last record of coho salmon in Marin County tributaries to San Francisco Bay was on September 18, 1981, when Dr. Rob Leidy reported collecting two juveniles from Corte Madera Creek and two from Old Mill Creek. NOAA Fisheries has identified both Corte Madera Creek and Arroyo Corte Madera Del Presidio as critical habitat for coho salmon. In its 2004 "Recovery Strategy for California Coho Salmon" the California Department of Fish and Game recommends restoration of Arroyo Corte Madera's historic coho salmon habitat. This is one of only two San Francisco Bay Area streams considered in the Department's Strategy to be essential to the recovery of coho salmon in California.

Cascade Dam, located on Old Mill Creek 0.4 miles (0.64 km) above the confluence with Cascade Creek, was constructed in the 1870s and is a complete barrier to upstream fish passage to steelhead/rainbow trout (Oncorhynchus mykiss) and coho salmon. A 1965 stream survey indicated presence of steelhead/rainbow trout within 100 ft (30 m) of the dam. The California Department of Fish and Wildlife Stream Inventory Report in 2009 recommended that Arroyo Corte Madera del Presidio be managed as an anadromous, natural production stream for salmonids.

A 1990 study indicated the water quality of upper Richardson Bay below the discharge of Arroyo Corte Madera del Presidio to be impaired by high nutrient and coliform levels; This same study indicated that Arroyo Corte Madera del Presidio is subject to periodic flooding. Slightly further upstream the stream winds through moderately dense single family development, with backyards offering terraces and decks on the banks of Arroyo Corte Madera del Presidio.

A private organization, the Mill Valley Streamkeepers, is active in research and conservation of this creek. Some historic information about Arroyo Corte Madera concerning water quality and fish habitat is found at the KRIS (Klamath Resource Information System) website.

=== Fish stream surveys ===
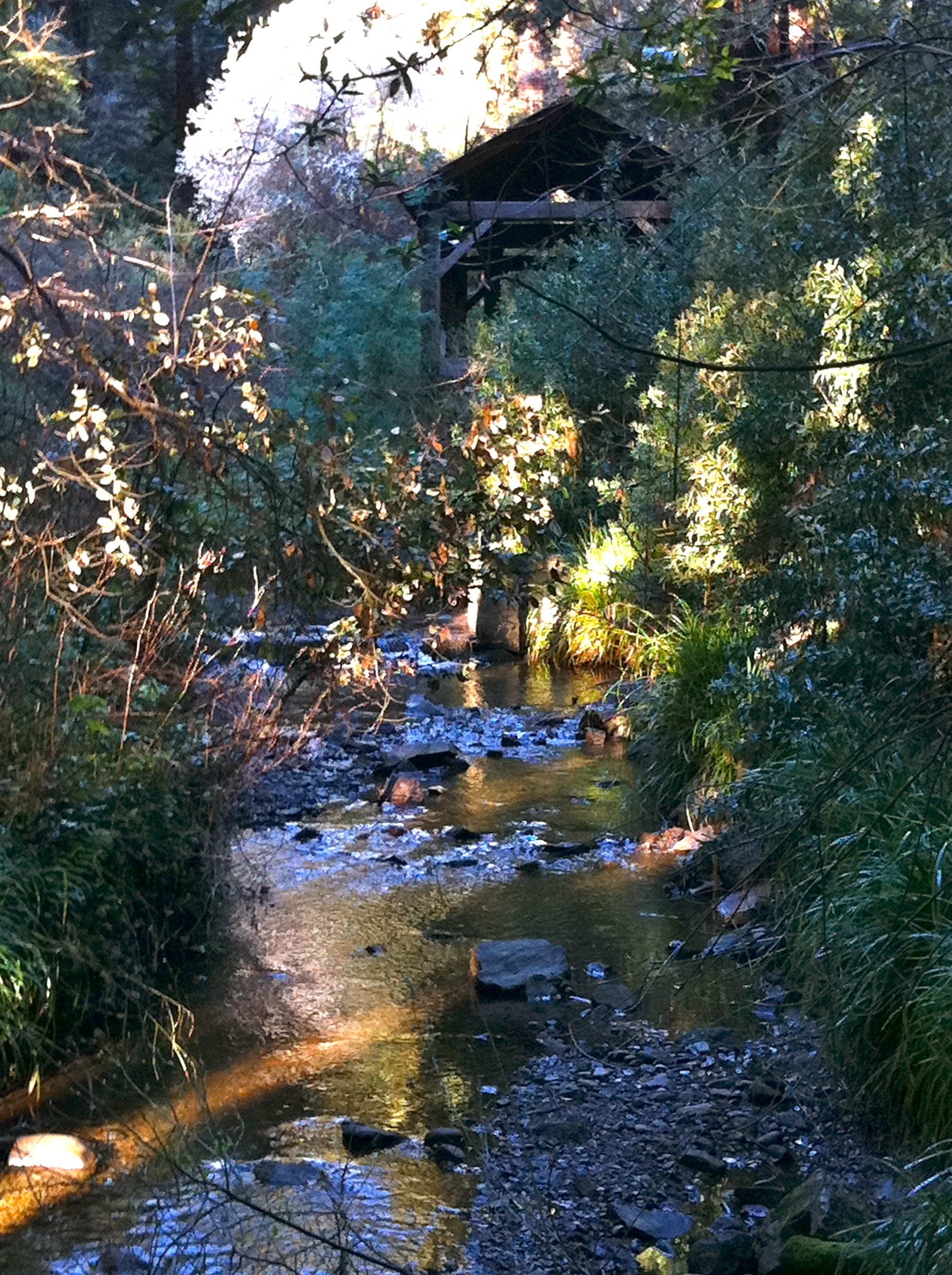
Old Mill Creek tributary with the old mill in the background.

The first recorded stream survey occurred in the year 1946; this survey by the California Department of Fish and Game found some healthy steelhead (Oncorhynchus mykiss) within the stream. The next Department of Fish and Game survey transpired in 1963, finding numerous steelhead of lengths varying between 2 inches (5 cm) and 6 inches (15 cm); this survey concluded that the lower 3.5 miles (6 km) of the creek represented an important nursery and rearing habitat for steelhead and possibly for Coho salmon. The next survey in August 1965 concluded that the habitat was an excellent resource, with deep shaded pools and an average of 75 steelhead per 100 feet (30 m) of lineal stream. In 1984, steelhead were still found to be present. A 1991 stream survey documented the historical presence of Coho salmon. The next survey in 1994 found abundant steelhead, ranging from densities of 0.1 to 0.6 fish per square yard (0.1-0.7 per square meter). The 1997 stream survey found densities of steelhead ranging from seven to twelve fish per 100 lineal feet (30 lineal meters), depending on stream reach.

=== Role of Mill Valley Streamkeepers ===
The Mill Valley Streamkeepers is a private non-profit organization established to promote research, awareness and conservation of streams in the Mill Valley area. This group includes scientists and laymen and has participated in the following specific studies involving Arroyo Corte Madera del Presidio:

- Feasibility Study to Rehabilitate the Fishery Resources of Arroyo Corte Madera del Presidio
- Bio-assessment of four Marin County Watersheds
- Macroinvertebrate Sampling and Identification Study, Arroyo Corte Madera del Presidio and Old Mill Creek
- Salmonoid Habitat Survey and Erosion Survey, Arroyo Corte Madera del Presidio and Old Mill Creek
- Preliminary Fish Barrier Culvert Modifications and Flood Assessment, Arroyo Corte Madera/Old Mill Creek, Mill Valley, California
- Index of Sediment Impairment to Stream Habitat in the Arroyo Corte Madera Del Presidio Watershed, Marin County, California

== Recreation ==
Bayfront Park features many active uses including a bicycle path, walking paths, a dog park and picnic areas. The park also features a pedestrian/bicycle bridge across the tidal portion of Arroyo Corte Madera del Presidio, which is the best single viewing location of the creek in its lower reaches.

== See also ==
- Bay mud
- List of watercourses in the San Francisco Bay Area
- Richardson Bay
