= Richardson Bay =

Arm of San Francisco Bay

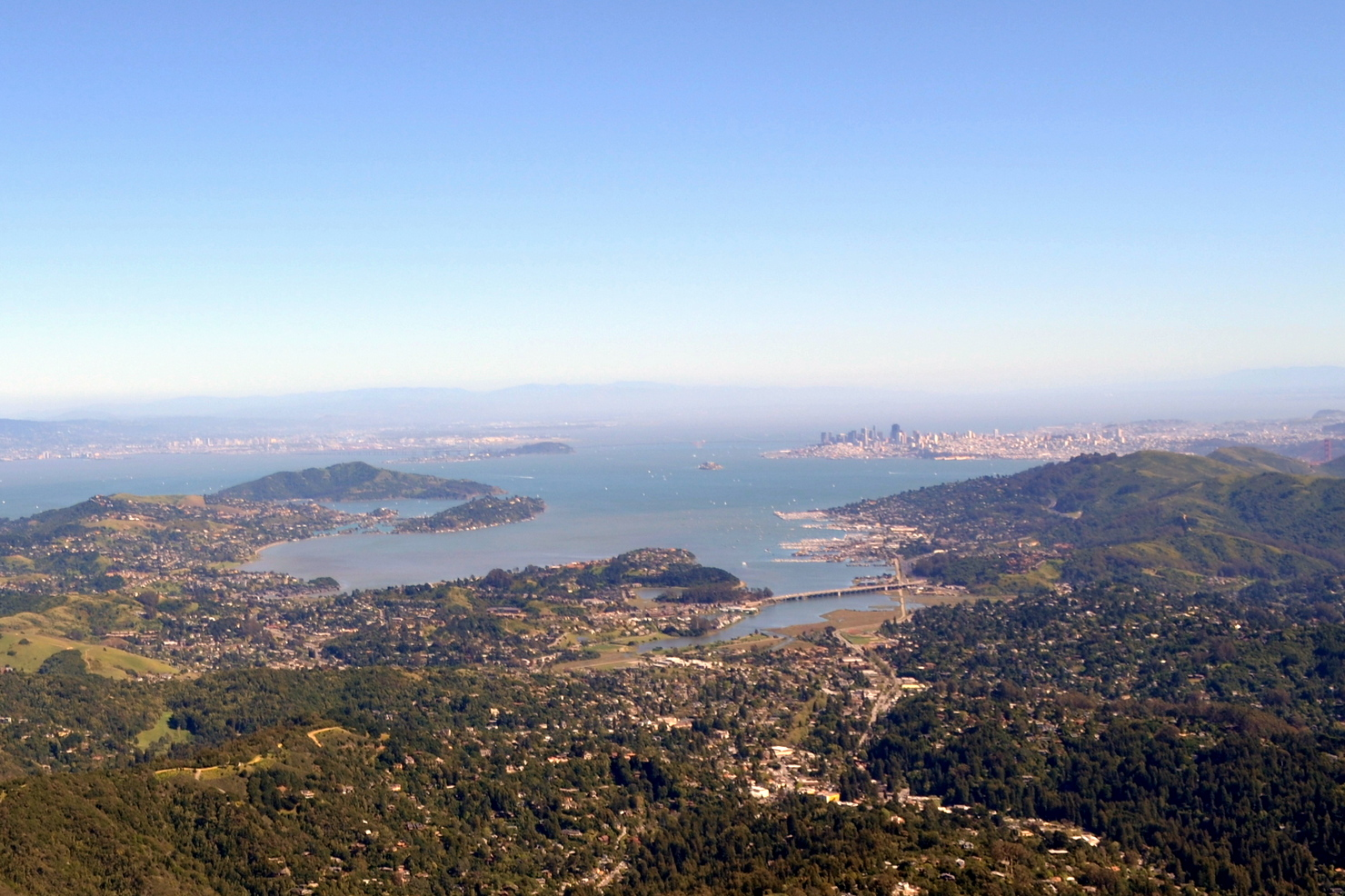
- Richardson Bay viewed from Mount Tamalpais

- Location of Richardson Bay across from San Francisco
- Location: San Francisco Bay
- Coordinates: 37°52′30″N 122°29′00″W
- Type: Bay
- Etymology: William A. Richardson
- Primary inflows: Arroyo Corte Madera del Presidio, Coyote Creek
- Average depth: 20 ft (6.1 m)

Richardson Bay (originally Richardson's Bay) is a shallow, ecologically rich arm of San Francisco Bay. It is managed under by the Richardson Bay Regional Agency, created under a joint powers agreement by the County of Marin, Town of Tiburon, and Cities of Belvedere and Mill Valley. The 911-acre (369 ha) Richardson Bay Sanctuary was acquired in the early 1960s by the National Audubon Society. The bay was named for William A. Richardson, early 19th century sea captain and builder in San Francisco. It contains both Strawberry Spit and Aramburu Island.

In spite of its urbanized periphery, Richardson Bay supports extensive eelgrass areas and sizable undisturbed intertidal habitats. It is a feeding and resting area for a panoply of estuarine and pelagic birds, while its associated marshes and littoral zones support a variety of animal and plant life. Richardson Bay has been designated as an Important Bird Area (IBA), based upon its large number of annual bird visitors and residents, its sightings of California clapper rail and its strategic location on the Pacific Flyway. The bay's waters are subject to a "no discharge" rule to protect the elaborate and fragile ecosystems present, including a complex fishery, diverse mollusk populations and even marine mammals such as the harbor seal.

Owing to its lack of depth and complicated channel structure, Richardson Bay is limited in boating uses to kayaking and small sailing craft. There are extensive hiking and bicycling paths at the bay perimeter, especially in the shore areas of Mill Valley and the town of Tiburon.

== History of the name ==
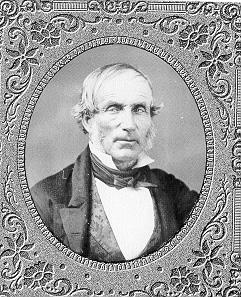
William Richardson

On August 22, 1822, an English whaler, the Orion, put into Yerba Buena Cove in San Francisco for supplies; the captain was William Anthony Richardson, described as tall, fair haired, blue-eyed and young, was sighted by Maria Antonia, daughter of the Commandante of the Presidio of San Francisco, Ygnacio Martinez. Martinez, for whom the town of Martinez is named, decided to invite the Captain to reside with their family. Maria married the captain after he joined the Catholic Church, being baptized "Guillermo Antonio Richardson." This wedding, held at Mission Dolores on May 12, 1826 was the first great Spanish-Anglo Saxon wedding in North America.

Richardson taught carpentry, boat building and navigation at Mission Dolores, served as Captain of the Port of San Francisco, and built the first significant residence in San Francisco, although it was meant to be a trading post. He had charge of several schooners belonging to the Mission Dolores and Mission Santa Clara. Richardson received a 19,500-acre (79 km^{2}) Mexican land grant in 1838, Rancho Saucelito, which is all of the land north of the Golden Gate extending from bay to ocean and ranging north to Mount Tamalpais The grant contained all the land southeast of Mount Tamalpais, and included Redwood Canyon and the lands now within Muir Woods National Monument. Richardson Bay was thus named in the honor of this energetic early settler and builder.

The Tiburon Peninsula on the northeast side of the bay was part of Rancho Corte Madera del Presidio granted to John Thomas Reed in 1834.

According to local sources and period maps, the Bay's original given name was possessive: Richardson's Bay. However, the United States Board on Geographic Names discourages the use of apostrophes in United States place names, which is why the name appears as Richardson Bay in government databases and maps.

== Geology ==
Richardson Bay is developed on surficial sediments of clays, silts and minor sands and gravels deposited in a primarily marine and estuarine environment during periods of previous high stands of water relative to the present shoreline. The bay muds are widespread in San Francisco Bay and, at Richardson Bay, are approximately 80 to 95 feet (24 to 30 meters) deep. The Bay Muds are of Holocene Age (less than 10,000 years of age). They overlie firm alluvial soils which contain two sand layers at 92 and 110 feet (29 and 35 meters), respectively. This section, in turn, overlies shale of the Franciscan Complex, a heterogeneous mixture of sedimentary, igneous and metamorphic rock gathered together in the course of the tectonic evolution of the region from the Late Jurassic to the Middle Miocene. These assemblages of Franciscan rocks are referred to as tectonostratigraphic terrains and two of them, the Central Belt and the Coastal Belt, are in fault contact near Richardson Bay.

== Ecology ==
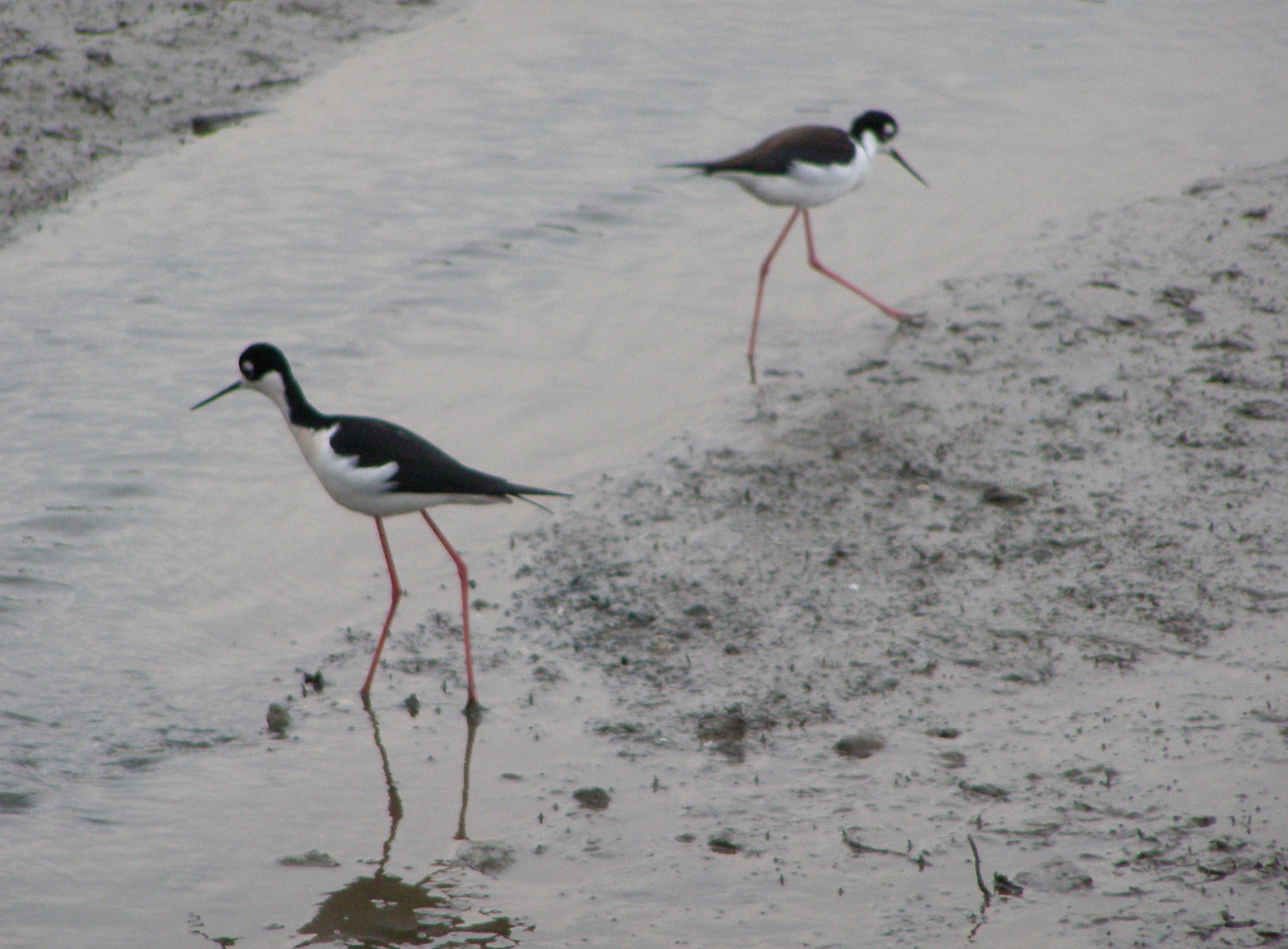
Black-necked stilt foraging in Richardson Bay mudflat

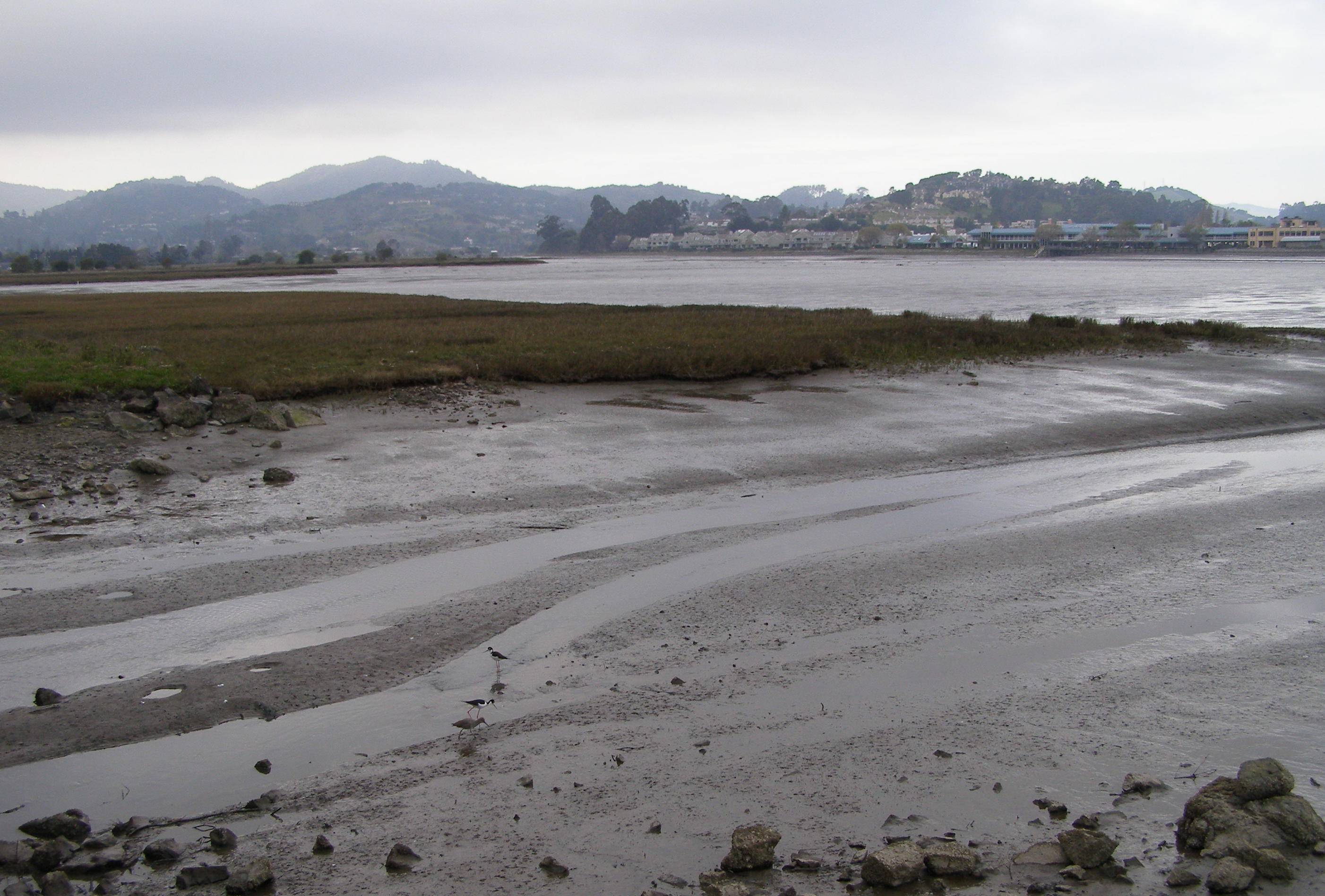
The outlet of Coyote Creek, which drains Tam Valley into upper Richardson's Bay

Richardson Bay is an important ecological area being managed by Audubon California as the Richardson Bay Audubon Center & Sanctuary. There are significant estuarine resources, marsh birdlife, mammalian species and marsh plants.

Birds are abundant in Richardson Bay, with over one million migratory visitors each winter, many of whom utilizing the upper mudflats and Bothin Marsh associated with the area west of the U.S. Route 101. In addition to being designated a high score IBA, Richardson's Bay has been dedicated as a Hemispheric Reserve of the Western Shorebird Network. Migrating birds that winter regularly at Richardson's Bay include least sandpiper, western sandpiper, spotted sandpiper, American avocet, dunlin, marbled godwit, greater yellowlegs, willet, long-billed curlew and dowitchers. A special resident of Bothin Marsh, Blackies' Creek mouth and DeSilva Island is the California clapper rail, a non-migratory endangered species. Beginning in 2014, endangered black oystercatchers have been observed nesting on Aramburu Island.

Common year around residents of the Richardson Bay Sanctuary include great blue heron, snowy egret, and great egret; mallard; red-tailed hawk and turkey vulture; killdeer and western gull; mourning dove and rock dove; Anna's hummingbird. Common residents Passeriformes include scrub jay, American crow, chestnut-backed chickadee, bushtit, Bewick's wren, house sparrow, red-winged blackbird, house finch, California towhee and song sparrow.

Fishery characteristics of Richardson Bay include a Pacific herring fishery and oyster beds. The herring fishing fleet serving all of San Francisco Bay is based in Richardson Bay at the Sausalito harbor. This herring fishing is overseen by the California Department of Fish and Game; the herring population is in a downward trend, although not from excessive fishing pressure with the net techniques in use, but rather from ocean environmental factors. Herring spend most of their lives in the open ocean and come to Richardson Bay and other estuaries for winter spawning in the shallow protected waters. In Richardson Bay their eggs attach to assorted surfaces such as eelgrass, piers or rip rap. After the eggs hatch, the herring larvae consume plankton; before hatching the eggs are subject to predation by gulls at low tide and sturgeon and other assorted estuarine fauna at higher tides.

Regarding the oyster beds, an experimental program is underway as of 2006, in which foreign oyster shells (biologically inert) are bagged and em-placed in underwater locations to serve as larval substrates, in order to assist the native oysters in propagating. Locally oysters are preyed upon by the bat ray and certain crabs.

The extensive mudflats of Richardson Bay provide a rich habitat for marine invertebrates. Many of the species are found elsewhere in San Francisco Bay. Characteristic organisms include burrowing clams, polychaete worms, decapod crustaceans, amphipods, phoronids and sea anemones. A field survey conducted on a broad mudflat along the Strawberry/Belvedere shoreline found species associated with rocks including: bivalves, (Macoma balthica, Mya arenaria and Mytilus edulis); the sea snail Littorina planaxis; the crab Hemigrapsis oregonensis; the isopod Sphaeroma quoyanum; the barnacles Balanus glandula and Balanus amphitrite; the nemertean Lineus ruber; and the anemones Diadumene leucolena and Haliplanella luciae.

Mammals visiting Richardson Bay include the harbor seal, which hauls out on DeSilva Island and on the Tiburon shore near the Richardson Bay Audubon Sanctuary headquarters. The endangered salt marsh harvest mouse is also thought to be present.

Flora include intertidal and upland species. Probably the most notable feature is the extensive eelgrass population at the tideland perimeter of Richardson Bay. This eelgrass occurrence in Richardson Bay is considered one of the most sizeable stands in Northern California, and it is being restored, leading to further extent of this habitat. There is an extensive pickleweed habitat at the western end of the bay, where many acres of mudflat areas are exposed to shorebirds at low tide at the efflux of Pickleweed Inlet. Upland plants found at the perimeter of Richardson's Bay include toyon, coast live oak, California bay, and native California bunch grasses.

On November 7, 2007, there was a large oil spill in the San Francisco Bay. This Cosco Busan oil spill was found to be lethal to herring fry in oiled versus non-oiled sites in Richardson Bay. This spill has greatly affected the organisms in the bay.

== Modern history ==
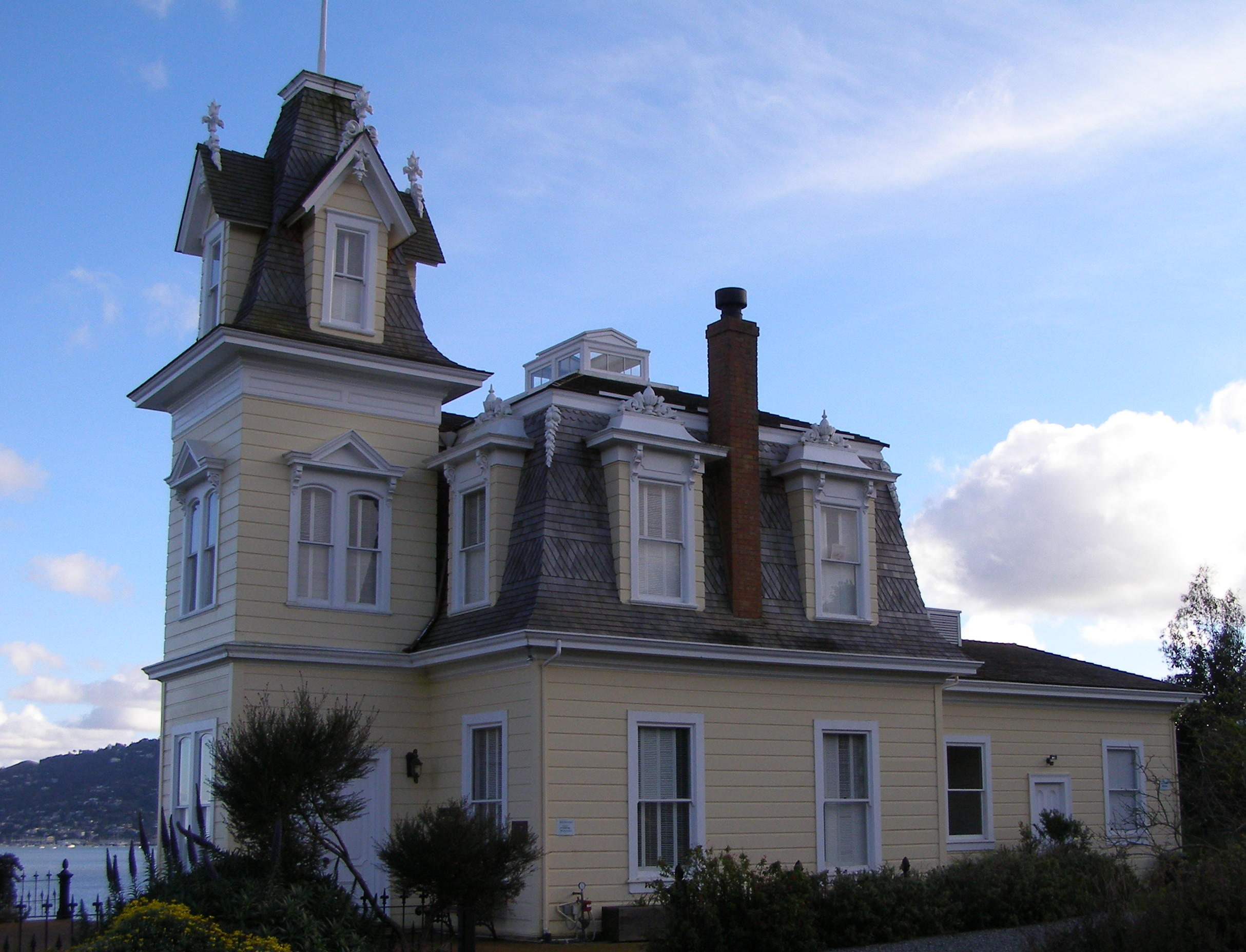
Lyford House built 1876

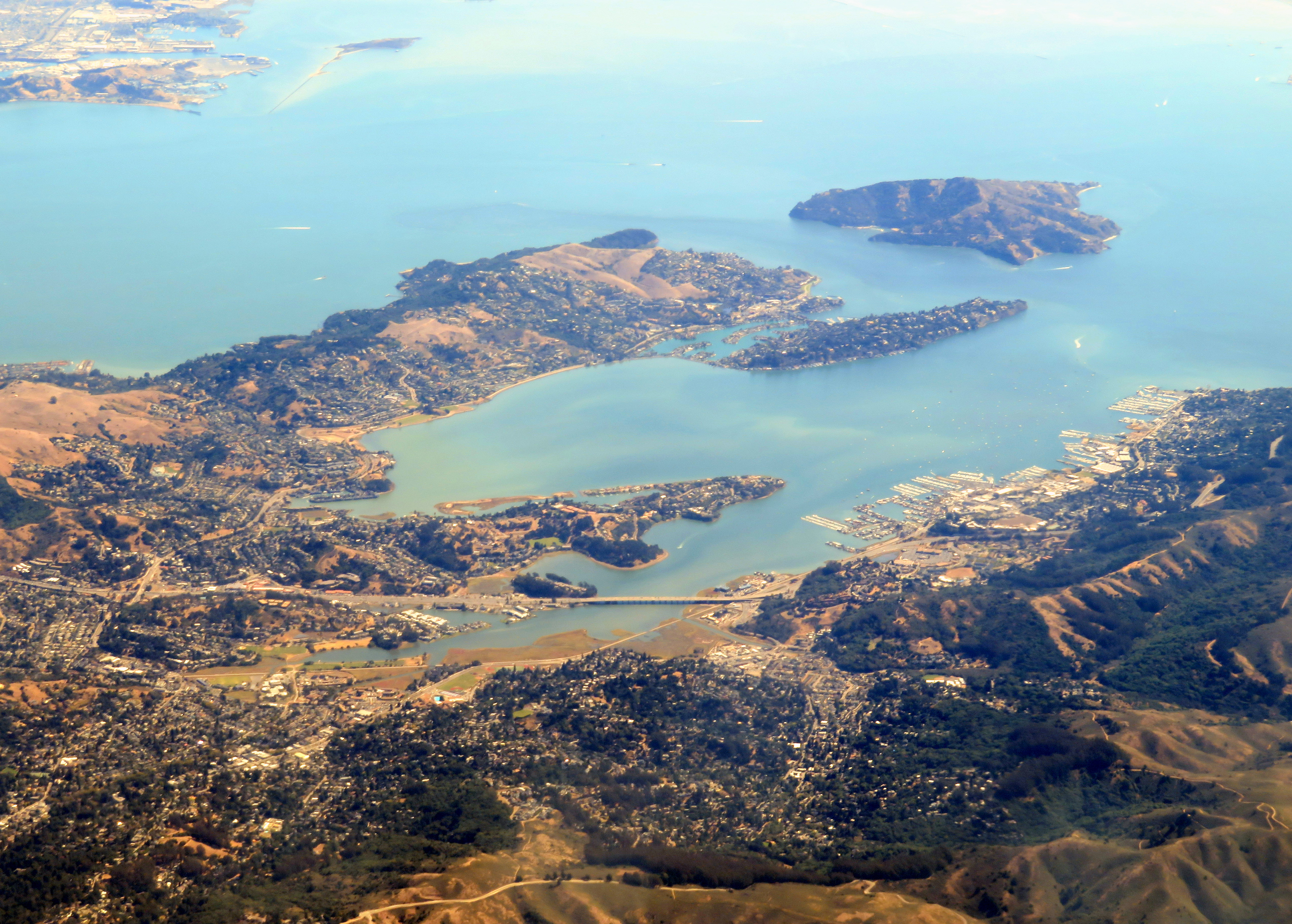
An aerial photograph of Richardson Bay, taken from the west, in September 2019

Through the latter 19th century and early 20th century, the land fronting on Richardson Bay was extensively subdivided into public and private ownership encompassing thousands of parcels. The cities of Tiburon, Mill Valley, Belvedere and Sausalito have enacted strong shoreline development policies to protect the perimeter of Richardson Bay, even though considerable development has occurred. The Audubon Society manages the whole Richardson Bay Sanctuary subject to governance by the Joint Powers Agency of the four peripheral cities.

One parcel deeded from Reed to Rosie Verall, who worked for the Reed family, is now the core of the Audubon Richardson Bay Sanctuary. Verall donated this land of approximately 13 acres (5.3 ha) to be held in permanent trust as a wildlife sanctuary. The Audubon Society purchased this upland parcel along with the entirety of the subtidal and intertidal lands of Richardson Bay in 1960. The Lyford House built in 1876 occupies the Verall parcel, even though the house was built at a different location in the vicinity known as Strawberry Point. The house is furnished in period style and is used by the National Audubon Society for special functions and events.

As of 2019, the bay contains about one hundred people who live on boats one-quarter mile from the shore.

== Hydrology and boating data ==
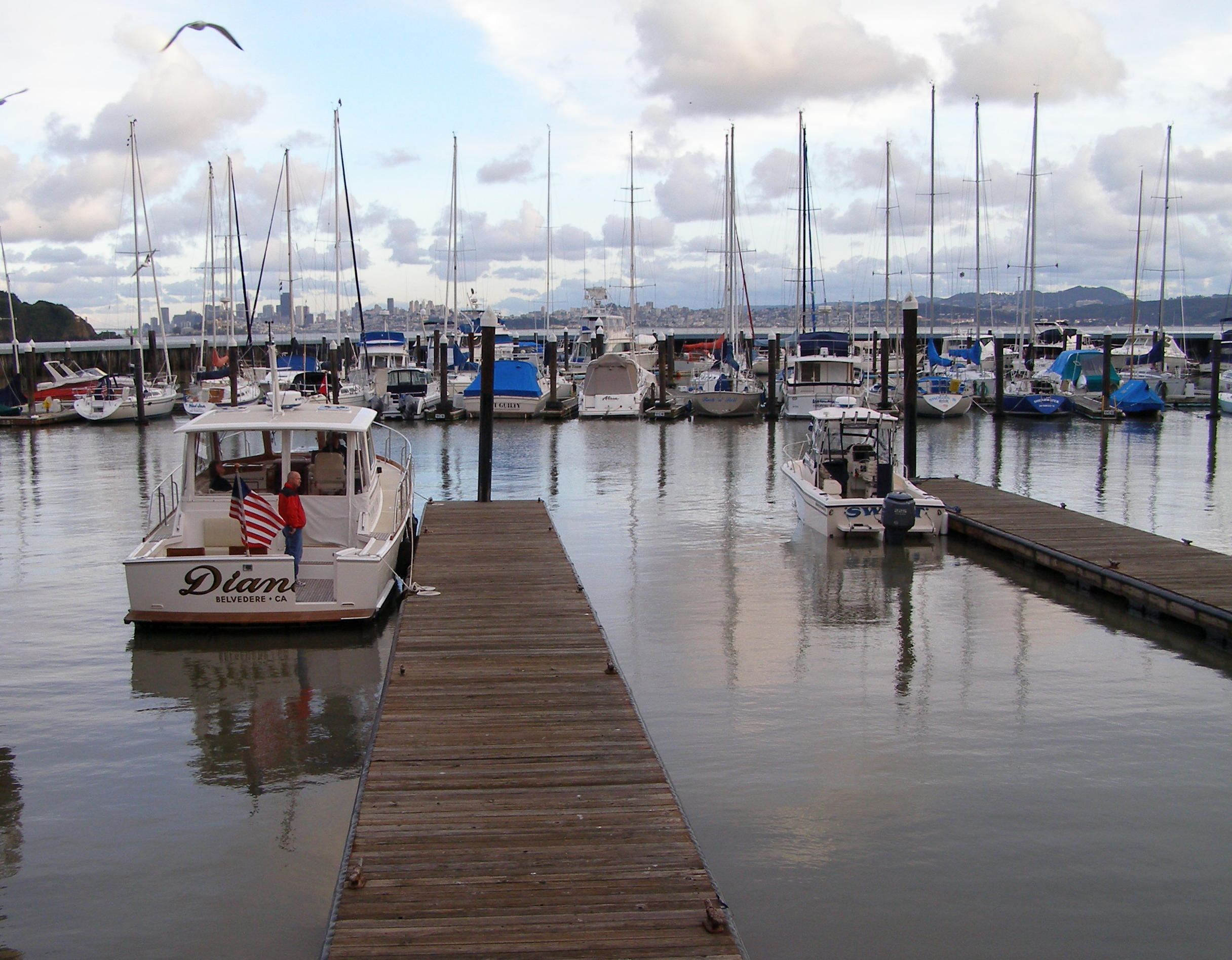
Tiburon harbor looking toward San Francisco

Richardson bay joins San Francisco Bay where the water depth becomes 20 feet (6 m), demarcated by a highly irregular boundary connecting the southern end of the Sausalito Marina] with the southern tip of Belvedere, sometimes called Peninsula Point. At this line of demarcation the depth increases rapidly on the San Francisco Bay side, becoming 100 feet (30 m) in depth almost immediately. This portion of San Francisco Bay, also known as Raccoon Strait, possesses highly turbulent waters. Boating in Richardson Bay is limited to small sailing craft and kayaks due to limited draft available, and nearly 900 acres of the bay is closed for six months during the winter each year to provide protection for the ecological system, particularly migratory waterbirds.

Richardson Bay receives inflow from numerous seasonal small unnamed streams and three major streams: Arroyo Corte Madera del Presidio which receives the surface runoff from the steep southeast slopes of Mount Tamalpais; Pickleweed Inlet; and Coyote Creek (Marin County), which receives the runoff from the slopes to the west of Richardson Bay. These streams empty into Richardson Bay from the northwest. Arroyo Corte Madera del Presidio and Coyote Creek are intermittent in flow.

== Richardson Bay Audubon Center & Sanctuary ==
The National Audubon Society operates a nature center in Tiburon that offers adult and children's nature programs, including summer camp, school science programs, birthday and family events, lectures, guided walks, environmental education workshops, Bay Shore Studies docent programs and volunteer projects. Recent efforts included renovation of the human-made islands Aramburu, Pickleweed, and Unnamed to enhance their value as bird refuges.

== See also ==
- Arroyo Corte Madera del Presidio
- Coyote Creek
- Old Mill Creek
- Ring Mountain
- Strawberry Lagoon
