= Bothin Marsh =

Coordinates: 37.888537°N 122.523864°W

Bothin Marsh is a 106 acres (43 ha) wetland in Marin County, California. Parts of the wetlands are in the Bothin Marsh Open Space Preserve, a regional park.

== Natural history ==
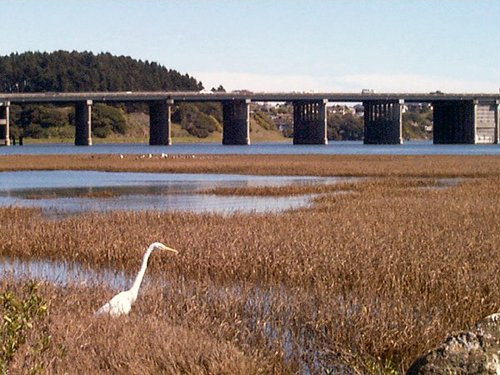
A great egret in Bothin Marsh, with Richardson Bay Bridge in the background.

The marsh, positioned at the northern arm of Richardson Bay is fed by Arroyo Corte Madera del Presidio. Bothin Marsh is situated not far from Triangle Marsh, although the latter is situated on the northern edge of the Tiburon Peninsula. It is likely that Native Americans gathered estuarine resources from Bothin Marsh, as they did from nearby Triangle Marsh.

== History ==
Jo Julin was instrumental in the preservation of Bothin Marsh in the early 1970s, when developers attempted to drain the marsh in order to begin construction.

Today the Bothin Marsh Open Space Preserve provides habitat for hundreds of native bird and wildlife species, including the endangered salt marsh harvest mouse and Ridgway's rail. It's also a resting stop for over 400 species of migratory birds traveling on the Pacific Flyway. Salicornia virginica is the persuasive species is found adjacent to where the salinity of sediments is lower.

The managers of Bothin Marsh Open Space Preserve have the responsibility of protecting this ecologically dense space. Not only does this marsh support a variety of unique plants and animals native to the bay, it also provides recreational purposes for visitors and local residents. Even though there are efforts being put in place to protect this landscape, due to climate change, the rise in sea level is flooding the Bay Trail and the marsh. In addition to marsh, the Mill Valley-Sausalito Multiuse Pathway will also be affected by the flooding and sea level rise of 10 in (250 mm). In order to preserve the pathway, local conservation groups have planned to work around the given conditions. Elevating and realigning a segment of the Bay Trail along the south Bothin Marsh, creating ectosome slopes with thin-lift sediments, connecting the Coyote Creek and the Bothing Marsh with the help of new channels, and re-using dredged material along with multiple other plans.
