= Sausalito Marin City School District =

School district in California

Coordinates: 37.863894°N 122.500992°W

Address
- 200 Phillips Drive Marin City, Marin County, California, 94965; United States

District information
- Type: Public elementary school
- Motto: Students First, Belonging & Engagement, Accountability
- Grades: K–8
- School board: Lauren Walters, President (2022–); Danielle Diego, Vice President (2024–); Jamal Graham, Clerk (2026–, provisional); Bonnie Hough (2018–)
- Schools: Martin Luther King, Jr. Academy
- NCES District ID: 0636000
- District ID: CA-2165474
- Affiliation: ACS WASC

Students and staff
- Students: 265 (2024–25)
- Teachers: 25.4
- Staff: 37.3
- Student–teacher ratio: 21.97

Other information
- Dashboard: CAS Performance Review
- SARCs: https://ca50000199.schoolwires.net/Page/75
- Website: www.smcsd.org

Sausalito Marin City School District (SMCSD) is a public school district serving Sausalito and the unincorporated area of Marin City in Marin County, California. The school's administrative offices are in the former Martin Luther King Jr. Academy facility in Marin City. Previously the administrative offices were in Bayside Elementary School in Sausalito.

As of the 2018–19 school year, the district had 558 students at its two schools. It now has one school, with one campus for preschool, elementary, and middle school in Sausalito, serving 263 students in the 2025-26 school year.

== History ==
During much of the district's history, the demographics were evenly split between White students and African-American students. Most of the military families from nearby bases, who were mostly White, sent their children to Sausalito public schools. After the Cold War ended, the United States Department of Defense closed Fort Baker, Fort Barry, and the Presidio of San Francisco. Over 100 students left the school district in one period after the military transfers. By then, many families in Sausalito were sending children to private schools instead of public schools. By 1996 80% of the students were African American, and most of the district's students were poor. Despite the district's high student spending and small class sizes, test scores were low.

In 1965, Mill Valley Public School District proposed renting and operating four classrooms at Bayside to promote racial integration and ease overcrowding in existing Mill Valley schools.

In 1997 the Marin County Civil Grand Jury published a report indicating that, despite the ample funding, the district had poor performance and violence. Between that year and 2011 the district had experienced, on six occasions, a conflict like a member of the board of trustees or a superintendent leaving without notice which required action from the Marin County Office of Education.

In 2006 Jennifer Gollan and Don Speich of the Marin Independent Journal said "Poor academic achievement in the Sausalito Marin City School District has rendered the concept of public neighborhood schools largely meaningless as dozens of children in the district, both black and white, flock to private schools."

A 2008 followup to the county report indicated improvements and suggested that the Bayside and Martin Luther King schools be returned to K-8 configurations.

In 2011 Rob Rogers of the Marin Independent Journal said that the district continually had, of all of the Marin County school districts, the lowest test scores. That year the University of Southern California's Rossier School of Education named Willow Creek Academy one of the top charter schools in California.

On Thursday January 21, 2014, the board voted to make the Marin City school a K-8 and to close Bayside, having its buildings be used by the Willow Creek charter school, which will use the Bayside campus to house three additional classrooms. The consolidation of Bayside into MLK will be in effect in the northern hemisphere fall of 2013.

In 2014 the district community and administration stated that there is no will to merge with another school district since the community does not wish to lose local control. At the time the district planned on making some cuts to educational services due to costs, despite having $30,000 per student per year due to a tax loophole.

In 2018 the office of the Attorney General of California had accused the Sausalito Marin City district of racially discriminating by keeping the two different schools open. The school board changed composition after elections in November 2018, and decided to reach an agreement with the Office of the Attorney General; three of the board members were viewed as being in favor of helping the Bayside MLK School. In August 2019 the State of California's courts ordered the Sausalito district to racially desegregate. In 2021 Willow Creek consolidated into the Martin Luther King School in Marin City.

Itoco Garcia became the superintendent in 2019. He was in this capacity until the end of the calendar year of 2022.

== Leadership ==
=== Superintendent ===
LaResha Huffman served as superintendent from 2023 to 2026. In February 2026, the board voted 3–2 to approve a two-year contract extension, with trustees Lauren Walters and Danielle Diego voting in opposition. In April 2026, a draft settlement agreement between Huffman and the district became public after it was inadvertently included in a publicly posted board agenda.

The draft document, titled "agreement and general release," indicated that Huffman had alleged a hostile work environment, with the document stating the allegations began on November 13, 2025, the date on which union members presented results of a joint staff survey to the board. The survey reported that 80% of respondents were dissatisfied with the administration. The draft proposed that Huffman would waive harassment and discrimination claims against the district in exchange for a contract extension. Following the document's release, the Sausalito District Teachers Association filed a California Public Records Act request seeking related communications.

In June 2026, the board and Huffman reached a settlement nullifying the extension. Huffman's tenure ended June 30, 2026. Under the terms of the settlement, she received one year's severance pay at her base salary of $241,020, along with health benefits through spring 2027, and waived the right to pursue litigation against the district. Huffman's tenure ended June 30, 2026. She subsequently was appointed superintendent of the American Indian Model Schools, a K–12 charter district in Oakland, effective July 20, 2026.

On June 29, 2026, the board voted 4–0 to retain Valerie Pitts as interim superintendent on a contract basis through the Marin County Office of Education. Pitts began her career as a teacher with San Rafael City Schools in 1979. She served as superintendent of the Larkspur-Corte Madera School District for approximately 12 years before retiring in 2017, and also served as part-time superintendent of SMCSD between 2011 and 2013. She previously served as interim superintendent of the Miller Creek School District in 2024.

=== Board of Trustees ===
As of July 2026, the board consists of:

- Bonnie Hough
- Lauren Walters, President
- Danielle Diego, Vice President
- Jamal Graham, Clerk (provisional appointee)

Rebecca Lytle, elected in November 2024 and serving as Vice President, resigned effective May 5, 2026 for personal and family reasons, less than halfway through a four-year term set to expire in November 2028. Jamal Graham, a former district employee of ten years most recently serving as executive assistant in the superintendent's office, was unanimously appointed to the provisional seat in May 2026 following a public interview process.

Caroline Tiziani, board president and a supporter of Huffman, resigned on June 26, 2026, citing family commitments. Tiziani had served approximately three and a half years as a trustee. Lauren Walters was elected board president the day before Tiziani's resignation. Danielle Diego was elected vice president, and Jamal Graham was elected clerk. As of July 2026, the board had not decided whether to fill Tiziani's seat by appointment or leave it vacant until the November 3, 2026, election.

=== Labor relations ===
The Sausalito District Teachers Association conducted three consecutive bargaining cycles between 2023 and 2026, each of which proceeded beyond initial sessions. In 2023–24, the parties reached a last-minute settlement following fact-finding, the final step in the state mediation process. In 2024–25, mediation extended throughout the summer before an agreement was reached. In 2025–26, the parties failed to reach agreement after four bargaining sessions and proceeded to state mediation, with a first session failing to produce an agreement in May 2026. A tentative agreement for 2026–27 was reached in June 2026, providing a 3% salary increase effective July 1, a one-time payment of $1,500 per member, and increases in some stipends and extra duty pay.

Members cast votes of no confidence in Superintendent Huffman on at least two occasions. A November 2025 joint staff survey by the teachers and classified workers unions indicated approximately 80% of respondents were dissatisfied with the administration and sought new leadership when Huffman's contract expired.

Following the release of a draft settlement agreement through the April 14, 2026 board agenda, the teachers association filed a California Public Records Act request seeking communications related to Huffman's allegations of harassment, discrimination and a hostile work environment. Of 122 pages of records released by the district in response, all were from 2026; no records from 2025 were provided, as the union had requested.

The union also raised questions about the approval process for Huffman's two-year contract extension. According to public records, the contract extension was not attached to the board agenda when it was approved by a 3–2 vote in February 2026. When a written contract was subsequently executed in April, Huffman's base salary was listed at $241,020 with a 3% annual cost-of-living adjustment, differing from the February approval which had specified a base salary of $224,438 tied to increases approved for all certificated staff.

== Staff ==
The District had 19.0 full-time-equivalent classroom teachers (2.0 kindergarten and 17.0 elementary). The other 25.0 staff included 11.5 instructional aides or coordinators, 8 district and school administrators, and 5.5 support staff. There were no guidance counselors or library staff.

== Operations ==
It includes Sausalito, Marin City, and a section of Tamalpais-Homestead Valley.

In 2015 it became the first school district in the United States to only serve organic and genetically modified organism-free food. A pilot program to only serve that kind of food was enacted at Bayside MLK in 2013.

The District budget as of 2004-05 was $5,333,000, or $17,203 per student. Revenue sources were 6% federal, 81% local, and 13% state.

=== School Buildings Improvement Bond ===
On November 2, 2004, District voters approved Measure I, the School Improvement Bond of 2004, a $15.9 million bond measure that authorizes funding for repairs, upgrades, and new construction projects to the three schools in the District.

The District contracted with the Professional Projects Advisory Group, VBN Architects and Turner Construction to prepare a detailed timeline and budget for construction.

== Community demographics ==
In 2019 the school district had a total of 465 students, with 361 at Willow Creek and 104 at Bayside MLK. In the former, the student body was 42% white, 27% Latino, and 10% African-American.

In 2000, the attendance area had a total population under age 18 of 1,265, of which 101 (8.0%) were Hispanic.

The racial composition was

- White alone: 618 (48.9%)
- Black or African American alone: 395 (31.2%)
- American Indian or Alaska Native alone: 8 (0.6%)
- Asian alone: 79 (6.2%)
- Hawaiian or other Pacific Islander alone: 2 (0.2%)
- Some other race alone: 55 (4.3%)
- Population of two or more races: 108 (8.5%)

== Schools ==
Martin Luther King, Jr. Academy

Location
- 636 Nevada St. Sausalito, California 94965

Information
- School type: Public, elementary school
- Motto: Panther Pride
- School number: NCES 063600006162; CDS CA-2165474-6024889
- Principal: Amy Hale
- Staff: 9.4
- Grades: K-8 (formerly 7–8)
- Enrollment: 119 (2018-19)
- Language: English
- Mascot: Panther
- Feeder schools: formerly: Bayside Elementary School
- Website: https://www.smcsd.org/
- Martin Luther King, Jr. Academy Information at the National Center for Education Statistics

=== Dr. Martin Luther King Jr. Academy ===
Dr. Martin Luther King Jr. Academy is located at 636 Nevada Street, Sausalito, California 94965. The school serves approximately 265 students in transitional kindergarten through eighth grade. Amy Hale has served as principal since August 2025.

A new campus opened in January 2026 following two years of construction. The $33 million project was financed by a bond measure approved by voters in Sausalito and Marin City in 2020. The new campus comprises four main buildings containing ten classrooms, conference rooms, a library, an art room that also functions as a science, technology, engineering and mathematics center, and administrative office space. Older buildings on the site were renovated to house transitional kindergarten and kindergarten classrooms, a multipurpose room, and middle school classrooms. The consolidation brought all district students onto a single campus in Sausalito for the first time.

The district also holds a federal grant to restore Willow Creek, a stream that runs beneath the campus, and plans to demolish part of the old campus to create a new athletic field.

Student demographics
The majority of the students are Black or African American. Enrollment by race or ethnicity and by gender are as follows:

- American Indian/Alaskan: 0 (0.0%)
- Asian: 1 (2.0%)
- Black: 40 (78.4%)
- Hispanic: 5 (9.8%)
- White: 4 (7.8%)
- Male: 24 (47.1%)
- Female: 26 (52.9%)

Martin Luther King Jr.is a Title I School, with a School-Wide Program. The majority of the students are eligible for subsidized meals: 92.% for free lunch or reduced-price lunch. There are no migrant students.

Ethnicity History
Year	Total	African	Native	Asian	Filipino	Latino	Pacific	White	2+	?
2019	119	48.70%	0.80%	3.40%	0.80%	30.30%	0.00%	6.70%	7.60%	1.70%
2018	127	50.40%	0.00%	7.10%	1.60%	27.60%	0.00%	3.90%	9.40%	0.00%
2017	161	50.90%	0.00%	8.70%	2.50%	29.20%	0.00%	5.00%	3.70%	0.00%
2016	140	43.60%	0.00%	10.00%	2.90%	30.70%	0.00%	8.60%	3.60%	0.70%
2015	160	50.00%	0.00%	6.30%	2.50%	31.90%	0.60%	4.40%	3.80%	0.60%
2014	145	52.41%	0.00%	7.59%	3.45%	26.21%	1.38%	5.52%	3.45%	0.00%
2013	127	53.54%	0.00%	7.09%	4.72%	21.26%	0.79%	3.15%	3.15%	0.79%
2012	138	60.87%	0.72%	3.62%	2.17%	18.84%	2.17%	6.52%	3.62%	0.00%
2011	163	60.12%	0.61%	6.13%	2.45%	20.86%	3.68%	4.91%	3.07%	0.61%
2010	131	73.28%	0.76%	6.87%	2.29%	29.77%	2.29%	4.58%	0.76%	3.82%
2009	177	62.71%	0.56%	5.08%	0.56%	22.60%	1.13%	1.69%	5.65%	0.00%
2008	126	76.19%	0.00%	5.56%	0.00%	14.29%	0.00%	0.79%	3.17%	0.00%
2007	114	72.81%	0.00%	4.39%	0.00%	14.91%	0.88%	3.51%	0.00%	0.00%
2006	147	77.55%	0.00%	5.44%	0.00%	10.20%	0.00%	4.76%	0.00%	0.00%
2005	157	75.80%	3.82%	0.64%	0.00%	12.74%	0.00%	6.37%	0.00%	0.00%
2004	207	66.67%	0.00%	2.42%	0.97%	16.91%	0.00%	5.31%	0.00%	0.00%
2003	191	70.16%	0.00%	1.57%	1.05%	16.75%	0.52%	8.90%	0.00%	0.00%
2002	226	61.50%	0.00%	1.33%	0.44%	15.04%	0.00%	16.37%	0.00%	0.00%
2001	159	62.26%	0.00%	6.29%	0.00%	13.84%	0.63%	15.72%	0.00%	0.00%
2000	276	61.96%	0.00%	5.43%	0.00%	10.14%	0.00%	19.93%	0.00%	0.00%
1999	263	63.88%	0.00%	4.18%	0.00%	11.03%	1.14%	18.63%	0.00%	0.00%
1998	256	68.36%	2.34%	3.91%	0.00%	7.42%	0.00%	17.97%	0.00%	0.00%
1997	248	76.21%	0.40%	3.23%	0.00%	3.63%	0.00%	16.53%	0.00%	0.00%
1996	262	66.41%	0.38%	3.44%	0.00%	5.34%	0.00%	24.43%	0.00%	0.00%
1995	288	58.68%	1.04%	2.08%	0.00%	6.25%	0.00%	31.94%	0.00%	0.00%
1994	307	51.14%	0.33%	2.28%	0.00%	4.89%	0.00%	41.37%	0.00%	0.00%

The statistics in the table include the combined demographics from Bayside Element and MLK Jr. Academy which were separate schools until 2013. The data is combined to best visualize the history as it relates to the current combined school.

== Former schools ==
=== Bayside Elementary School ===
Bayside Elementary School had an enrollment of 106 students in kindergarten through sixth grade. With 9.0 full-time-equivalent teachers, Bayside has a student-teacher ratio of 11.8. The campus is located in the urban fringe of a large city. Bayside is neither a charter or magnet school.

Student demographics
The majority of the students were Black or African American. Enrollment by race or ethnicity and by gender were as follows:

- Amererican Indian/Alaskan: 6 (5.7%)
- Asian: 0 (0%)
- Black: 79 (74.5%)
- Hispanic: 15 (14.2%)
- White: 6 (5.7%)
- Male: 54 (50.9%)
- Female: 52 (49.1%)

Bayside was a Title I School, with a School-Wide Program. The majority of the students are eligible for subsidized meals: 74.5% for free lunch and 7.5% for reduced-price lunch. There are no migrant students.

=== Willow Creek Academy ===
(See article on Willow Creek Academy.)

Consolidated into MLK School in 2021.

== See also ==
- Non-high school district
