= Myron Spaulding =

American architect

- Born: October 28, 1905; Eureka, California U.S.
- Died: September 11, 2000 (aged 94); Sausalito, California
- Occupations: Boat designer and builder, sailboat racer, concert violinist
- Known for: Boat design and building, sailboat racing
- Spouse: Gladys Spaulding

Myron Spaulding (October 28, 1905 – September 11, 2000) was an American sailor, yacht designer and builder and concert violinist in Sausalito, California.

== Life ==
Myron Spaulding was well known on the Sausalito waterfront in the mid and late 1900s, and exerted a strong influence on San Francisco Bay sailors during the days when boats were made of wood and built locally by expert craftsmen. An accomplished concert violinist, Myron Spaulding performed professionally for many years, including with the San Francisco Symphony. It was, however, as a sailboat designer, builder and sailor, that Spaulding left his mark on the Bay Area.

Spaulding moved to San Francisco, California as a boy in 1915. He received his credential in naval architecture and boatbuilding from the Polytechnic High School in San Francisco in 1923, and designed and built his first small boat while in school. It was there that he earned an additional degree in music, playing the violin. Following graduation, Spaulding played violin in the Fox Theatre's vaudeville orchestra, for silent movie houses, for the ballet, and eventually earned a seat with the San Francisco Symphony and performed with them until 1957. At the same time, he was racing and winning several class championships in the Bird class, Stars and 6-Meters. He also participated in six TransPacific races from San Francisco to Honolulu. The highlight of his racing career was winning the 1936 TransPac as skipper of the famous Sparkman & Stephens-designed 52-foot (16 m) yawl Dorade. Spaulding opened a naval architecture office in San Francisco before World War II. His first significant design was the 20-foot (6.1 m) Clipper. In addition to the Clipper class, he created the Spaulding 33, which can still be seen on San Francisco Bay, as well as notable custom boats, including the 50-foot (15 m) yawl Suomi and the 45-foot (14 m) yawl Chrysopyle.

During World War II, he worked at the Madden and Lewis Company shipyard in Sausalito building 60-foot (18 m) tow boats and 110-foot (34 m) subchasers, then spent a couple of years as a marine surveyor before leasing property near McNear's Beach in the late 1940s, where he repaired boats, continued with survey work and designed and built the 36-foot (11 m) Buoyant Girl. After losing his lease to make way for development, he returned to Sausalito in 1951 and bought the present waterfront site of Spaulding Boatworks at the foot of Gate Five Road.

Myron Spaulding died in the fall of 2000 at the age of 94. Myron Spaulding's widow, Gladys, died a little more than a year and a half later and left the Spaulding Boatworks in charitable trust, with instructions for the trustees to form a non-profit corporation, named the Spaulding Wooden Boat Center (SWBC). Today, the SWBC is a working and living museum, with the mission to restore and return to active use significant, historic wooden sailing vessels; preserve and enhance its working boatyard; create a place where people can gather to use, enjoy, and learn about wooden boats; and educate others about wooden boat building skills, traditions and values.

Myron Spaulding's design collection is at the San Francisco Maritime National Historic Park.

== Boats designed ==
- Nautigal. Custom 38-foot (12 m) sloop. Built in 1938.
- Suomi. Custom 50-foot (15 m) yawl. Built in 1947.
- Lark III. Custom 34-foot (10 m) sloop.
- Buoyant Girl. Custom 37-foot (11 m). Built in 1949. Model of boat is in Commodore's Room at San Francisco Yacht Club in Belvedere, California.
- Clipper class 20-foot (6.1 m) sloops (63 built)
- Spaulding 33 (9 built, possibly more)
- Chrysopyle Custom 45-foot (14 m) yawl. Built in 1961.
- Spaulding 28 Arete, (One boat built. Started in 1958 and completed in 2006)

== Sailboat races ==
- 1936 Transpacific Yacht Race as master and navigator of 52-foot (16 m) yawl Dorade. First, first in class and first overall. (D:H:M:S: Elapsed: 13:07:20:04; Corrected: 11:03:29:44)
- Five additional Transpacs as sailing master and/or navigator.
- 1939 Successfully defended San Francisco Perpetual Trophy. 6-meter Saga of St. Francis Yacht Club in San Francisco defeated 6-meter Rebel of Los Angeles Yacht Club.
- 1946 Successfully defended San Francisco Perpetual Trophy. 8-meter Hussy of Corinthian Yacht Club in Tiburon defeated the 46-foot (14 m) sloop Amorita of Newport Harbor Yacht Club.

== Reputation & legacy ==
By the time I had finished my bookends, that guy had built a boat.

— Prescott Sullivan, classmate in woodshop class at Polytechnic High School in San Francisco, Sail West

To Spaulding boats were life: he loved the design of them, loved to build them and loved to sail them. He made himself into an expert on how the forces of wind and currents and the sea affect boats and their performance, and made himself a master of design. His aim was to build sailing vessels that would conform to class rules (for nothing is so circumscribed by exact measurements as classes of racing yachts) but also would be fast and beautiful.

— Carl Nolte, Sea Letter

He was a legend on the Sausalito waterfront. ...[He was] not a traditionalist, but he was a conservative in his engineering. He was a careful and exacting man who wanted to understand everything before he did it. He wouldn't design something until he completely understood how it would handle the forces on it.

— Michael Wiener, Sea Letter

Myron was a tremendous influence on every sailor active on San Francisco Bay in the first 60 or 70 years of the century—whether they knew it or not. Besides being an excellent sailor, he was one of the premiere designers in the country, though it went largely unrecognized. ...The thing that Myron did for all people under his influence was to show them a way and an ethic of addressing problems that was results-oriented and had very little to do with economics. Concepts and results were his standards of excellence. Never the dollar.

— Commodore Tompkins, Latitude 38

He was one of two or three people I've known over the years who could get the most out of any boat they raced. But he was the only one who also designed and built boats, which made him a complete yachtsman.

— Bob Keefe, Latitude 38

Myron was one of the best sailors on the Bay, ever. He knew the water, he knew design, and he knew how to make boats go fast. He was one of the first pros long before there were pros.

— Hank Easom, Latitude 38

He was the dean of San Francisco yachtsmen and designers. On the Bay, he was the best sailor of the 20th century.

— Charlie Merrill, Latitude 38

Myron Spaulding was a legend on San Francisco Bay and the West Coast; his keen intelligence, precise memory, immense fund of knowledge and experience, and longevity all combined to establish him as the dean of West Coast naval architects. He was known to sailors around the world.
...

Spaulding's boat were characterized by a soundness and rationality of design and the best of materials, equipment, and workmanship, whether built by him or other builders.
...

Highly regarded and respected by the current crop of boat designers, Myron Spaulding was a mentor to several of them over the years and a counselor to local and visiting sailors from around the world. He dispensed wisdom, advice, and expertise on a wide range of subjects to all who came.

— Thomas G. Skahill, Myron Spaulding

Myron was, "a complicated man; a seat-of-the-pants scientist; a synthesizer of ideas, possessed of an exhaustive memory and a remarkable charm, which he chose to use occasionally."

— Commodore Tompkins, Sail West

Myron? Well, he was Myron. Frisco Bay to the core. Aced the woodshop class at Polytechnic High ("By the time I had finished my bookends, that guy had built a boat." Prescott Sullivan). Damn fine first-fiddle with the symphony until he quit that for a 95-year-lucid life of designing, building, measuring, fixing, and sailing sailing boats. Did he own one pair of wrinkled khakis or twenty pair identical? Kind of like a character in Faulkner: so individual that he carried all of the life of the galaxy inside him.

— Kimball Livingston, Sail West

Myron Spaulding was a big influence in my life. I met him when I was 14 or 15. He knew I liked sailing. I was crewing on a boat named Buoyant Girl, one of his designs. He's one of those people that I'd sail with, and then I sail my own boat and think I've got to get back with Myron because he knows what he's doing. He's just raw intellect and power. As a sailing person, as a user of materials, he was a genius. He was Excalibur; he learned from Sparkman and Stephens. [He was] the first one on San Francisco Bay to combine a thorough knowledge of design, along with the difficulties of sailing in San Francisco Bay. So it was a powerful combination. And he won all the races. There's a wonderful photograph that used to be on Myron's wall that showed a start off the St. Francis [Yacht Club] and four or five of Myron's designs and one Sparkman & Stephens design racing. He was a lion in his own small town, but he never got national recognition except [from] a very small group of people.

— Commodore Tompkins, The Log

== Photos ==
The Spaulding designed and built Chrysopyle on the Spaulding Boatworks dock

A Spaulding 33 on the derrick at the Spaulding Boatworks

Suomi, 50 foot yawl designed by Myron Spaulding

Myron Spaulding on San Francisco Bay

The Spaulding Wooden Boat Center in Sausalito (2007)

Myron Spaulding taking a sight aboard Dorade en route from San Francisco to Honolulu in Transpacific race (1936)

Myron Spaulding (circled) in first violin section of San Francisco Symphony (1937)

Myron Spaulding playing violin aboard Odyssey

== See also ==
- Spaulding Wooden Boat Center
- List of sailboat designers and manufacturers
- Yacht racing
- Sausalito, California
