= Willow Creek Academy =

Location
- 636 Nevada St. Sausalito, CA 94965
- 37.8640937°N 122.5021955°W

Information
- Type: Charter school
- Established: 2001
- Closed: 2021
- School district: Sausalito Marin City School District
- Head of school: Emily Cox
- Grades: K - 8
- Enrollment: 409 (2018-19)
- Information: 415-331-7530, Ext. 202
- Website: willowcreekacademy.org

Willow Creek Academy (WCA) was a K-8 public charter school located in Sausalito, California. It is part of the Sausalito Marin City School District and is located on the former campus of Bayside Elementary School next to its namesake, Willow Creek.

The school, which has students from Sausalito and even more students from nearby Marin City, was established to keep Sausalito families in the public school system. A 2008 grand jury report from Marin County stated that most graduates of WCA "succeed" in high school and that the WCA test scores are "good"; it added that there is no "notable problem" with student behavior.

In 2011 the University of Southern California's Rossier School of Education named Willow Creek Academy one of the top charter schools in California.

It consolidated into the Martin Luther King Academy in Marin City in 2021.

== History ==
Willow Creek Academy (WCA) received its charter in 2001 and opened its doors in September 2001 as a K-4 school with 37 students, just 19% of all district kids. By 2004-2005, they had 106 students in a K-8 school. In 2014 the school had 289 students. Their enrollment for the 2015-16 school year has grown to 380 students, or 80% of the district kids. The district has also grown from under 200 students to over 500 students, and WCA was responsible for functional all of the growth. Of the total enrollment, about two fifths of the students live in Marin City, two fifths live in Sausalito, and one fifth live out of district. Of the 84 out-of-district kids, the vast majority are from “revenue limit” districts.

SMCSD officials stated that year that some area wealthy families decided to go back to public school due to the existence of Willow Creek.

The district grew rapidly exclusive of those wealthy families. When WCA opened in 2001, there were less than 200 students in the school district and only 19% went to WCA. Today, there are over 500 students and 80% of them go to WCA. The growth is largely due to what WCA has achieved since it opened.

In 2019 the State of California's courts ordered the Sausalito district to desegregate. The office of the Attorney General of California had accused the Sausalito Marin City district of racially discriminating by keeping the two different schools open.

Between spring 2019 and February 2020 the student population declined by 45, with 10 of those from January 2020 to February 2020. Johanna VanderMolen, the vice president of the board of Willow Creek Academy, stated that questions about whether the district would continue to support Willow Creek Academy were factors in 8 of the 10 who left in early 2020.

In 2019 Willow Creek sued the Sausalito district, arguing that the latter was not properly funding the charter school, as California law required the school district to pay charter schools at a rate equivalent to that of school district campuses. In April 2020 the two parties came to an agreement to where the district would continue paying the charter school before it merges. In 2020 the estimated price of what would be needed to fix the Willow Creek facilities to the point where they are best maintained was $40 million.

In 2021 Willow Creek consolidated into the Martin Luther King School in Marin City.

== Operations ==
The school was a public school, open to any student living in the school district. The school district itself owned the property that Willow Creek resided on.

Parents were encouraged to participate in their children's education and the school community by driving on field trips, volunteering in the classroom, campus clean-up days and creek restoration projects.

== Facilities ==
The school had its offices in a 4,000-square-foot (370 m^{2}) former shipyard office facility that was built in the 1940s. In September 2015 a two-alarm fire occurred, causing severe damage to the building.

== Academics ==
Willow Creek Academy had a cumulative score of 795 on the 2013 CST test, significantly less than the 2012 score of 857, which was less than the peak score reached in 2011. WCA had steadily improved over the seven years from 2004 through 2011, with scores as follows: 674, 709, 738, 829, 826, 856, 882, and 889. Willow Creek attributed the 2012 reduction to rapid growth and has stated that the school's goal is to surpass a cumulative score of 900.

== Budget ==
Willow Creek Academy's budget for the 2019-2020 school year is approximately $3.8M. The school's per-student spending has been declining for the past several years, and the funding are filled by grants and other private fundraising, including the Willow Creek Foundation (WCF). WCF is a not-for-profit foundation that was set up to support WCA and educational choice for Sausalito and Marin City families. In 2018-2019, WCF raised $335,000.

In mid-2019, the Sausalito Marin City School District (SMCSD) drastically cut WCA's budget, by around 30%. This now leaves WCA with only $8000 in per-student funding in a district that generates around $20,000 per student. The traditional public school in the district, Bayside Martin Luther King Academy (BMLK), will receive around $45,000 per student in the 2019-2020 school year.

== Student demographics ==
As of 2016 Willow Creek enrolls about 400 students, 75% of the public school students within the Sausalito Marin City School District; 40% of Willow Creek's students were non-Hispanic white while 60% of the students were racial and ethnic minorities and/or mixed-race. About 150 students resided in Marin City; this number was higher than the enrollment of Bayside-Martin Luther King Academy, the K-8 school in Marin City, which had 143 students.

As of spring 2013, the student body was 37% Hispanic, 25% White, 18% African-American, 11% Asian, 1% Native Hawaiian or Pacific Islander, and 8% who self-identify as multi-ethnic. About 65% of the students qualified for free or reduced-price lunch, and 21% of the students are English learners. Willow Creek is a Title I School without a school-wide program. The majority of the parents of WCA's students in 2013 have attended college: 39% are college graduates (of which 20% went to graduate school); an additional 53% have graduated from high school (of which 37% attended some college); 8% are not high school graduates.

Ethnicity History
Year	Total	African	Native	Asian	Filipino	Latino	Pacific	White	2+	?
2018-19	409	11.50%	0.00%	9.50%	1.00%	25.70%	0.00%	41.80%	10.50%	0.00%
2017-18	411	10.00%	0.00%	9.20%	1.20%	27.30%	0.00%	41.60%	10.70%	0.00%
2016-17	396	9.30%	0.50%	9.10%	1.00%	26.80%	0.00%	42.40%	10.90%	0.00%
2015-16	377	11.70%	0.50%	10.10%	0.30%	26.80%	0.00%	40.60%	10.10%	0.00%
2014-15	357	10.10%	0.00%	10.60%	0.30%	29.70%	0.00%	39.20%	10.10%	0.00%
2013-14	322	12.73%	0.00%	9.94%	0.31%	30.75%	0.00%	36.65%	9.63%	0.00%
2012-13	289	18.69%	0.00%	9.34%	0.35%	29.76%	0.69%	33.22%	7.96%	0.00%
2011-12	247	15.79%	0.40%	8.50%	0.00%	35.22%	0.00%	35.63%	4.45%	0.00%
2010-11	216	18.06%	0.46%	8.33%	0.00%	37.50%	0.00%	30.56%	5.09%	0.00%
2009-10	188	18.62%	0.00%	11.17%	0.00%	35.64%	0.00%	29.79%	3.19%	1.60%
2008-09	147	22.45%	0.00%	12.93%	0.00%	27.89%	0.00%	23.81%	12.93%	0.00%
2007-08	140	30.00%	0.00%	10.00%	0.00%	23.57%	0.00%	25.71%	10.71%	0.00%
2006-07	144	40.28%	0.00%	6.94%	0.00%	18.75%	0.00%	24.31%	9.72%	0.00%
2005-06	136	29.41%	0.00%	6.62%	0.00%	26.47%	0.00%	27.21%	10.29%	0.00%
2004-05	106	33.02%	0.00%	8.49%	0.00%	20.75%	0.00%	24.53%	13.21%	0.00%
2003-04	103	28.16%	0.00%	5.83%	0.00%	15.53%	0.00%	23.30%	27.18%	0.00%
2002-03	69	43.48%	0.00%	4.35%	0.00%	23.19%	0.00%	28.99%	0.00%	0.00%
2001-02	43	39.53%	0.00%	4.65%	0.00%	18.60%	0.00%	16.28%	20.93%	0.00%

Graph of data from the Demographics History table above. Ethnicity with less than 2% omitted for clarity.

== Awards ==
- 2011-12 - Title I Academic Achievement Awards
- 2010 - California Distinguished School Award
- 2006 - Named the sixth best charter school in the state of California, according to the USC School Performance Dashboard (formerly CSI-USC), by the Center on Educational Governance at the USC Rossier School of Education.
