= Spaulding Wooden Boat Center =

Coordinates: 37°52′05.49″N 122°29′49.38″W

The Spaulding Marine Center in Sausalito (2007)

The working boatyard at Spaulding Marine Center

Spaulding boatyard at night

The Spaulding Marine Center, (formally the Spaulding Wooden Boat Center), in Sausalito, California, is a living museum where one can go back in time to experience the days when craftsmen and sailors used traditional skills to build, sail or row classic wooden boats on San Francisco Bay.

The center offers tours, classes and special events, as well as sails on the center's fleet of wooden boats. The center is staffed by master craftsmen, history experts, longtime sailors and volunteers committed to preserving and sharing the center's maritime heritage.

The Spaulding Marine Center is a 501(c)(3) non-profit and tax-exempt California public benefit corporation.

== Mission ==
The mission of the Spaulding Marine Center is to restore and return to active use significant, historic wooden sailing vessels; preserve and enhance our working boatyard; create a place where people can gather to use, enjoy, and learn about wooden boats; and educate others about wooden boat building skills, traditions and values.

== History ==
The Spaulding Marine Center was originally built as the Spaulding Boatworks on the Sausalito waterfront in 1951 by Myron Spaulding, concert violinist, renowned sailor, and yacht designer and builder.

In 2002 Myron Spaulding's widow Gladys left the Spaulding Boatworks in charitable trust, with instructions for the trustees to form a non-profit, charitable organization and living museum.

The Spaulding Boatworks is the oldest marina and boatyard on the historic Sausalito waterfront and one of the last remaining wooden boatyards in the San Francisco Bay Area. It has remained largely unchanged and in continuous use since its inception.

== Programs ==
The interior work area of the Spaulding Marine Center

The Spaulding Marine Center offers a range of programs for both the general public and the serious student interested in traditional wooden boat crafts, seagoing skills and educational and fun maritime experiences.

=== Education ===
The Spaulding Marine Center's education programs are designed to inform the general public about the historic context, legacy and craft of wooden boat building and use on San Francisco Bay. Since 2007, the Spaulding Marine Center also is home to the Arques School of Traditional Boatbuilding, which offers apprenticeship programs in wooden boat building and traditional maritime skills.

==== Public education ====
The Spaulding Marine Center is located on the Sausalito waterfront, and in the future will offer a range of public programs that allow public access to the historic boatyard and the waterfront, including classes, workshops, events and forums on subjects ranging from traditional boatbuilding skills to the preservation of the Sausalito waterfront.

==== Youth education ====
The Spaulding Center supports programs in woodworking, boatbuilding, boat restoration, and sailing for youths interested in learning about and enjoying the maritime environment in Sausalito. In the summer of 2007, the Center offered a woodworking program for Marin City young people. In 2008, the Center worked in partnership with local organizations to introduce students aged 12 to 18 to wooden boatbuilding and sailing. Students were taught traditional woodworking skills, then used those skills to build a 12-foot (3.7 m) Norwegian Sailing Pram. Finally, the students learned to sail on San Francisco Bay in the boat they built. Students blogged about their experiences building the boat and learning to sail at Boatbuilders' and Sailors' Blog.

==== The Arques School of Traditional Boatbuilding ====
Arques students working on a Black Cat 15 foot lapstrake daysailor designed by the school

The Arques School of Traditional Boatbuilding opened in June 1996 within the Arques Trust property in the Marinship District of Sausalito. It was founded by Bob Darr, who is currently the Program Director and Head Instructor. With a core apprenticeship program of just six students, it is a small school dedicated to developing craftsmen skilled in the art of building boats in the traditional plank on frame methods. The school owes its existence to an endowment provided by Donlon Arques who laid the groundwork for the school prior to his death in 1993.

The Arques School education programs at Spaulding Marine Center serve two primary goals: 1) train a new generation of shipwrights who are skilled in traditional methods and crafts, and are enthusiastic ambassadors for the values of hand-crafted wooden boats, and 2) introduce the general public to the experience of traditional sailing by maintaining a fleet of classic wooden boats that can be used in on-the-water public programs.

=== Classic boat restoration ===
The Spaulding Marine Center will continue to restore and preserve important San Francisco Bay wooden boats and communicate the skills and ideals that went into their design, building, and use. The 32-foot (9.8 m) gaff-rigged sloop Freda, the oldest active sailing yacht on the west coast, is the inaugural Spaulding Center restoration project.

==== Freda ====
Freda being restored at Spaulding Marine Center (2007)

Freda under sail in 1880s

Freda was built in 1885 in Belvedere, California by saloon keeper Harry Cookson. Freda has been celebrated for her simple elegance, and called both the Common Man's Yacht and the Matriarch of San Francisco Bay. She was owned by one of the early commodores of the Corinthian Yacht Club in Tiburon, California. Painstakingly restored in the 1950s by Harold Sommer, captain of the last wooden tugboat on San Francisco Bay, Freda became a fixture in the local Master Mariner fleet regattas, but has since suffered from years of deterioration.

Originally built with rock elm frames, Douglas fir decks, black elm and fir hanging knees, fir planks, and lignum vitae deadeyes, Freda embodies the creativity and self-reliance of San Francisco Bay wooden boat builders.

Freda, Matriarch of the Bay, is a Web site devoted to the history and restoration of Freda.

==== Foundry patterns ====
In May 2007, Lin and Larry Pardey loaned the foundry casting patterns for their Lyle Hess-designed 30 foot cutter Taleisin to the safe keeping and management of the SWBC. The patterns will be used for education programs at the center by the Arques School and loaned to others who wish to have parts cast.

=== Boat collection ===
The Spaulding Marine Center will maintain a fleet of restored or newly built wooden sailboats and rowboats that will be available to students at the center and to the public. The 34-foot gaff rigged sailboat, Polaris, a carvel-built (fir planks butted edge to edge on oak ribs) pumpkinseed sloop, which was built on San Francisco Bay in 1906, is currently available for skippered sails at the center. Once Freda is restored, it also will be available for sails on San Francisco Bay, as will select boats built by the Arques School of Traditional Boatbuilding.

== Web site ==
Spaulding Wooden Boat Center

== See also ==
- Myron Spaulding
- Sailboat design and manufacturing
- Boat building
- Sausalito
- Marinship
- Center for Wooden Boats, in Seattle, Washington
