= Radio Sausalito =

- Sausalito, California; United States
- Frequency: AM 1610 kHz

Programming
- Format: Community radio, jazz, Visitor Info

Ownership
- Owner: Jonathan Westerling

History
- First air date: March 2000

Technical information
- Power: 6 x 100 mW (simulcast on 6 100-milliwatt synchronous transmitters)

Links
- Webcast: Listen Live

Radio Sausalito is a "Part 15" AM radio station broadcasting a Big Band Jazz format on 1610 in Southern Marin & 1570 kHz in Alameda. The station is noncommercial and serves the Southern Marin County, California area. The station has partnerships with the local paper, the local library, and local businesses which host its programs. Its programming is also made available online via podcasts. The station has an agreement with the city of Sausalito to provide information to residents in the event of an emergency. In 2009 the station was selected as the audio accompaniment to the community calendar on Marin TV cable channels 26, 27, and 30. For several years Radio Sausalito was broadcasting on 1710 AM in Central San Rafael so as to broadcast the first and last games of the San Rafael Pacifics baseball team. In 2015 the station began broadcasting online and boasts a worldwide audience of over 10,000 per month.

== History ==
The station began in 2000 as an FM station on 100.1 MHz. Following Comcast complaining of co-channel interference with their cable service frequencies, Radio Sausalito changed its transmitting frequency to 1610 kHz on the AM band in 2005. As of June 2009, their programming is heard along with the community bulletin board throughout Marin via MarinTV on cable channels 26 and 27. According to a December 2012 story on KGO-TV, the station has its studios in the basement of a Victorian building in Sausalito. In June 2015, The Joys Of Jazz, produced by Radio Sausalito, was awarded the Bronze trophy for "Best Regularly Scheduled Music Program".

== Personalities ==
- Dizzy Jones: Host of The Last Dance
- Mitchell Field: Host of the Field Trip
- Jonathan Westerling: Founder of the station
- Allan Berland: Host of Jazz Lounge
- Tim Sika: Host of Celluloid Dreams

== Legality ==
Though unlicensed, the station broadcasts legally according to the Federal Communications Commission (FCC). Title 47 CFR Part 15 allows Radio Sausalito to legally broadcast so long as it meets a specific power limitation and prohibit it from interfering with licensed radio stations. Its top of the hour ID includes FCC certification ID of NWXAM1000.
