= Schoonmaker Point =

Landform in California

Coordinates: 37.864167°N 122.487778°W

Schoonmaker Point is a low-lying landform jutting into San Francisco Bay at Sausalito, California. This area was created by dredge spoils from Richardson Bay during local Marin Shipyards shipbuilding activity during World War II. Schoonmaker Point is situated approximately 1.7 miles (2.7 km) south of the Sausalito/Marin City interchange of U.S. Highway 101 immediately north of Bridgeway Boulevard. The Schoonmaker Point Marina is located here, along with a 2.3-acre (9,300 m^{2}) sand beach.. From Schoonmaker Point there are views of Mount Tamalpais and the San Francisco downtown skyline.

Schoonmaker Point is a readily usable put-in point for kayaks accessing San Francisco Bay. Nearby is situated the U.S. Army Corps of Engineers Bay Model, a scale model of the San Francisco Bay, capable of simulating the bay hydrology.

A review of historic aerial photography applicable to Schoonmaker Point was conducted by Earth Metrics, evaluating three stereo photograph pairs; the photographs were flown in 1952, 1965, and 1974 by the U.S. Government and are archived by the U.S. Geological Survey. Analysis of the aerial photos showed that, in 1952, the size of Schoonmaker Point was smaller and the site vicinity on Schoonmaker Point was less developed. Schoonmaker Point Marina had not been constructed at this time, and the Bounty Building did not exist at this time. A small parcel to the immediate west of the Schoonmaker Point parking lot had three small structures on it. The buildings presently occupied by Interbay Lumber Hardware to the west of the subject site existed at this time. Clipper Yacht Harbor to the north of Schoonmaker Point had only two piers at this time.

In 1965 the Schoonmaker Point peninsula had been extended to the north and east to its present size and Schoonmaker Point Marina has begun operations in this expanded area. Clipper Yacht Harbor has been expanded by several piers.

All surface runoff and groundwater from Schoonmaker Point drain toward the northeast to San Francisco Bay.
