= Marin City, California =

Unincorporated community in California, United States

Marin City
- Census-designated place
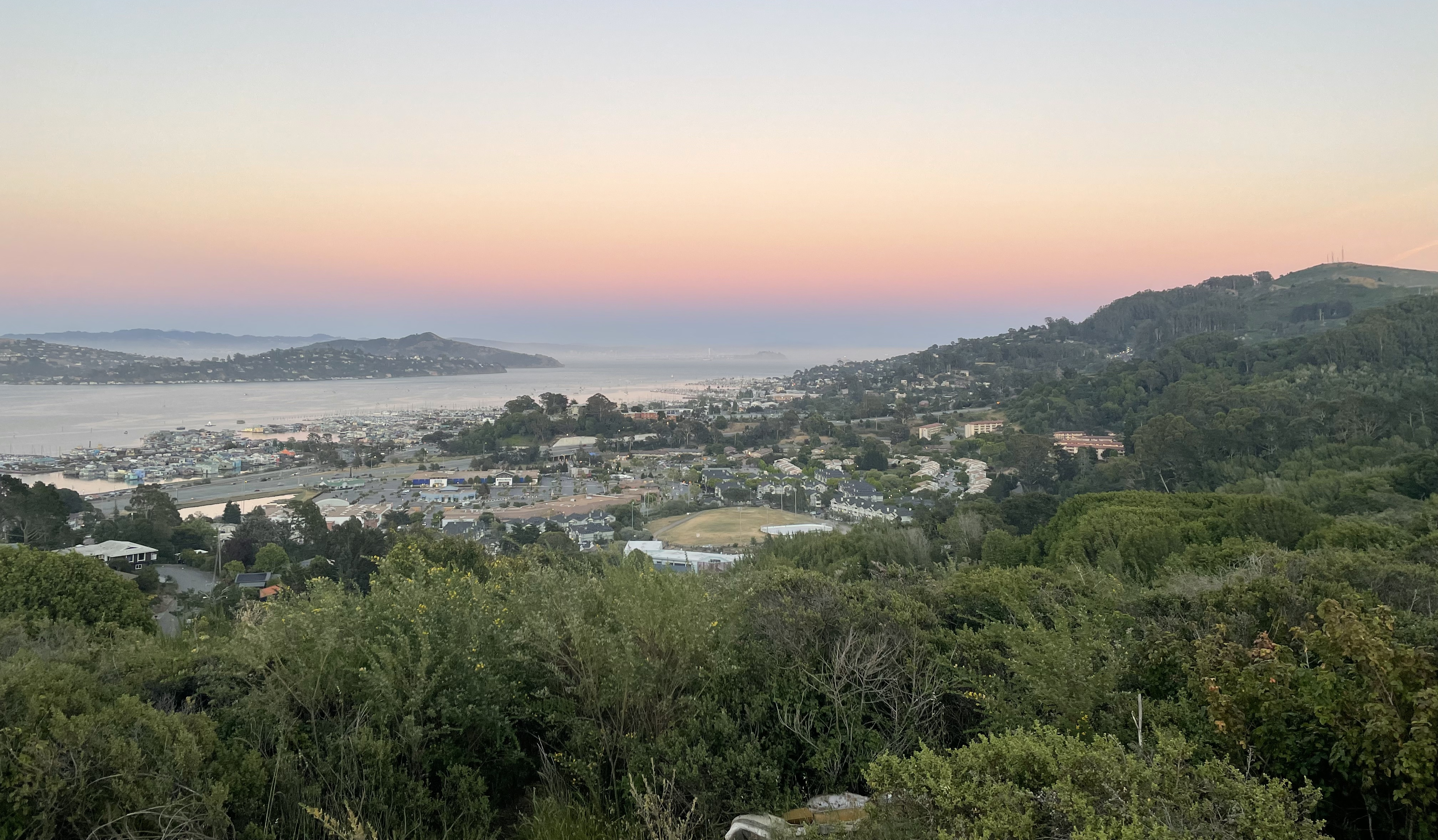
- Marin City viewed from the Alta Trail (Golden Gate National Recreation Area)

- Location within California Location within the United States
- Coordinates: 37.8734°N 122.5119°W
- Country: United States
- State: California
- County: Marin

Government
  - County Board: Stephanie Moulton-Peters (District 3)
  - Senate: Mike McGuire (D)
  - Assembly: Damon Connolly (D)
  - U. S. Congress: Jared Huffman (D)

Area
  - Total: 0.537 sq mi (1.39 km^{2})
  - Land: 0.537 sq mi (1.39 km^{2})
  - Water: 0 sq mi (0 km^{2}) 0%
- Elevation: 23 ft (7 m)

Population (2020)
  - Total: 2,993
  - Density: 5,570/sq mi (2,150/km^{2})
- Time zone: UTC−8 (PST)
  - Summer (DST): UTC−7 (PDT)
- ZIP code: 94965 (Sausalito)
- Area codes: 415/628
- FIPS Code: 06-45820

Marin City is an unincorporated community and census-designated place (CDP) in Marin County, California, United States. As of the 2020 census, it had a population of 2,993, up from 2,666 in 2010. It is located 1.5 miles (2.4 kilometers) northwest of downtown Sausalito, 8 miles (13 km) south-southeast of San Rafael, and about 5 miles (8 km) north of San Francisco from the Golden Gate Bridge, at an elevation of 23 feet (7.0 m). Marin City was developed for housing starting in 1942, to accommodate wartime shipyard workers and other migrants to California. Among those were African Americans from the South in the Great Migration, which continued until 1970.

After World War II, the area became predominantly African-American, as White residents were able to move freely to private housing elsewhere in Marin County. Since the 1980s, additional development has changed the makeup of the population while providing more local jobs. While Marin City has not had a Black majority since the 1990s, Marin City's socioeconomic and racial makeup nevertheless contrasts with the largely White and wealthy population in Marin County overall, having a far higher Black population per capita and less than half the median household income.

== Geography ==
Marin City is located in southern Marin County, about 5 miles (8 km) north of San Francisco. It is bordered to the southeast by the city of Sausalito and to the west by Tamalpais Valley, though there is no direct roadway connection to the latter community. The U.S. Route 101 freeway forms the northeastern edge of the community, beyond which is Richardson Bay, an arm of San Francisco Bay. The community is bordered to the southwest by the hills of the Golden Gate National Recreation Area.

According to the United States Census Bureau, the CDP had an area of 0.54 square miles (1.40 km^{2}), all land.

== History ==
Prior to World War II, this area was occupied by a dairy farm and a handful of families. Soon after war was declared on December 8, 1941, Marin City was rapidly built during 1942 in order to house 6,000 of the 20,000 workers who migrated from all over the United States, attracted by the defense jobs at Marinship, the Sausalito waterfront shipyard. A total of 93 liberty ships and tankers were built and launched from Marinship in fewer than three years.

Many of the African-American shipyard laborers who had migrated to the Bay Area from the South during the second phase of the Great Migration continued to live in Marin City after the war, either by choice or because many black families were restricted by local zoning from living in or buying homes in the towns surrounding Marin City. They became the core of the community after many of the other workers moved to other areas at the end of the war. During the war, African Americans comprised about 10 percent of Marin City's population. By the 1970s, African Americans comprised more than 75 percent of the population of Marin City, most of whom were descendants of the Marinship workers.

During the 1980s and 1990s there was considerable residential and commercial development in the community, including several new housing developments, apartment complexes, and condo developments. The commercial area was expanded, particularly with the construction of the Gateway Shopping Center in 1996, which displaced a locally renowned flea market. As of 2010, the community population was 38.9 percent white and 38.1 percent African American; nearly 14 percent were Hispanic of any race. In the early 21st century, Marin City residents and officials have begun to think about incorporating as a city.

== Government ==
The municipal authority for Marin City is the Marin City Community Services District (MCCSD), a multi-purpose California special district that is governed by a publicly elected five-member board of directors. It is administered by a district manager and staff. Chartered in 1958, the MCCSD is responsible for providing services in the areas of parks and recreation, street lighting, recycling and refuse removal.

According to the Marin County Local Agency Formation Commission (LAFCO), the District has a total area of 0.9 square miles (2.3 km^{2}).

== Demographics ==
Historical population
Census	Pop.	Note	%±
2010	2,666		—
2020	2,993		12.3%
U.S. Decennial Census; 1860–1870 1880-1890; 1900 1910 1920; 1930 1940 1950; 1960 1970 1980; 1990 2000 2010; 2020

Marin City first appeared as a census-designated place in the 2010 United States census.

=== Racial and ethnic composition ===
Marin City CDP, California – Racial and ethnic composition Note: the US Census treats Hispanic/Latino as an ethnic category. This table excludes Latinos from the racial categories and assigns them to a separate category. Hispanics/Latinos may be of any race.
Race / Ethnicity (NH = Non-Hispanic)	Pop 2010	Pop 2020	% 2010	% 2020
White alone (NH)	843	1,017	31.62%	33.98%
Black or African American alone (NH)	995	794	37.32%	26.53%
Native American or Alaska Native alone (NH)	7	1	0.26%	0.03%
Asian alone (NH)	285	404	10.69%	13.50%
Native Hawaiian or Pacific Islander alone (NH)	21	13	0.79%	0.43%
Other race alone (NH)	24	27	0.90%	0.90%
Mixed race or Multiracial (NH)	126	215	4.73%	7.18%
Hispanic or Latino (any race)	365	522	13.69%	17.44%
Total	2,666	2,993	100.00%	100.00%

=== 2020 census ===
As of the 2020 census, Marin City had a population of 2,993. The population density was 5,573.6 inhabitants per square mile (2,152.0/km^{2}).

The age distribution was 20.5% under the age of 18, 7.9% aged 18 to 24, 30.7% aged 25 to 44, 26.1% aged 45 to 64, and 14.7% who were 65 years of age or older. The median age was 38.8 years. For every 100 females, there were 85.7 males, and for every 100 females age 18 and over, there were 82.6 males.

The census reported that 99.4% of the population lived in households, 19 people (0.6%) lived in non-institutionalized group quarters, and no one was institutionalized. According to 2020 census demographic and housing characteristics data, 100.0% of residents lived in urban areas and 0.0% lived in rural areas.

There were 1,303 households, out of which 29.2% included children under the age of 18, 30.9% were married-couple households, 8.1% were cohabiting couple households, 43.7% had a female householder with no partner present, and 17.3% had a male householder with no partner present. 33.3% of households were one person, and 13.5% were one person aged 65 or older. The average household size was 2.28. There were 747 families (57.3% of all households).

There were 1,337 housing units at an average density of 2,489.8 units per square mile (961.3 units/km^{2}), of which 1,303 (97.5%) were occupied. Of these, 27.8% were owner-occupied, and 72.2% were occupied by renters. Of all housing units, 2.5% were vacant; the homeowner vacancy rate was 0.0%, and the rental vacancy rate was 1.3%.

=== Demographic trends ===
Until the 1990s, the majority of Marin City's population was Black. The 2000 census showed the Black population at about 44%, for the first time no longer the majority, but nevertheless the largest single group. This reflected a stable black population of about 1,000 individuals, but with large growth in the overall population of Marin City, largely from White, Latino, and Asian newcomers. The 2010 census showed a similar trend, with a stable Black population being the largest single group at about 37%. The 2020 census showed a decline in the Black population in both absolute numbers and in percentage of the population, now at about 26.5%, making them the second largest group in Marin City after the White population, who make up about 34% of the CDP's population. This reflected a county-wide trend in which the Black population of Marin declined even as the Latino and Asian population of the county grew, with advocates noting that Black residents in particular struggle to stay in Marin. A Marin City community activist noted, however, that the community is 66% people of color.

=== Income and poverty ===
In 2023, the US Census Bureau estimated that the median household income was $73,077, and the per capita income was $56,408. About 11.5% of families and 15.3% of the population were below the poverty line.

=== Comparison with Marin County overall ===
A 2018 Los Angeles Times story on Marin City noted that Marin City's population was about 40% Black compared to 4% in Marin County overall, and that the median annual household income was about $40,000 in Marin City while over $80,000 in Marin County overall. While the results of the 2020 census show a demographic shift in Marin City, the contrast with the overall county remained similar, with about 26.5% of Marin City's population being Black and 2.3% of Marin County overall. Income levels as of 2024 showed similar contrast, with a median annual household income of about $69,000 in Marin City and about $149,000 in Marin County overall.

== Education ==
Marin City is served by the Sausalito Marin City School District for primary grades (K-8) and the Tamalpais Union High School District for secondary grades. The K-8 district operates Martin Luther King Jr. Academy (Formerly Bayside-Martin Luther King Jr. Academy), a K-8 school with preschool and middle school in Marin City and elementary school in Sausalito.

There was formerly Willow Creek Academy, a public charter school in Sausalito which is affiliated with the district. As of 2016 about 150 students in Marin City attended Willow Creek, while Bayside King had a total student enrollment of 143. As of the 2018–2019 school year Willow Creek Academy has 407 students enrolled. Being that Willow Creek is a charter school they welcome anyone who lives in California, although most of the students live within the school district, which is Sausalito and Marin City and other communities in Marin County. Several parents outside of the county also found that Willow Creek was a good fit for their children, most of them being from Fairfield and Vallejo.

In previous eras Grades K-6 were allowed to attended either Bayside Elementary School in Sausalito or Willow Creek Academy (a public charter school), both in Sausalito. Grades 7–8 attended Martin Luther King Jr. Academy in Marin City, or Willow Creek Academy. Residents may attend Willow Creek Academy, a K-8 school in Sausalito. Beginning in the fall of 2013, Bayside was scheduled to close, with Willow Creek taking the former Bayside campus, making MLK a K-8. The consolidation of Bayside into MLK will be in effect in the fall of 2013. In 2014 Bayside moved to Marin City joining MLK, now being known as Bayside MLK Academy. During this time they had no stable principal and not enough teachers for each class. As of now the principal of the school is David Finnane. The new motto of the school is "Panther Pride". Pride standing for, Pride, Respect, Integrity, Determination, Excellence. In 2021 Willow Creek consolidated into the Martin Luther King School in Marin City.

Students in grades 9–12 attend Tamalpais High School in Mill Valley, of the Tamalpais Union High School District.

Marin City is served by the Marin City Library, a branch of the Marin County Free Library that is within the Gateway Shopping Center.

== Housing ==
Homes sold in Marin City are often labeled as being located in Sausalito since Marin City shares the 94965 ZIP Code, the 331 and 332 telephone prefixes, and Sausalito Marin City School District with its close neighbor Sausalito. Most of the housing in Marin City was developed in the 1970s, '80s and '90s after much of the temporary Marinship housing put up in 1942 had been razed.

== Business ==
Once famous for the Marin City Flea Market which was forcibly closed in the mid-1990s, despite community protest, to make way for the Gateway Shopping Center, the MCCSD had planned to launch the smaller-scale Marin City Market Fest on selected Saturdays in the summer of 2006.

== Notable people ==
- Harry Bowden, artist and photographer; lived in Marin City 1949–65.
- George Duke, keyboardist, composer, singer-songwriter; born in San Rafael and raised in Marin City. His 2000 album Cool includes the song "Marin City" about the town.
- Jack Kerouac stayed in Marin City and nearby Mill Valley during his travels in the 1940s and 1950s. (He combined the two cities' names into "Mill City" in On the Road.)
- Anne Lamott, novelist and teacher; long time parishioner at Marin City's St. Andrew's Presbyterian Church, which she credits for her spiritual awakening.
- Hugh Romney, better known as Wavy Gravy, entertainer and peace activist; owned a home in Marin City in the mid-1960s.
- Bola Sete, Brazilian jazz and bossa nova guitarist; lived in Marin City, where he owned a home.
- Tupac Shakur, rapper and actor; moved to Marin City with his family in 1988. He attended nearby Tamalpais High School, before moving to Oakland after graduation to pursue his music career. In 1992, following a performance at the Marin City Festival, an altercation broke out between Shakur's entourage and local youths that resulted in a 6-year-old boy being killed by a stray bullet from a gun registered to Shakur.
- Lew Welch, Beat poet; lived in Marin City during the 1960s.
