= Belvedere =

Belvedere (from Italian, meaning "beautiful sight") may refer to:

== Places ==
=== Australia ===
- Belvedere, Queensland, a locality in the Cassowary Coast Region

=== Africa ===
- Belvedere (Casablanca), a neighborhood in Casablanca, Morocco
- Belvedere, Harare, Zimbabwe, a suburb
- Belvedere Park, Tunis

=== Europe ===
- Belvédère, Alpes-Maritimes, France, a commune
- Cortile del Belvedere, Renaissance courtyard in the Vatican Palace in Rome
- Mount Belvedere, northern Italy; see 10th Mountain Division (United States)
- Belvedere, palace complex in Vienna, Austria
- Belvedere, London, United Kingdom, a suburban area and electoral ward, part of the borough of Bexley
- Belvedere Glacier, in the Italian Alps
- Belvedere, Suvereto, Tuscany, Italy
- Belvedur, Slovenia

=== North America ===
- Belvedere, California, a city
  - Belvedere Lagoon, an artificial lagoon
  - Belvedere Park, California
- Belvedere, a neighborhood, now part of East Los Angeles, California
- Belvedere Island, Marin County, California
- Belvedere, Delaware, an unincorporated community
- Belvedere, Michigan, ghost town
- Belvedere, Ohio, a populated place
- Belvedere, South Carolina, a census-designated place
- Riverfront Plaza/Belvedere, a public area in Louisville, Kentucky
- Belvedere, U.S. Virgin Islands, a settlement
- Belvedere, Alberta, Canada, a locality
- Belvedere, Edmonton, Alberta, Canada, a neighborhood
- Belvedere, Calgary, Alberta, A Neighborhood

=== South America ===
- Belvedere, Montevideo, Uruguay, a neighborhood

== Buildings ==
- Belvedere (structure), in architecture, a structure designed to incorporate a view
- Belvedér, Labská Stráň, oldest viewing point in Bohemian Switzerland in the Czech Republic
- Belvedere, Vienna, Austria, a palace complex
  - Belvedere (Palace Chapel)
- Belvedere auf dem Pfingstberg, a palace in Potsdam, Germany
- Belvedere auf dem Klausberg, a building in Potsdam, Germany
- Schloss Belvedere, Weimar, Germany, a small palace
- Belvedere Castle, a folly in Central Park in Manhattan, New York City
- Belvédère Castle, Laeken, Belgium
- Queen Anne's Summer Palace, Prague, Czech Republic
- Cortile del Belvedere or Belvedere Courtyard, Vatican Palace, Rome
- Belvedere Estate, Calcutta, which houses the National Library of India
- Belvedere Garden, a private housing estate in Tsuen Wan, Hong Kong
- Belvedere House and Gardens, Ireland
- Fort Belvedere (disambiguation)
- Hotel Belvedere (disambiguation):
  - Hotel Belvédère du Rayon Vert, Art Deco building at Cerbère, France
  - Belvedere Hotel, Baltimore, Maryland, United States
- Belvedere (West Virginia), United States, a mansion in the National Register of Historic Places
- Estadio Belvedere, a multi-use stadium in Montevideo, Uruguay
- Belvédère tower, an observation tower near Mulhouse, Alsace, France
- Belvedere Water Tower, Aachen, Germany
- Belvedere Apartments (Columbia, Missouri), a residential complex in Columbia, Missouri, United States
- Villa St Ignatius (originally called Bel-Vedere), St. Julian's, Malta
- Belevedere, an earlier name of Pontikokastro, a castle in southern Greece
- Belvedere Manor, in Seredžius, Lithuania
- Belweder, a former presidential palace in Poland
- Haldon Belvedere, a castle folly in Devon

== Schools ==
- Belvedere College, Dublin, Ireland, a private Jesuit secondary school for boys
- The Belvedere Academy, a girls' school in Liverpool, England

== Football clubs ==
- Belvedere F.C., an Irish association football club
- Burnley Belvedere F.C., an English association football club

== Ships ==
- Belvedere (1787 EIC ship), a ship of the British East India Company
- SS Belvedere, a cargo steamship built in 1913, and renamed SS Audacious (1913) in 1941
- HMS Belvidera (1809), a Royal Navy sailing frigate

== Other transport ==
- Bristol Belvedere, a military helicopter designed by the Bristol Aeroplane Company
- Plymouth Belvedere, an US automobile made by Plymouth from 1951 through 1970
- Belvedere railway station, London, United Kingdom
- Belvedere LRT Station, in Edmonton, Alberta, Canada

== Arts and entertainment ==
- Belvedere (M. C. Escher), a 1958 lithograph by M. C. Escher
- The Belvedere, a 1913 work by English painter John William Godward
- Belvedere (band), a Canadian punk rock band founded in the late 1990s
- Belvedere (comic strip), running from 1962 to 1995
- Belvedere (film), a 2010 film
- Lynn Aloysius Belvedere, the main character of the 1947 novel Belvedere by Gwen Davenport, three films, and the television series Mr. Belvedere
- Belvedere, a variation of the Bristol card game
- Österreichische Galerie Belvedere, Vienna, Austria, an art museum housed in Belvedere Castle

== Business ==
- Belvédère (company), an alcohol-related company based in Beaune, France
- Belvedere Records, an American record label
- Belvedere Vodka, a brand of Polish vodka

== People ==
- Andrea Belvedere (1646–?), Italian Baroque painter
- Robert Mascara (born 1972), floor manager on the show Good Morning Australia, nicknamed "Belvedere"
- Vittoria Belvedere (born 1972), Italian actress

== Other uses ==
- Earl of Belvedere, an Irish peerage from 1756 to 1814

== See also ==
- Miss Belvedere, a Plymouth Belvedere automobile sealed in an underground vault as a 50-year time-capsule in 1957
- Erith & Belvedere F.C., an English association football club
- Old Belvedere, an Irish rugby union club
- Belvidere (disambiguation)
- Belveder (disambiguation)
- Belweder, a palace in Warsaw, a former residence of several Polish presidents
