= El Potrero =

El Potrero may refer to:

- El Potrero, Catamarca, a village and rural municipality in Catamarca Province, Argentina
- El Potrero, Salta, a village and rural municipality in Salta Province, Argentina
- El Potrero River, El Salvador
- El Potrero Chico, a rock climbing area in Nuevo León, Mexico
- El Potrero de la Punta del Tiburon, now Belvedere Island, California, United States
- El Potrero, Coclé, Panama
- El Potrero, Veraguas, Panama

== See also ==
- Potrero (disambiguation)
