= Potrero Hills =

Potrero Hills may refer to:

- Potrero Hills (Richmond, California), mountains in Contra Costa County, California
- Potrero Hills (Solano County, California) are mountains in Solano County, California.

== See also ==
- Potrero Hill, a neighborhood of San Francisco, California
- Potrero (disambiguation)
