= Hotel Belvedere =

Hotel Belvedere (or Hotel Belvédère) could refer to:

- Hotel Belvédère du Rayon Vert (France)
- Belvedere Hotel (Maryland, USA)
- Belvedere Club (Michigan, USA)
- The Belvedere Hotel (Dublin) (Ireland)
- Hotel Belvédère, Furka Pass (Switzerland)
- Hotel Belvedere (Dubrovnik, Croatia)

== See also ==
- Belvedere (disambiguation)
