= Belveder =

Belveder may refer to:

- Belvedér, a viewing point in the Czech Republic
- Belveder, Rijeka, a section of Rijeka, Croatia

== See also ==
- Belvedere (disambiguation)
