= Potrero =

Potreros may refer to:

== Landforms ==
- Potrero (landform)
- Pasture

== Places ==
- Potrero, California, a census-designated place in San Diego County, California
- Potrero Chico, a rock climbing area in Mexico
- Potrero Generating Station, an electricity generating station in Potrero Point, San Francisco
- Potrero Grande, a town in Panama
- Potrero Hill, San Francisco, a neighborhood in San Francisco, California, USA
- Potrero Hills (Solano County, California), a mountain range in Solano County, California
- Potrero Point, a land mass extending into San Francisco Bay, San Francisco, California
- Chimayo, New Mexico or Potrero de Chimayo, a census-designated place in New Mexico, USA
- Potrero metro station, in Mexico City
- Potrero (Mexico City Metrobús), a BRT station in Mexico City
- Point Potrero, Richmond, California
- San José del Potrero, a municipality in Honduras

== Vessels ==
- SS Potrero del Llano, a Mexican oil tanker sunk during the Second World War

== See also ==
- El Potrero (disambiguation)
