= Gradin =

Gradin Gràdena
- Location in Slovenia
- Coordinates: 45°27′21.7″N 13°50′53.55″E
- Country: Slovenia
- Traditional region: Littoral
- Statistical region: Coastal–Karst
- Municipality: Koper

Area
  - Total: 1.44 km^{2} (0.56 sq mi)
- Elevation: 476.9 m (1,565 ft)

Gradin (pronounced [ˈɡɾáːdin]; Italian: Gràdena) is a settlement in the City Municipality of Koper in the Littoral region of Slovenia.

The former parish church in the settlement is dedicated to the Feast of the Holy Cross.

== History ==
In 1954, when the Free Territory of Trieste was dissolved and Zone B was assigned to Yugoslavia, Gradin (together with Abitanti, Belvedur, Brezovica pri Gradinu, Koromači–Boškini, Močunigi, Pregara, and Sirči) was originally assigned to the Socialist Republic of Croatia. In 1956 these villages were reassigned to the Socialist Republic of Slovenia.
