= Tackley Farm =

Historic house in West Virginia, United States

- U.S. National Register of Historic Places
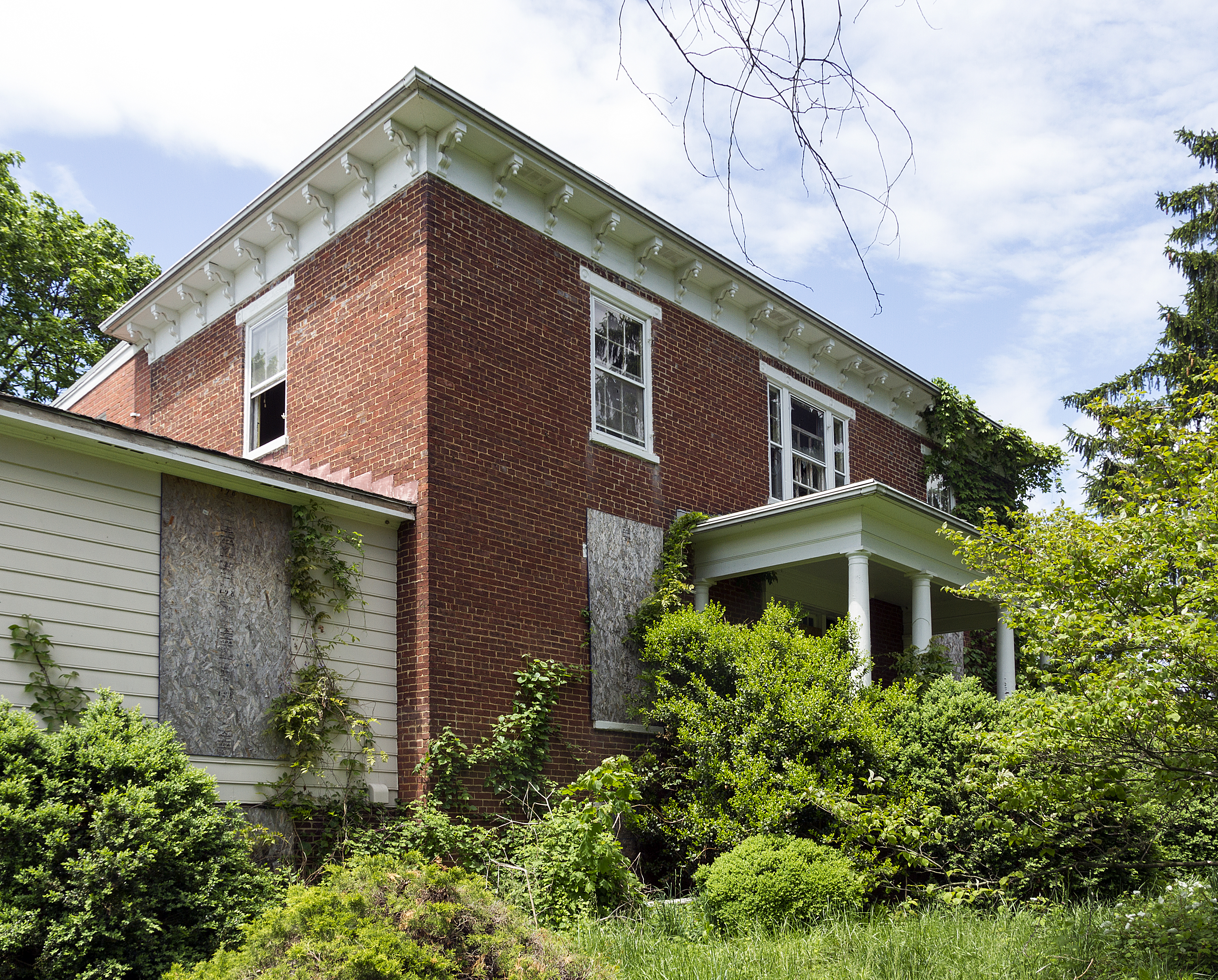
- Tackley Farm in 2013

- Location within West Virginia Location within the United States
- Location: Jefferson County, West Virginia, USA
- Nearest city: Shenandoah Junction, West Virginia
- Coordinates: 39°21′50.23″N 77°52′21.07″W
- Built: 1840
- Architect: Joel Blue
- Architectural style: Greek Revival
- NRHP reference No.: 94001286
- Added to NRHP: November 4, 1994

Tackley Farm, also known as Valley View, is a Greek Revival farmhouse near Shenandoah Junction, West Virginia. The property was leased by Michael Blue in 1777 from Colonel Richard Blackburn, the original grantee who migrated from England and acquired over 2000 acres in 1754. In 1757, Michael Blue and his brother had served with Blackburn in the foot Army of Col. Armstrong in Delaware. In 1795, Michael Blue purchased his 150 acres from Blackburn's son Thomas. In 1840, Michael Blue's son Joel built the present house.

The house closely resembles Belvedere, near Charles Town.
