= Brezovica pri Gradinu =

Brezovica pri Gradinu Bresovizza (di Gradigne)
- Location in Slovenia
- Coordinates: 45°27′4.76″N 13°51′16.91″E
- Country: Slovenia
- Traditional region: Littoral
- Statistical region: Coastal–Karst
- Municipality: Koper

Area
  - Total: 3.759 km^{2} (1.451 sq mi)

Population (2026)
  - Total: 62
  - Density: 17/km^{2} (44/sq mi)

Brezovica pri Gradinu (pronounced [ˈbɾéːzɔʋitsa pɾi ˈɡɾáːdinu]; Italian: Bresovizza (di Gradigne)) is a small settlement in the City Municipality of Koper in the Littoral region of Slovenia close to the Croatian border. As of January 2026, the population was 62.

== Name ==
The name of the settlement was changed from Brezovica to Brezovica pri Gradinu in 1959.

== History ==
In 1954, when the Free Territory of Trieste was dissolved and Zone B was assigned to Yugoslavia, Brezovica pri Gradinu (together with Abitanti, Belvedur, Gradin, Koromači–Boškini, Močunigi, Pregara, and Sirči) was originally assigned to the Socialist Republic of Croatia. In 1956 these villages were reassigned to the Socialist Republic of Slovenia.
