= Accidentally Wes Anderson =

Online community, website, and book series

- Abbreviation: AWA
- Formation: June 2017
- Founders: Wally Koval, Amanda Koval
- Type: Online community
- Purpose: Photography; travel
- Official language: English
- Awards: Webby Award (2022); Webby People's Voice (2022)
- Website: accidentallywesanderson.com

Accidentally Wes Anderson (AWA) is an online community, website, and book series that curates photographs of real-world locations resembling the visual style of director Wes Anderson. Wally and Amanda Koval started the project in 2017. Anderson has no formal role, but wrote the forewords to both books. He called the first "a very entertaining collection of images and also an especially alluring travel guide." It became a New York Times bestseller. The books and website feature locations from all seven continents.

== History ==
The project grew out of a 2017 Reddit thread called "Accidental Wes Anderson," in which users posted photographs of buildings and landscapes that resembled locations from Anderson's films. Wally Koval launched the Instagram account @AccidentallyWesAnderson that June, with the Hotel Belvedere on the Furka Pass in Switzerland as its first post. By early 2018, the account was receiving thousands of submissions a week.

Wally and Amanda Koval run the account together. Neither has a background in photography or writing. Both lost their jobs during the COVID-19 pandemic and focused on AWA full-time.

The project has worked with Anderson's team on promotional efforts, including Isle of Dogs (2018) and The French Dispatch (2021).

AWA launched a website in 2020 in response to followers' asking for location guides. The site has won two Webby Awards.

== Aesthetic ==
The AWA aesthetic is symmetrical, color-coordinated, and has unusual details. Common subjects include hotels, lighthouses, theaters, steeples, outdated technology, and pink buildings. Each post is intended to suggest an imagined Anderson film, not imitate an existing one; and includes the location's history.

== Reception ==
Most contributing photographers are amateurs shooting on phones. Anderson scholar Matt Zoller Seitz has said the account shows how fans recognize Anderson's visual aesthetic in actual places, particularly as his recent films rely more on built sets than real locations.

== Publications ==
- Koval, Wally; Koval, Amanda (2020). Accidentally Wes Anderson. Foreword by Wes Anderson. New York: Voracious. ISBN 978-0-316-49273-7.
- Koval, Wally (2022). Accidentally Wes Anderson Postcards. New York: Voracious. ISBN 978-0-316-45053-9.
- Koval, Wally (2023). Accidentally Wes Anderson Jigsaw Puzzle. London: Laurence King Publishing. ISBN 978-1-3996-1766-6.
- Koval, Wally; Koval, Amanda (2024). Accidentally Wes Anderson: Adventures. Foreword by Wes Anderson. New York: Voracious. ISBN 978-0-316-56942-2.

== Exhibitions ==
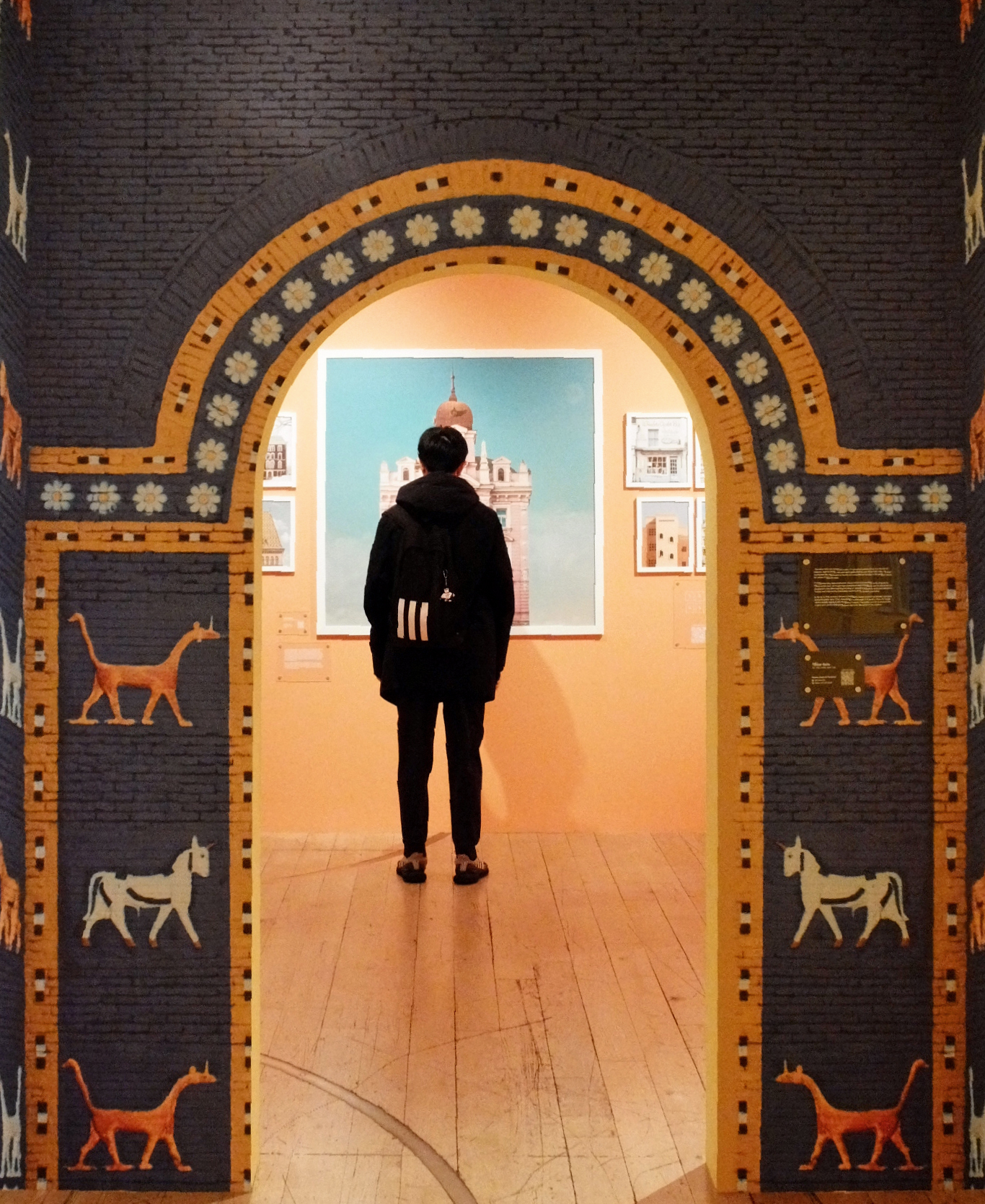
A visitor at the 2024 London exhibition

AWA has organized exhibitions in Asia, Europe, and the United States since 2021.

- 2021: Hidden Wonders, Sotheby's, Geneva, Switzerland, and New York, United States
- 2021–2022: This Is an Adventure, Ground Seesaw, Seoul, South Korea
- 2022: Popping Up in Macao, Youth Culture Promotion Association of Macao, Macao
- 2022: One Hundred Shoreditch pop-up, London, United Kingdom
- 2023: Too Much Landscape, Warehouse TERRADA, Tokyo, Japan
- 2023–2024: The Exhibition, South Kensington, London, United Kingdom
- 2024: Encounters, Shenzhen, China
- 2024–2025: Adventure Never Ends, Ground Seesaw, Seoul, South Korea
- 2025: The Mills and Airside, Hong Kong
