= Abitanti =

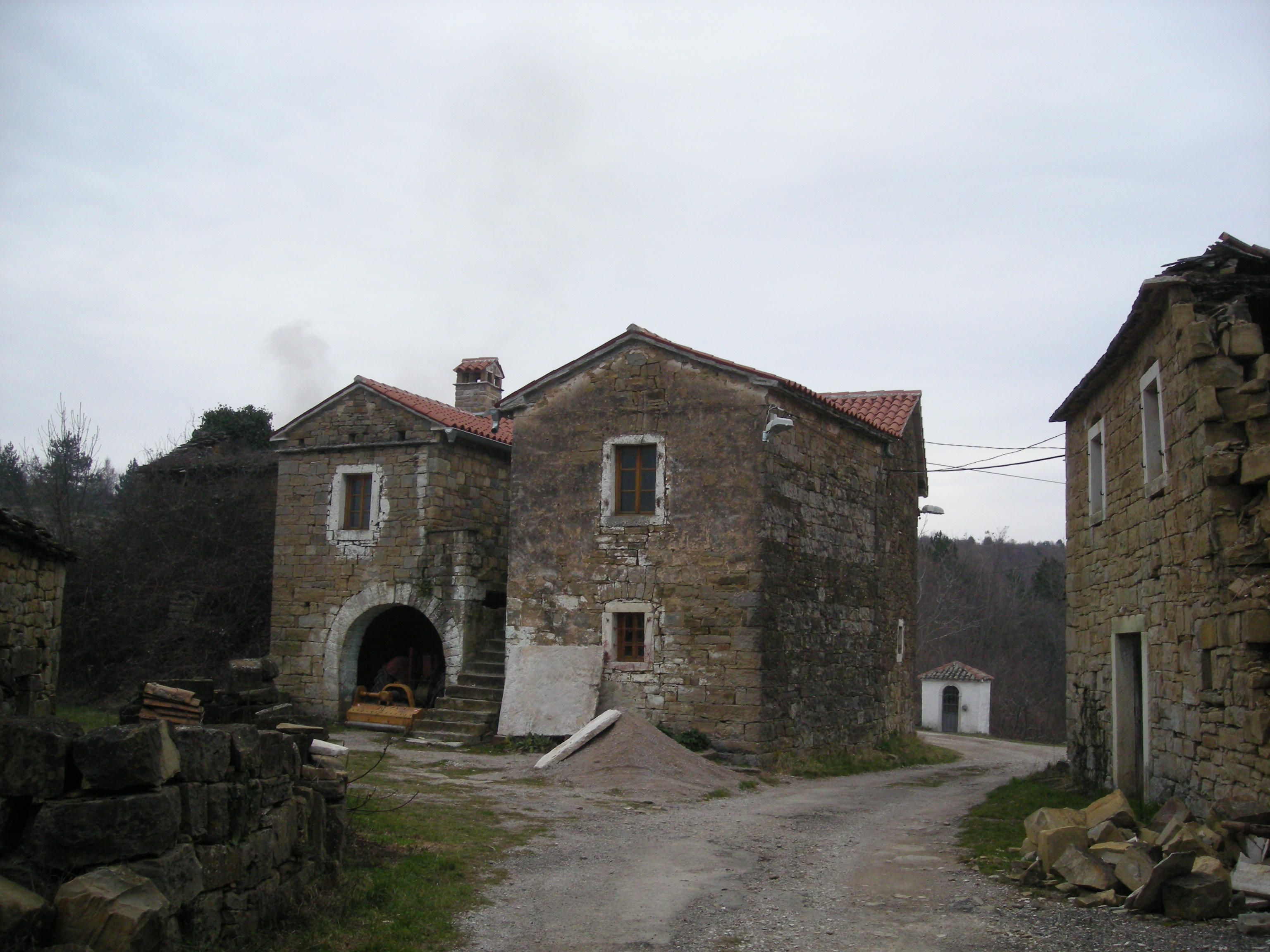

- Location in Slovenia
- Coordinates: 45°26′14.14″N 13°49′32.1″E
- Country: Slovenia
- Traditional region: Littoral
- Statistical region: Coastal–Karst
- Municipality: Koper

Area
  - Total: 4.907 km^{2} (1.895 sq mi)

Population (2026)
  - Total: 26
  - Density: 5/km^{2} (13/sq mi)

Abitanti (pronounced [abiˈtaːnti]) is a small settlement in the City Municipality of Koper in the Littoral region of Slovenia. In January 2026, the population was 26.

== Overview ==
Abitanti is accessible by road from Črni Kal, past Gračišče and Gradin. It is a largely deserted village with only 12 permanent residents left, but becomes busy in May, when it hosts an international fine arts colony. Most of the village buildings are very interesting from the architectural point of view and are a protected cultural heritage site.

== History ==
In 1954, when the Free Territory of Trieste was dissolved and Zone B was assigned to Yugoslavia, Abitanti (together with Belvedur, Brezovica pri Gradinu, Gradin, Koromači–Boškini, Močunigi, Pregara, and Sirči) was originally assigned to the Socialist Republic of Croatia. In 1956 these villages were reassigned to the Socialist Republic of Slovenia.
