= Močunigi =

Močunigi Mocenighi
- Location in Slovenia
- Coordinates: 45°27′4.09″N 13°48′35.83″E
- Country: Slovenia
- Traditional region: Littoral
- Statistical region: Coastal–Karst
- Municipality: Koper

Area
  - Total: 1.20 km^{2} (0.46 sq mi)
- Elevation: 421 m (1,381 ft)

Population (2002)
  - Total: 0

Močunigi (pronounced [mɔtʃuˈniːɡi]; Italian: Mocenighi) is a small settlement in the City Municipality of Koper in the Littoral region of Slovenia.

It lies right on the border with Croatia and is not connected by road to any surrounding settlements in Slovenia, only by a path to small villages on the Croatian side. It no longer has any permanent residents.

== History ==
In 1954, when the Free Territory of Trieste was dissolved and Zone B was assigned to Yugoslavia, Močunigi (together with Abitanti, Belvedur, Brezovica pri Gradinu, Gradin, Koromači–Boškini, Pregara, and Sirči) was originally assigned to the Socialist Republic of Croatia. In 1956 these villages were reassigned to the Socialist Republic of Slovenia.
