= San Francisco Bay National Estuarine Research Reserve =

Nature reserve in America

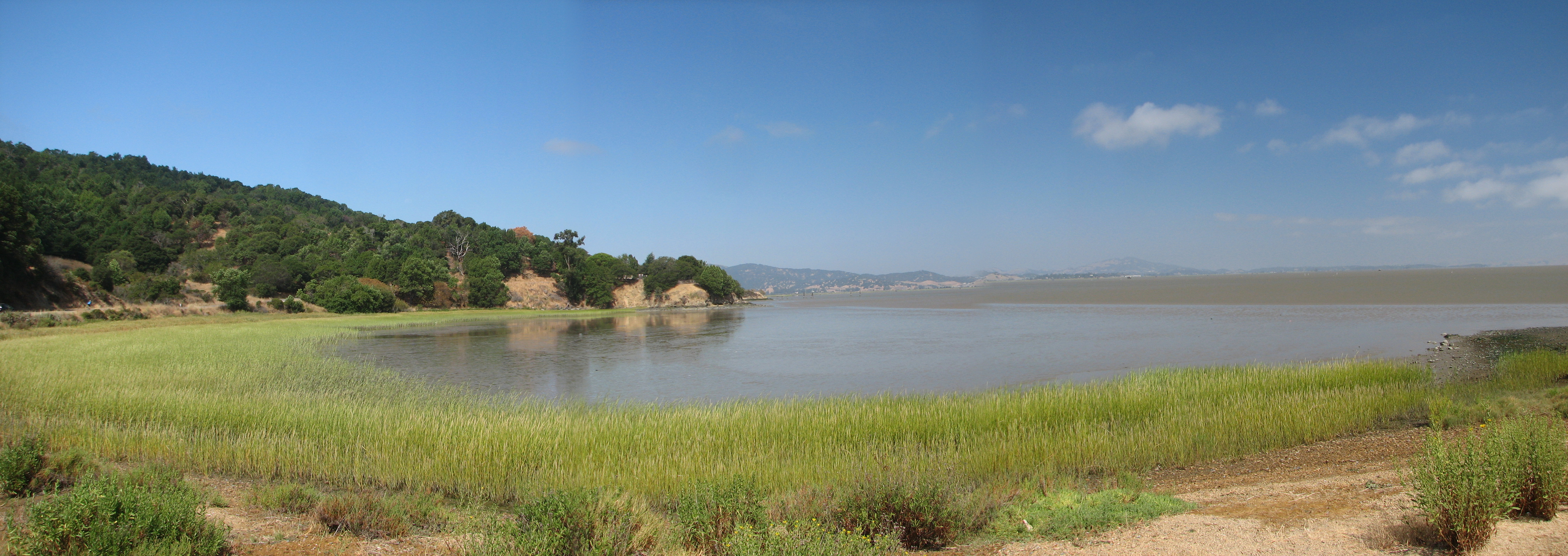
Bay view from China Camp Park, part of the San Francisco Bay National Estuarine Research Reserve

The San Francisco Bay National Estuarine Research Reserve (San Francisco Bay NERR) is one of 30 reserves established as part of the United States National Estuarine Research Reserve System. The reserve is used to promote San Francisco Bay wetlands and estuary research, education, and stewardship.

The reserve’s headquarters is located at San Francisco State University's Romberg Tiburon Campus.

== History ==
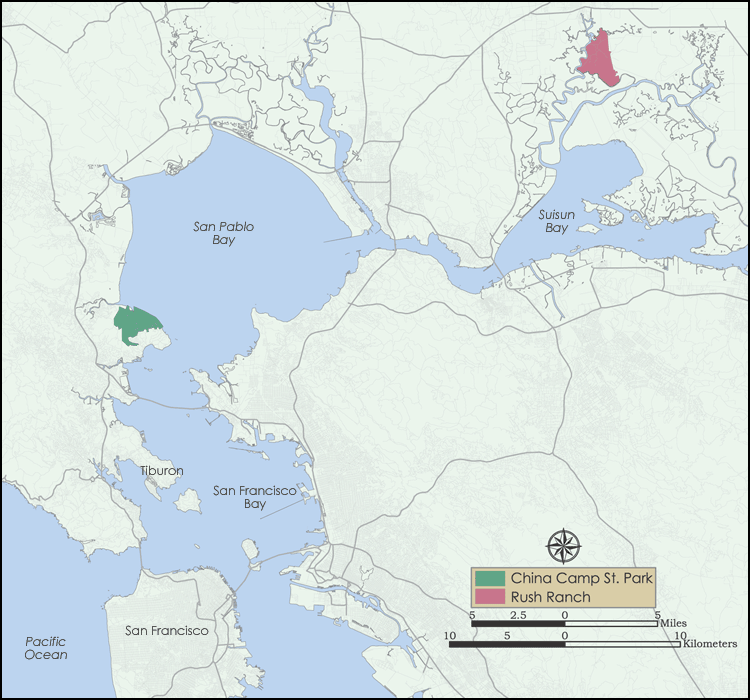
Map of San Francisco Bay National Estuarine Research Reserve sites

In the 1990s, Dr. Roger Crawford from SFSU received a grant from NOAA to explore the potential for establishing a NERR in San Francisco Bay. Dr. Mike Vasey was then appointed to lead the designation process. Dr. Vasey and a team of scientists recommended that the reserve be designed to include some of the last remaining high-quality tidal wetlands in the San Francisco Estuary. The reserve was designated in August 2003.

== Reserve sites ==
The San Francisco Bay NERR consists of two sites in the San Francisco Bay Area which total 3,710 acres:

- Rush Ranch Open Space Preserve — 2,070-acre (8.4 km^{2}), on the northern margin of Suisun Marsh, at the western foot of the Potrero Hills, in Solano County.
- China Camp State Park — 1,640-acre (6.6 km^{2}), on the shore of San Pablo Bay near San Rafael in Marin County.

== Organization ==
The reserve's lead federal agency is the National Oceanic and Atmospheric Administration (NOAA) and the lead state agency is San Francisco State University.

There are numerous other agencies and organizations involved with the reserve, including:

- Solano Land Trust owns and manages the Rush Ranch component of the reserve.
- California Department of Parks and Recreation (California State Parks) owns the China Camp component of the reserve and is the lead agency for ecological and cultural resource management there.
- Friends of China Camp operates the China Camp component.
- Richardson Bay Audubon Center partners with the reserve in research and monitoring in Richardson Bay.
- Smithsonian MarineGEO partners with the reserve at the Richardson Bay Audubon Center and Sanctuary.
- San Francisco Bay Conservation and Development Commission is a NOAA coastal zone managing agency within the San Francisco Estuary that partners with the reserve on coastal resilience and planning.
- U.S. Fish and Wildlife Service was involved in the South Bay during the reserve's planning phase.
- U.S. Army Corps of Engineers has regulatory jurisdiction over the reserve sites.
- California Department of Fish and Wildlife has ultimate responsibility and authority for managing the fish and wildlife resources of California.
- Smithsonian Environmental Research Center co-sponsors a water quality and weather station located within the Richardson Bay Audubon Center and Sanctuary with the reserve.
- San Francisco Estuary Institute provides resources to create cost-effective solutions for complex environmental issues.
- U.S. Geological Survey provides research expertise and equipment to reserve research, monitoring, and land management activities.
- Point Blue Conservation Science partners with the reserve in many projects and provides expertise and data on bird populations at Rush Ranch and China Camp.
- San Pablo Bay National Wildlife Refuge is involved in large-scale tidal wetland restoration and endangered species recovery in the northern San Pablo Bay region.

== See also ==
- Estuarine
- Estuaries of California
- Wetlands of the San Francisco Bay Area
