= San Francisco State University Romberg Tiburon Campus =

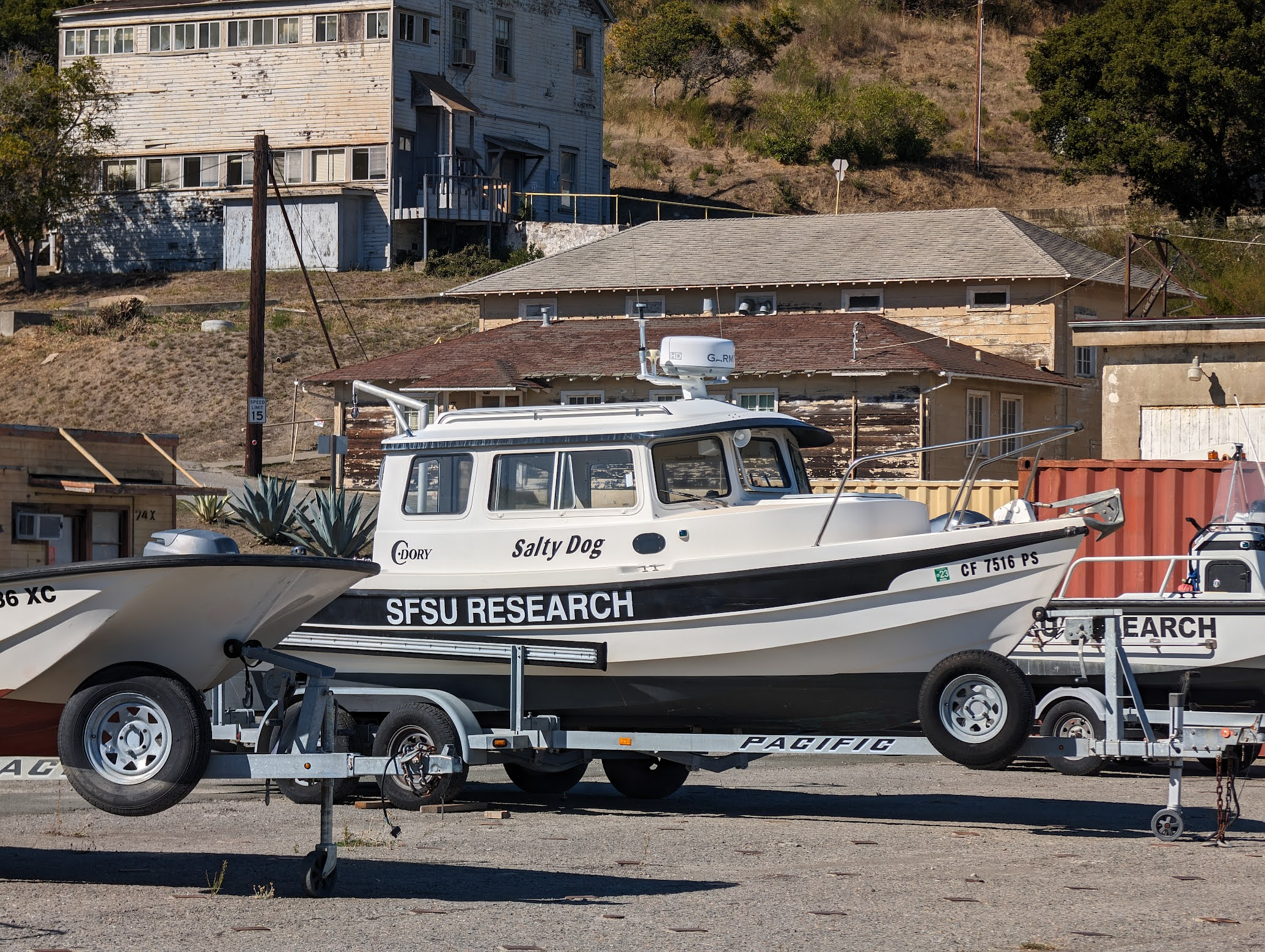
A research vessel at the Romberg Tiburon Campus

The Romberg Tiburon Campus was a satellite campus of San Francisco State University and a 53.7-acre research campus (21.7 ha) located in Tiburon, California. It was home to the only marine and environmental science labs on San Francisco Bay. The university still owns the property.

The campus is named for Paul F. Romberg, who was SF State's president during the acquisition of the land.

SFSU's Estuary & Ocean Science Center operated at the campus. The Tiburon branch of the Smithsonian Environmental Research Center's Marine Invasions Lab and the offices for the San Francisco Bay National Estuarine Research Reserve were also located there.

In 2025, the university announced that this campus would close due to financial struggles, but the closure was paused after a fundraising campaign yielded $3.2 million. It was announced in August 2026 that the campus would close at the end of September.

== History ==
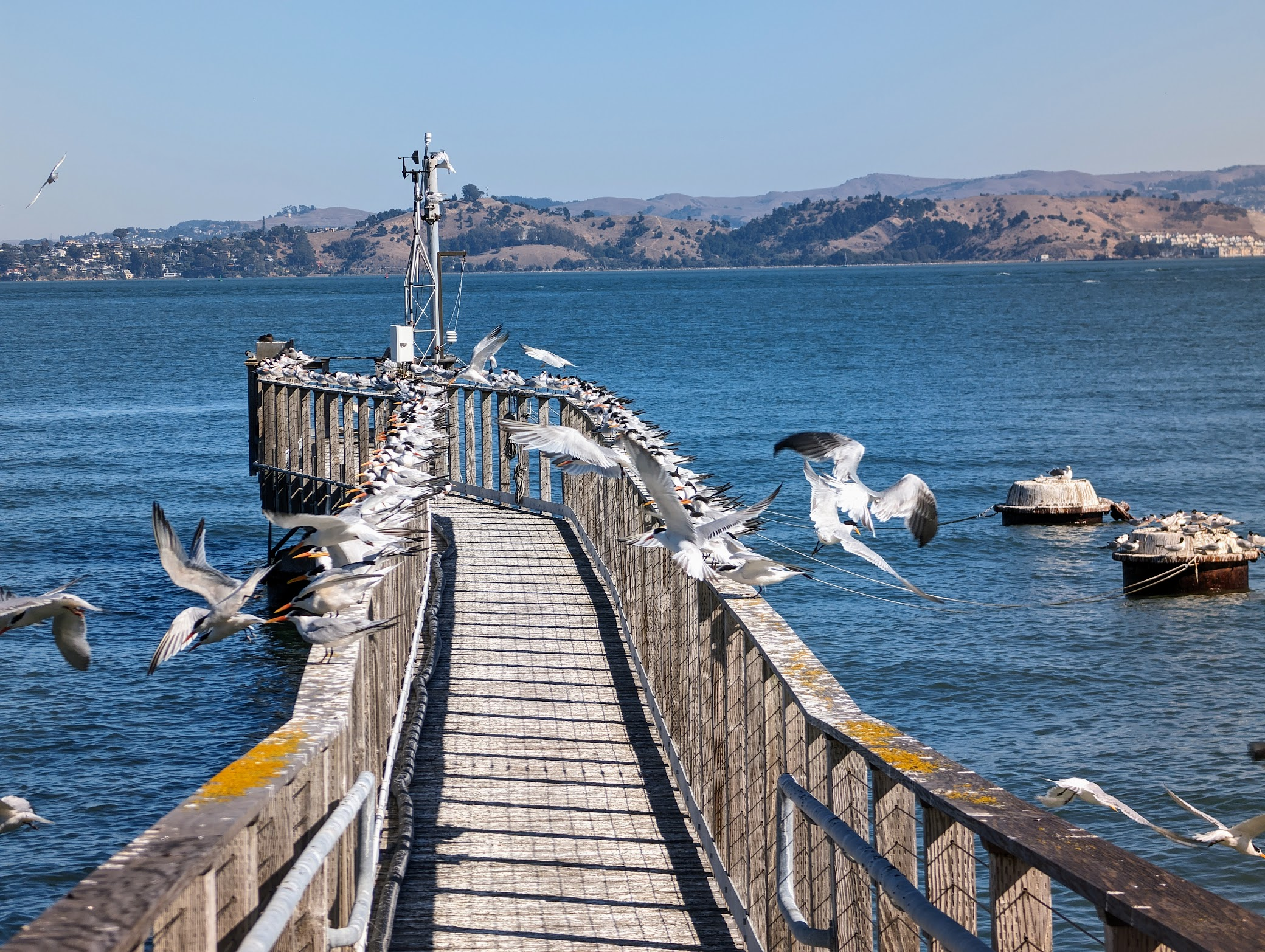
A pier at the Romberg Tiburon Campus

The history of the land stretches back to the early 19th century, when it was home to a Coast Miwok village. After Mission San Raphael's establishment in 1817, the Miwok cultivated gardens and tended livestock for the mission. The area later became part of a Mexican land grant, Rancho Corte de Madera del Presidio, operating as cattle and dairy ranches until the 1870s.

In 1877, Lynde & Hough Co., a cod fishing firm, purchased the cove property and established one of the West Coast's largest cod processing operations. They constructed the first wharf and warehouse, processing cod brought from Alaskan waters for global markets.

In 1904, the site was purchased by the U.S. Navy for $80,000 to build a coaling station.

The Navy's presence marked the beginning of significant infrastructure development. The coaling station operated to 1931, with construction of coal hoisting towers, storage bunkers, and a cable railway system. Ships were supplied with East Coast coal at $7 per ton. When naval vessels converted to oil fuel, the station closed and entered a brief period as California's first nautical training school, later known as the California Maritime Academy.

In 1933, the site was leased by the Navy to John A. Roebling's Sons Co. for manufacturing cables for the Golden Gate Bridge.

World War II brought renewed military significance to the site. From 1940 to 1958, it served as the Navy Net Depot, manufacturing and distributing anti-submarine and torpedo nets along the Pacific Coast. The depot's crowning achievement was the installation of a massive seven-mile, 6,000-ton submarine net across the Golden Gate entrance, completed before the Pearl Harbor attack. Though briefly reactivated during the Korean War, the depot eventually closed in 1958, and portions of the property were converted to public parks.

In 1961, the U.S. Bureau of Sport Fisheries and Wildlife established a marine laboratory on site. This period saw diverse scientific activities, including the Marine Minerals Technology Center's ocean floor research and Naval Electronics Facility operations. A significant transition occurred in 1970 when the facility was consolidated under the newly-formed National Oceanic and Atmospheric Administration (NOAA).

Under NOAA's leadership, the laboratory expanded its research scope to include commercial fisheries. The installation of an advanced seawater system in 1972 enabled sophisticated marine research, and in 1975 the facility became part of the Southwest Fisheries Center.

Paul F. Romberg, then-president of SFSU, proposed the creation of a field station and marine lab at the site. In 1978, the university began acquiring the land from the federal government for $1, under the condition that the site be used for education. The campus was originally named the Romberg Tiburon Center for Environmental Sciences.

In 2017, the Estuary & Ocean Science Center was created. The campus was renamed the Romberg Tiburon Campus.

A master plan was being drafted for the campus as it has never had a master plan formally prepared and adopted by the campus or the CSU Board of Trustees. An approved master plan and certified environmental impact statement were required before the university could begin significant construction projects at the campus.

In 2025, the university announced that this campus would close due to financial struggles, but the closure was delayed after a fundraising campaign yielded $3.2 million. It was announced in August 2026 that the campus would close at the end of September.

== Campus ==
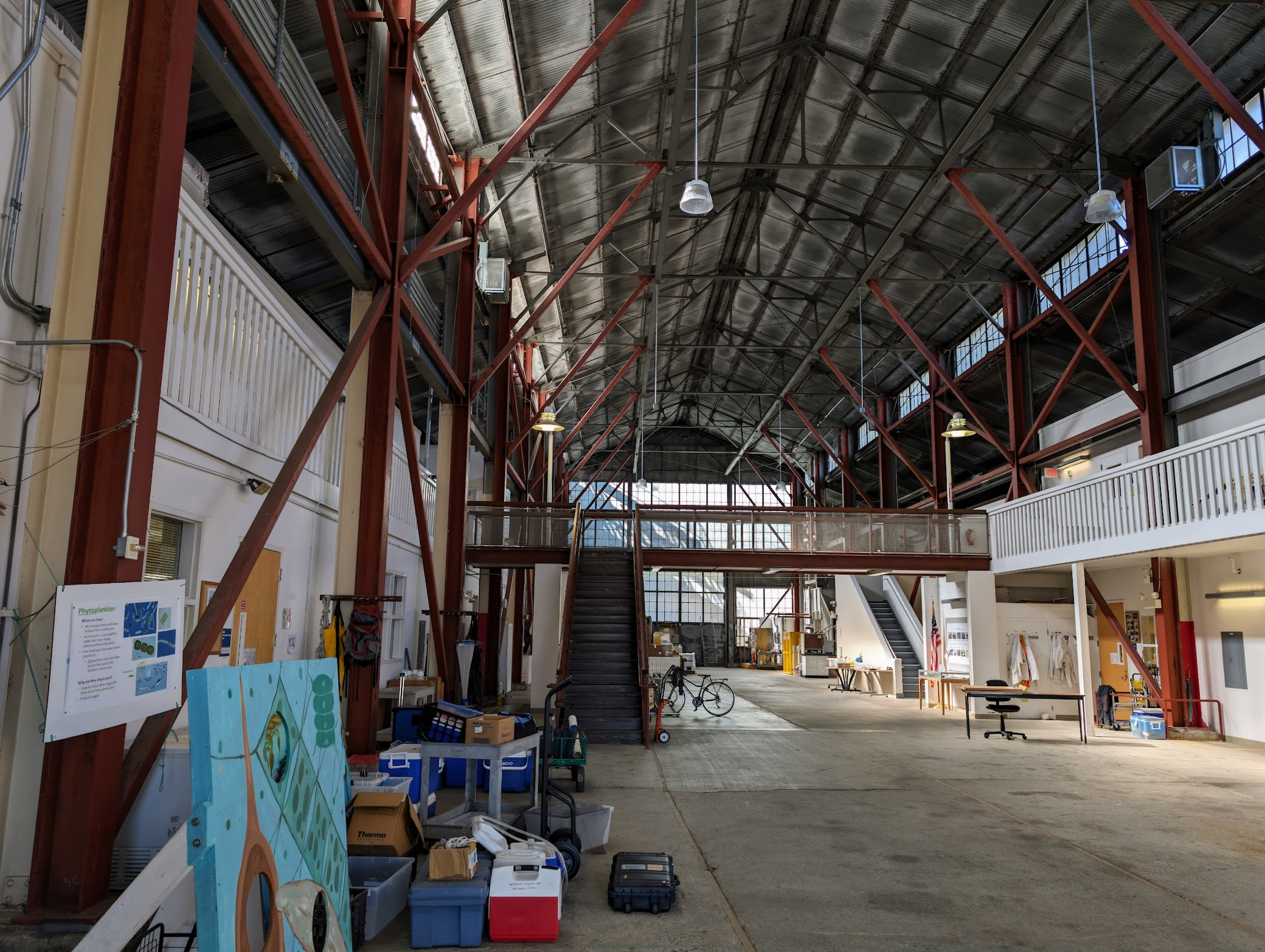
Inside Delta Hall

The campus sits between two affluent, residential neighborhoods, the small Tiburon Uplands nature preserve, and the San Francisco Bay. Its addresses are 3150 and 3152 Paradise Drive in Tiburon, California. The campus is 20 miles north of SFSU's main campus.

There are eight occupied buildings at the campus.

- Bay Conference Center
- Delta Hall
- Estuary Hall
- Farallon Hall
- Greenhouse
- Ohrenschall Guest House
- N. Barracks
- S. Barracks
