= Fort Belvedere =

Fort Belvedere may refer to:

- Belvedere (fort), a 16th-century fort in Florence, Italy, built by Grand Duke Ferdinando I de' Medici
- Fort Belvedere, Surrey, the country home of King Edward VIII, scene of his 1936 abdication
- "Fort Belvedere", a song by American postpunk band Live Skull from their 1986 album Cloud One

== See also ==
- Belvedere (disambiguation)
