= Labská Stráň =

- Municipality
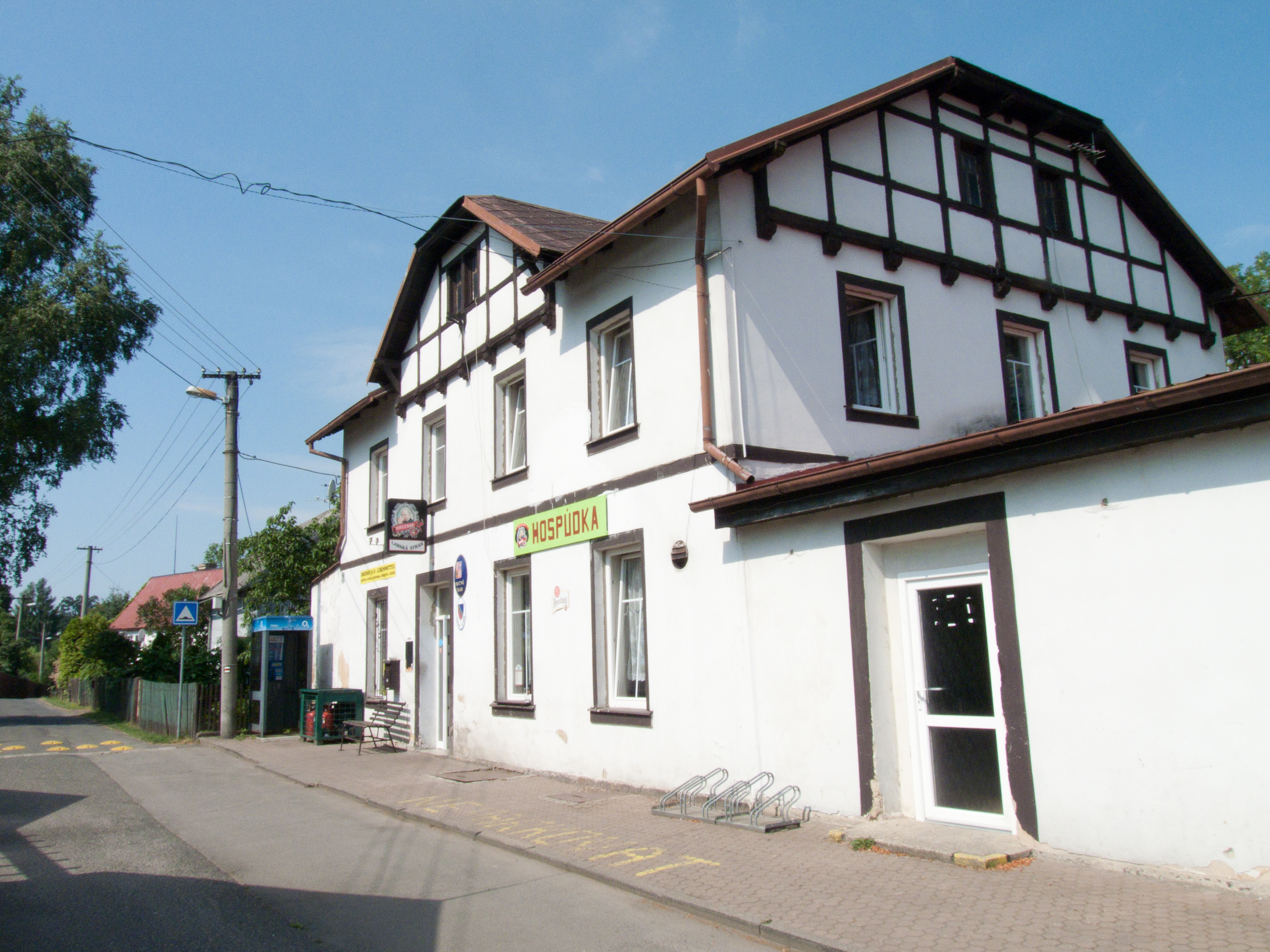
- Municipal office

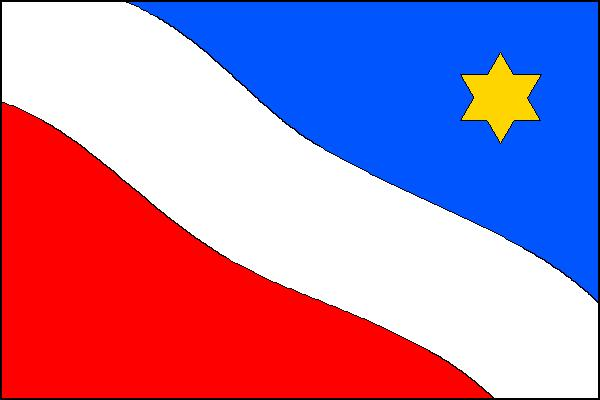
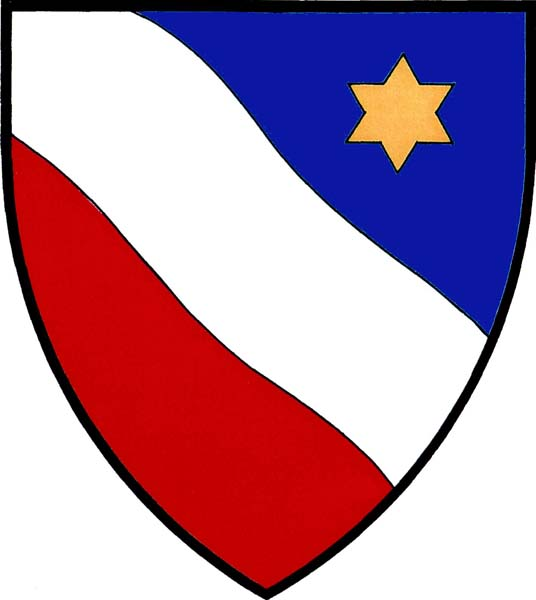
- Flag Coat of arms

- Location in the Czech Republic
- Coordinates: 50°50′55″N 14°13′54″E
- Country: Czech Republic
- Region: Ústí nad Labem
- District: Děčín
- First mentioned: 1614

Area
  - Total: 2.88 km^{2} (1.11 sq mi)
- Elevation: 325 m (1,066 ft)

Population (2026-01-01)
  - Total: 239
  - Density: 83.0/km^{2} (215/sq mi)
- Time zone: UTC+1 (CET)
  - Summer (DST): UTC+2 (CEST)
- Postal code: 407 14
- Website: www.labskastran.cz

Labská Stráň (German: Elbleiten) is a municipality and village in Děčín District in the Ústí nad Labem Region of the Czech Republic. It has about 200 inhabitants.

Labská Stráň lies approximately 10 kilometres (6 mi) north of Děčín, 26 km (16 mi) north-east of Ústí nad Labem, and 86 km (53 mi) north of Prague.

== Demographics ==
Historical population
Year	Pop.	±%
1869	572	—
1880	573	+0.2%
1890	592	+3.3%
1900	573	−3.2%
1910	563	−1.7%
1921	484	−14.0%
1930	459	−5.2%
1950	257	−44.0%
1961	272	+5.8%
1970	252	−7.4%
1980	195	−22.6%
1991	158	−19.0%
2001	191	+20.9%
2011	203	+6.3%
2021	229	+12.8%
Source: Censuses

== Sights ==
Belvedér viewing point is located in the municipality.
