= Koromači–Boškini =

Koromači–Boškini Collepiano-Boschini
- Location in Slovenia
- Coordinates: 45°27′58.43″N 13°50′1.7″E
- Country: Slovenia
- Traditional region: Littoral
- Statistical region: Coastal–Karst
- Municipality: Koper

Area
  - Total: 1.09 km^{2} (0.42 sq mi)
- Elevation: 412.5 m (1,353 ft)

Population (2002)
  - Total: 34

Koromači–Boškini (pronounced [kɔɾɔˈmaːtʃi bɔˈʃkiːni]; Slovene: Koromači - Boškini, Italian: Collepiano-Boschini) is a small settlement in the City Municipality of Koper in the Littoral region of Slovenia.

== History ==
In 1954, when the Free Territory of Trieste was dissolved and Zone B was assigned to Yugoslavia, Koromači–Boškini (together with Abitanti, Belvedur, Brezovica pri Gradinu, Gradin, Močunigi, Pregara, and Sirči) was originally assigned to the Socialist Republic of Croatia. In 1956 these villages were reassigned to the Socialist Republic of Slovenia.
