= Pregara =

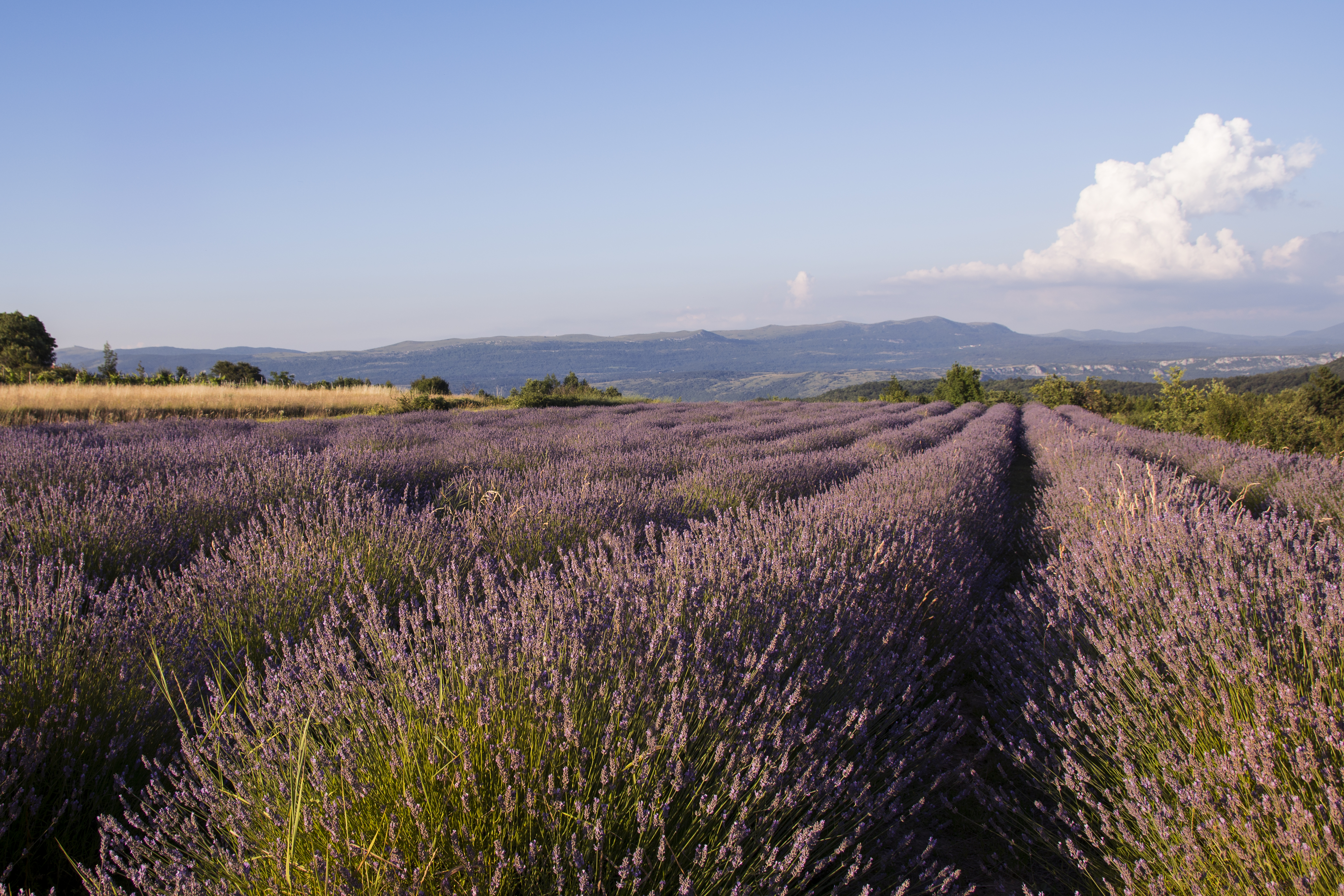
- Lavender field in Pregara

- Location in Slovenia
- Coordinates: 45°26′39.23″N 13°51′54.7″E
- Country: Slovenia
- Traditional region: Littoral
- Statistical region: Coastal–Karst
- Municipality: Koper

Area
  - Total: 8.05 km^{2} (3.11 sq mi)
- Elevation: 445.4 m (1,461 ft)

Population (2002)
  - Total: 166

Pregara (pronounced [pɾɛˈɡaːɾa]) is a village in the City Municipality of Koper in the Littoral region of Slovenia on the border with Croatia.

== History ==
In 1954, when the Free Territory of Trieste was dissolved and Zone B was assigned to Yugoslavia, Pregara (together with Abitanti, Belvedur, Brezovica pri Gradinu, Gradin, Koromači–Boškini, Močunigi, and Sirči) was originally assigned to the Socialist Republic of Croatia. In 1956 these villages were reassigned to the Socialist Republic of Slovenia.

== Church ==
The parish church in the settlement is dedicated to Our Lady of Mount Carmel. A chapel outside the settlement, next to the cemetery, is dedicated to Saint Simon.
