= Belvedere, Alberta =

Coordinates: 53.985°N 114.3494444°W

Belvedere is a locality in Alberta, Canada.

The community was named from the Italian belvedere, due to the site's lofty elevation.
