= El Potrero River =

River in El Salvador

- Location of mouth

Location
- Country: El Salvador

Physical characteristics
- Mouth
  - coordinates: 13°20′N 88°41′W

El Potrero River (Rio El Potrero) is a medium streams in El Salvador. It is located at 13°20′N 88°41′W, and has at least large to moderate quantities of fresh water year round, especially from early May through October.
