= Belvedur =

Belvedur Belvedere
- Location in Slovenia
- Coordinates: 45°27′48.73″N 13°49′31.52″E
- Country: Slovenia
- Traditional region: Littoral
- Statistical region: Coastal–Karst
- Municipality: Koper

Area
  - Total: 0.716 km^{2} (0.276 sq mi)

Population (2026)
  - Total: 5
  - Density: 7/km^{2} (18/sq mi)

Belvedur (pronounced [bɛlʋɛˈduːɾ]; Italian: Belvedere) is a small settlement in the City Municipality of Koper in the Littoral region of Slovenia. In January 2026, the population was 5.

== History ==
In 1954, when the Free Territory of Trieste was dissolved and Zone B was assigned to Yugoslavia, Belvedur (together with Abitanti, Brezovica pri Gradinu, Gradin, Koromači–Boškini, Močunigi, Pregara, and Sirči) was originally assigned to the Socialist Republic of Croatia. In 1956 these villages were reassigned to the Socialist Republic of Slovenia.
