= Belvedere Island =

Island in Marin County, California, United States

El Potrero de la Punta del Tiburon, Kashow's Island, Peninsula Island, Promontory Island, Still Island
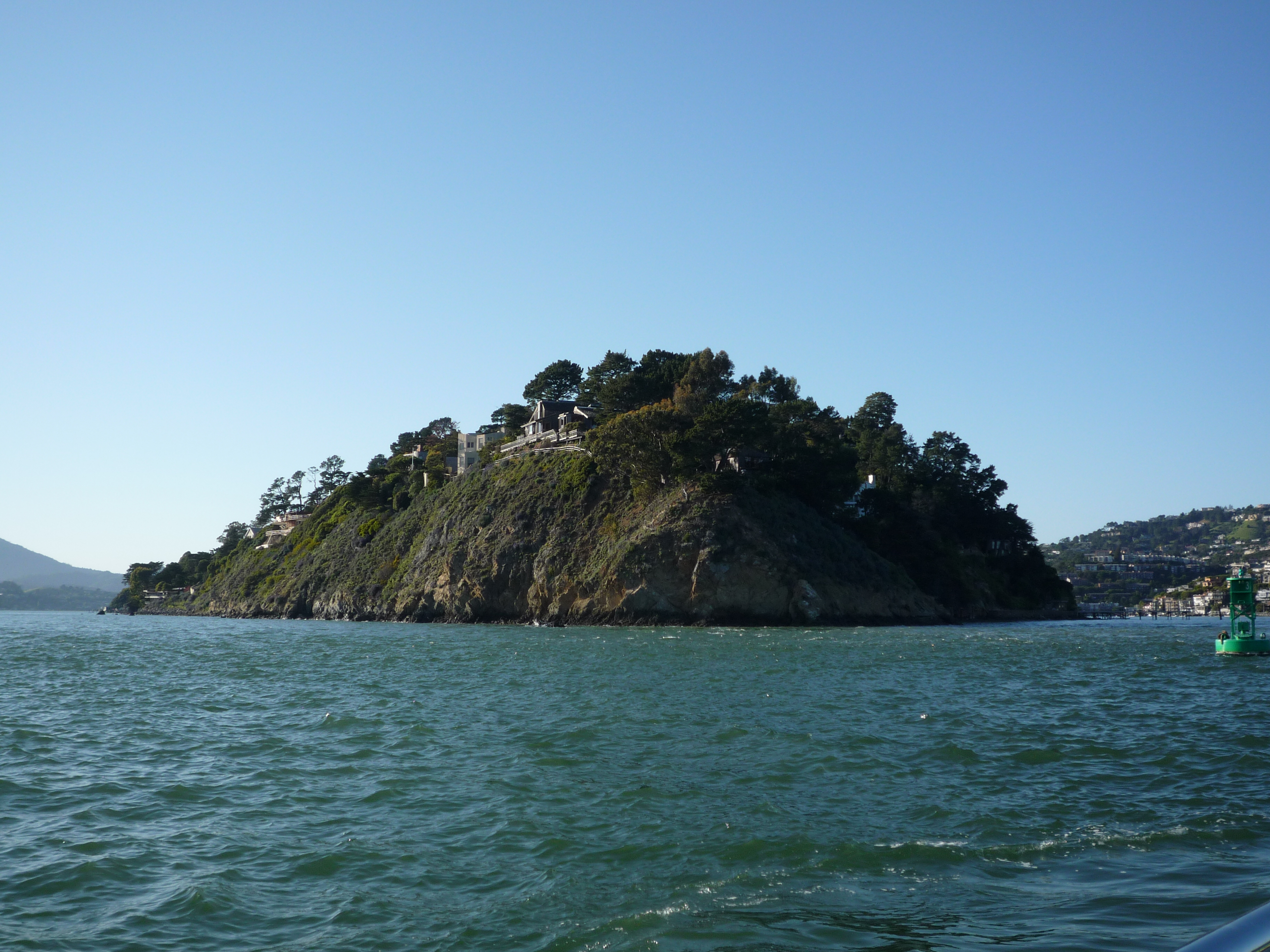
- Belvedere Island in 2010

- Location within San Francisco Bay Area Location within California Location within the United States

Geography
- Coordinates: 37.87158°N 122.46849°W

Administration
- United States
- State: California
- County: Marin

Belvedere Island (formerly, El Potrero de la Punta del Tiburon, Kashow's Island, Peninsula Island, Promontory Island, and Still Island) is a rocky island in the San Francisco Bay in Marin County, California which was formerly separated by a marsh from the mainland, though has since been linked by two spits. Part of the town of Belvedere, California is located on the island.

== Natural history ==
There are a variety of flora and fauna represented on Belvedere Island. The presence of herons has been noted for a considerable period of time. Some of the flora are common to nearby Ring Mountain (on the Tiburon Peninsula), where a considerable floral biodiversity has been documented. Ring Mountain has also been established to have been a settlement area for early Native American inhabitants of this local area.

== History ==
The area of Tiburon was originally populated by the Coast Miwok indigenous people. There is evidence that they would have visited the island.

In 1834, the first Mexican land grant in Marin gave the island to John Reed. It was called El Potrero de la Punta del Tiburon (The Paddock of Tiburon Point) during the time.

Israel Kashow, an American from Ohio who came to California as a Forty-Niner, was one of the first people to establish a permanent habitation on the island. He lived on the island and ran a fishery. He was later evicted from the island by a court order filed by heirs to John Reed's estate. During this time the island was known as Kashow's Island.

In 1890, the Belvedere Land Co. acquired the island and renamed it to Belvedere Island and developed the island into a summer retreat for the wealthy.

In 1896, Belvedere incorporated as a city (composing the island, nearby Corinthian Island, and part of the Tiburon Peninsula) and a post office was established the following year.

Throughout this time, the marshes that separated the island from Tiburon Point had become paved over by roads for direct access to the island, with the first state highway being built in 1930. It is now connected by two causeways (Beach Road and San Rafael Avenue) and connected to the mainland via landfill, therefore not being technically an island anymore. The two narrow strips of land for the causeways now form the artificial Belvedere Lagoon.

Belvedere is currently primarily residences and is home to the eighth highest-income community in the United States.

== Geology ==
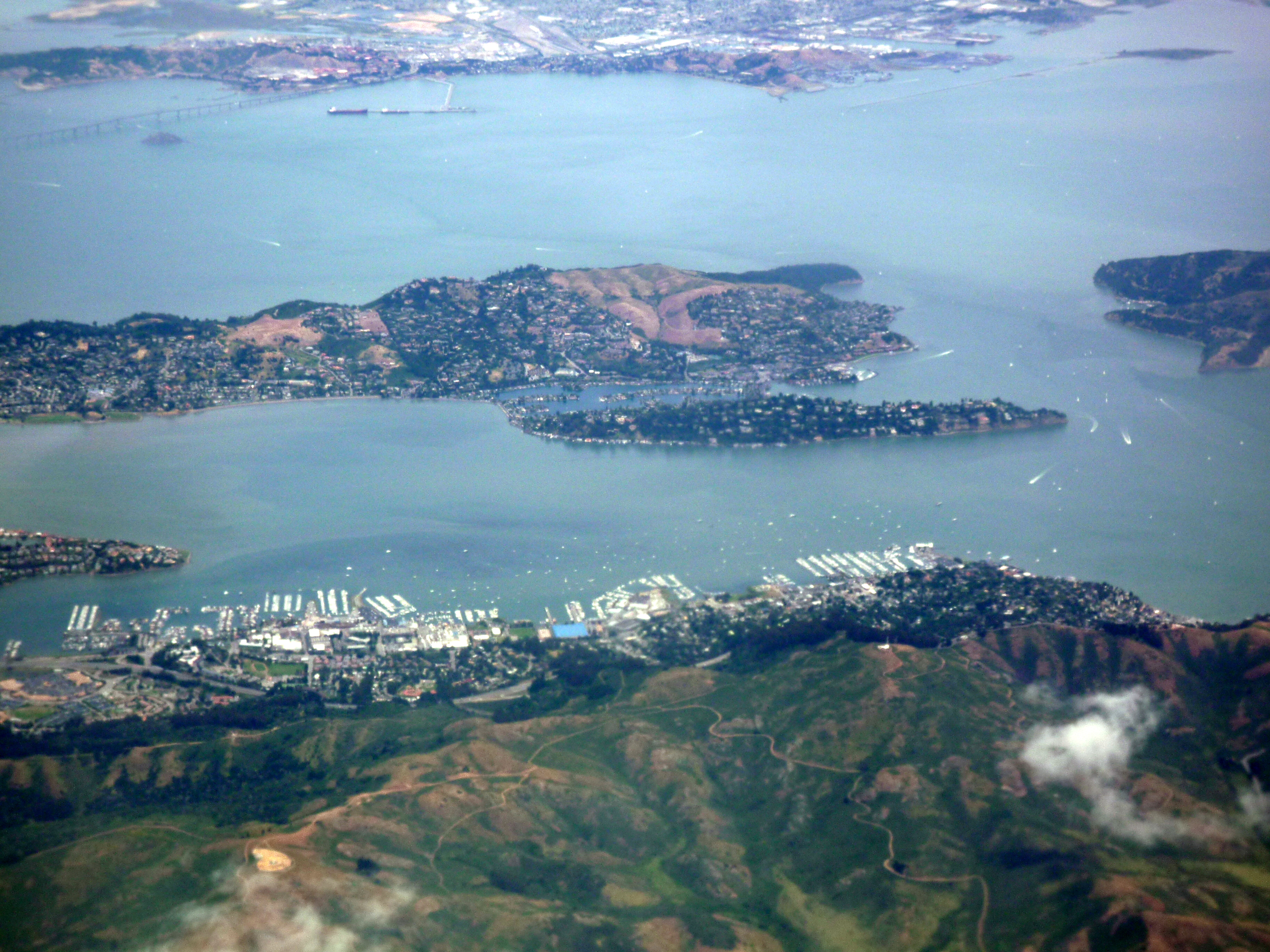
Aerial view from 2010 of Belvedere Island and the Tiburon Peninsula

A USGS survey of the island describes the island as being composed of Franciscan sandstone and Franciscan Greenstone, forming a part of the Franciscan Complex.
