= Belvedere (West Virginia) =

Historic house in West Virginia, United States

- U.S. National Register of Historic Places
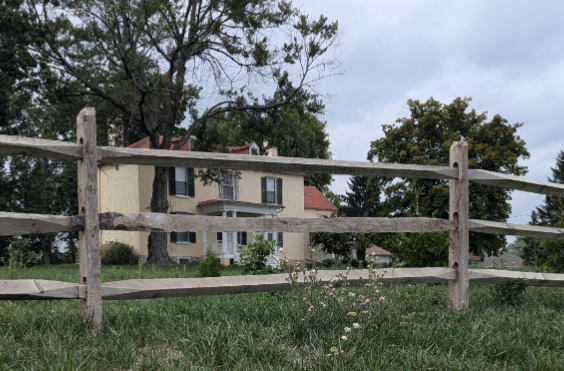

- Location within West Virginia Location within the United States
- Nearest city: Charles Town, West Virginia
- Coordinates: 39°17′5″N 77°50′43″W
- Built: 1807
- Architectural style: Federal
- NRHP reference No.: 84003588
- Added to NRHP: January 12, 1984

Belvedere, also known as Belvidere, was built near Charles Town, West Virginia by Magnus Tate II in 1807. The Federal style mansion is situated at the end of a tree-lined driveway and commands a sweeping view of the Blue Ridge Mountains. The house grew from the original "kitchen house" section to a formal three-bay brick main house built in 1824 by Magnus's son WIlliam, which were separate until they were connected in 1939.

The site was inhabited by the Tate family from the 1760s. Magnus Tate II (1732-1808) was a founder of Charles Town, and his four sons were all born at Belvedere. Magnus Tate III (1767-1823) served in the Virginia Assembly before serving from 1815 to 1817 in the U.S. House of Representatives. Belvedere passed to William Tate (1776-1818), and then to his son, George Tate II. The house passed out of the Tate family in 1882.

== Description ==
The two-story brick house is one room deep with a center hall the depth of the house. A three-part central window on the second floor complements the sidelights and transom at the front door below. A small entrance porch with paired columns is original to the house. The end of the older section flanking the 1824 house features a rosette window at attic level and a side door with a transom and sidelights, both in the gable elevation.

== See also ==
- Tackley Farm
