= Belvedere Lagoon =

Lagoon in the state of California, United States

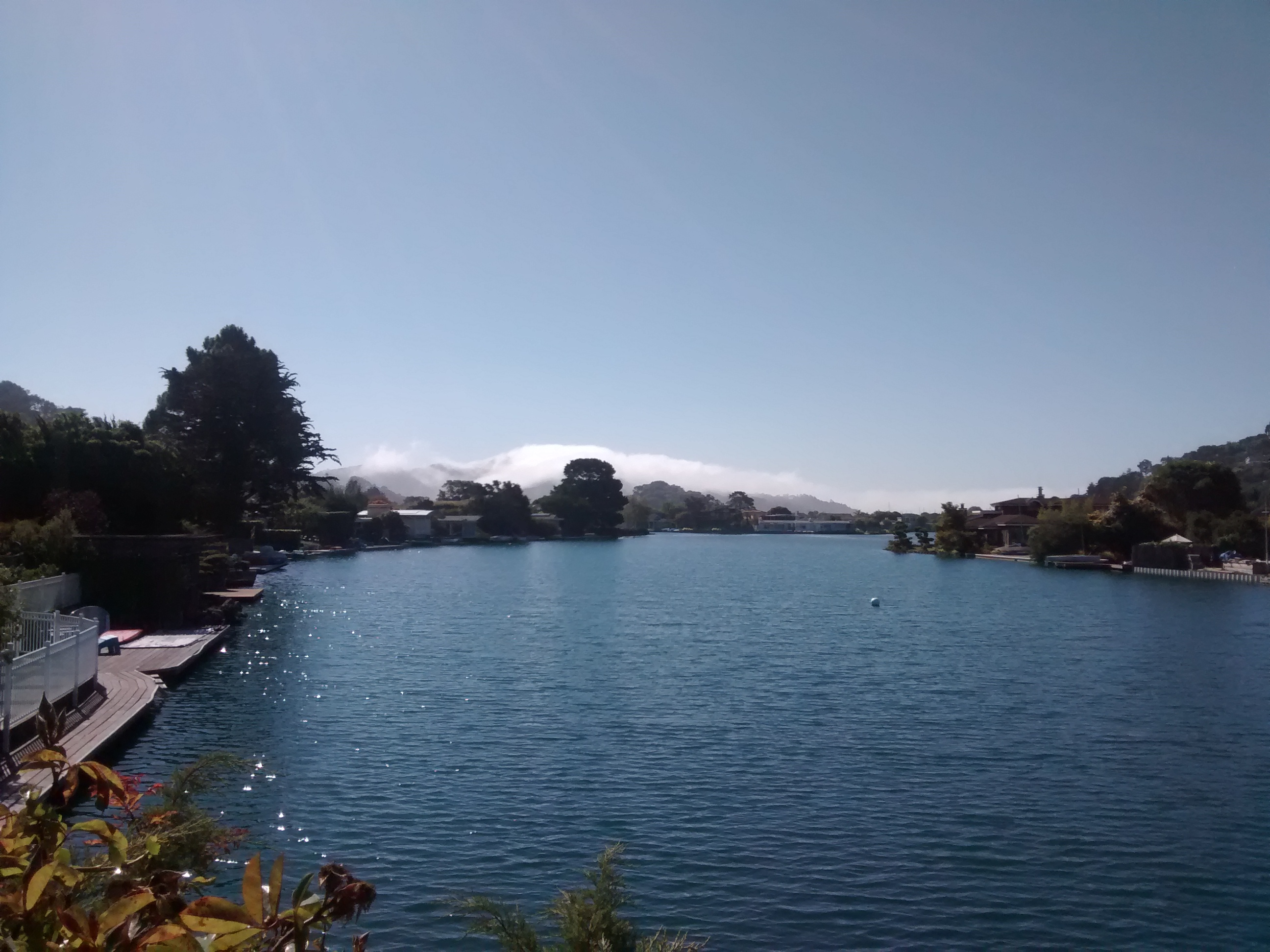

- Location within California
- Location: Marin County, California
- Coordinates: 37.876871°N 122.467473°W
- Type: Lagoon
- Basin countries: United States
- Surface area: 66 acres (27 ha)
- Average depth: 5 ft (1.5 m)
- Water volume: 330 acre⋅ft (410,000 m^{3})
- Surface elevation: 0 m (0 ft) sea level
- Settlements: Belvedere, California
- References: U.S. Geological Survey Geographic Names Information System: Belvedere Lagoon

Belvedere Lagoon is an artificial lagoon on San Francisco Bay in Belvedere in Marin County, California. Narrow strips of land separate it from Richardson Bay (to the northwest) and Raccoon Strait.

The lagoon is owned and maintained by the Belvedere Lagoon Property Owners' Association. The lagoon is not accessible by boat from San Francisco Bay, and no public access is provided. Until somewhat late in the 20th century houseboats were present in Belvedere Lagoon.

There used to be a natural passage between the lagoon and the San Francisco Bay through the southern spit. The passage was spanned by a drawbridge. From the late 19th century, the drawbridge would be raised twice a year, once in the spring to allow pleasure boats of the Corinthian Yacht Club to exit the lagoon, where the boats wintered, and go to their summer moorings, and once in the fall, to allow the boats to return. This raising of the drawbridge signaled the beginning of the pleasure boat season. In 1917, that informal celebration morphed into a more formal and elaborate parade of boats that has now evolved into the Opening Day on the Bay involving the 104 clubs of the Pacific Inter-Club Yacht Association.

Belvedere Lagoon was partially filled after World War II to provide building sites for tract houses and to improve access to Belvedere Island. It was also once the site of a 9-hole golf course.

== See also ==
- List of lakes in California
- Strawberry Lagoon
