= Belvedere Palace Chapel =

Chapel in Vienna, Austria

Coordinates: 48°11′29″N 16°22′51″E

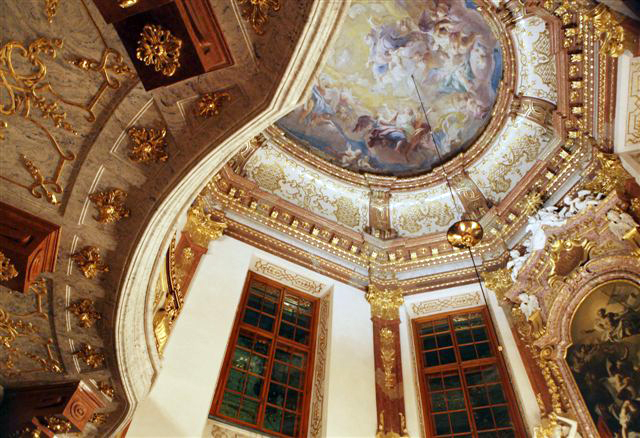
Belvedere Palace Chapel

Belvedere Palace Chapel is a chapel located in the south eastern corner tower of the Upper Belvedere in Vienna, Austria. It was designed by the Austrian architect Johann Lukas von Hildebrandt.

== History ==
Construction of the chapel was completed in 1723. The Palace Chapel was first opened to the public in May 1753. Up to this time, it had been reserved for the daily prayers of Prince Eugene and a select group of eminent individuals made up of the nobility, artists, and scholars. An Inventory of the Imperial and Royal Palace Chapel in the Belvedere from 1776 lists all the articles required to hold a Holy Mass. It can therefore be assumed with certainty that it was used for ecclesiastical purposes. At the end of the war in 1918 and the abdication of the last emperor of the Habsburg monarchy, the palace ensemble became state property. While both palaces were severely damaged during World War II, the Belvedere Palace Chapel survived intact.

The chapel initially remained unused, but was returned to its original use under the direction of Hans Aurenhammer. Commemorative Masses were celebrated each year on two occasions: on April 21, the anniversary of the death of Prince Eugene of Savoy, and on June 28, the anniversary of the death of Archduke Franz Ferdinand of Austria. Hans Aurenhammer's successor as director, Hubert Adolph, initiated regular Sunday Mass in the Palace Chapel that was open to the public. This Mass was conducted on an alternating basis by priests from St. Elisabeth's Church and St. Paul's Church. In addition, Adolph had a small organ fitted in the chapel.

As federal government property, the chapel is part of the Belvedere's museological collection. As part of an agreement with the federal government, it is now open every Sunday at midday for Catholic Holy Mass. According to ecclesiastical law, the chapel is situated in the Viennese parish of St. Charles Borromeo. In recent decades, Mass in the Belvedere Palace Chapel has been celebrated by the military chaplain, Monsignor Professor Alfred Sammer.

== Description ==
The chapel is decorated in red-brownish and stucco marbling with contrasting white walls and gold gildings. The impression evokes the two marble halls in the Upper and Lower Belvedere. Hildebrandt used the best available artists for the decoration.

The Resurrection of Jesus Christ altarpiece was painted by Neapolitan painter Francesco Solimena over a period of ten years and completed in 1729. A model of Solimena's altarpiece by Santino Bussi is displayed in the hall next to the chapel. Bussi was also responsible for the jewelry in the remaining halls of the Upper Belvedere. The sculptures of Saint John the Baptist and Saint Peter were executed by Domenico Parodi from Genoa.

The ceiling fresco is by Carlo Innocenzo Carlone from northern Italy and depicts God the Father with the Holy Spirit as a dove surrounded by angels. It was completed in 1723. The fresco figures of God the Father and the Holy Spirit, along with Jesus Christ in the altarpiece, form a trinity.
