= Belvédère Hotel, Furka Pass =

Hotel building in Valais, Switzerland

Belvedere Hotel
- Hôtel Belvédère
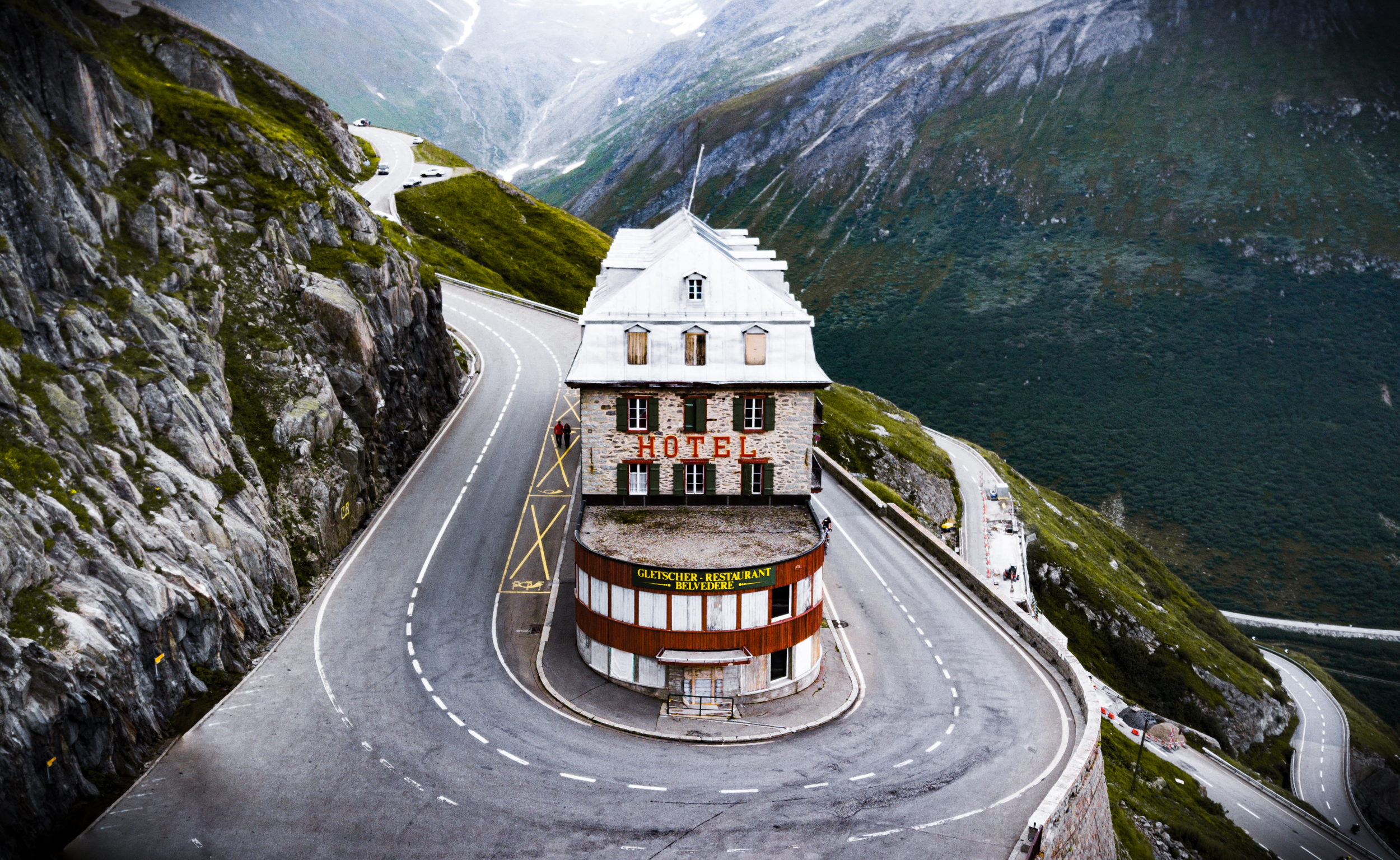
- The Belvédère Hotel in 2018
- Interactive map of the Belvedere Hotel area

General information
- Location: Furkastrasse 378, 3999, Obergoms, Goms District, Valais, Switzerland
- Coordinates: 46°34′36.052″N 8°23′18.240″E
- Completed: 1882
- Renovated: 1890, 1903, 1990
- Closed: 2015

Design and construction
- Developer: Josef Seiler

The Hotel Belvédère is a former hotel located on the Furka Pass near the Rhône Glacier in Switzerland.

== History ==
The Furka Pass road was opened between 1866 and 1867, and connects the Valais valley to the Uranaise valley previously cut by the Furkastock. In 1882, Josef Seiler built a lodge located in a hairpin created by the road. While initially serving as a small lodge, it expanded for the first time in 1890 to become a hotel. The construction of a gable roof with two additional floors gave the hotel its current appearance. The rooms, without electricity or running water, were still relatively spartan.

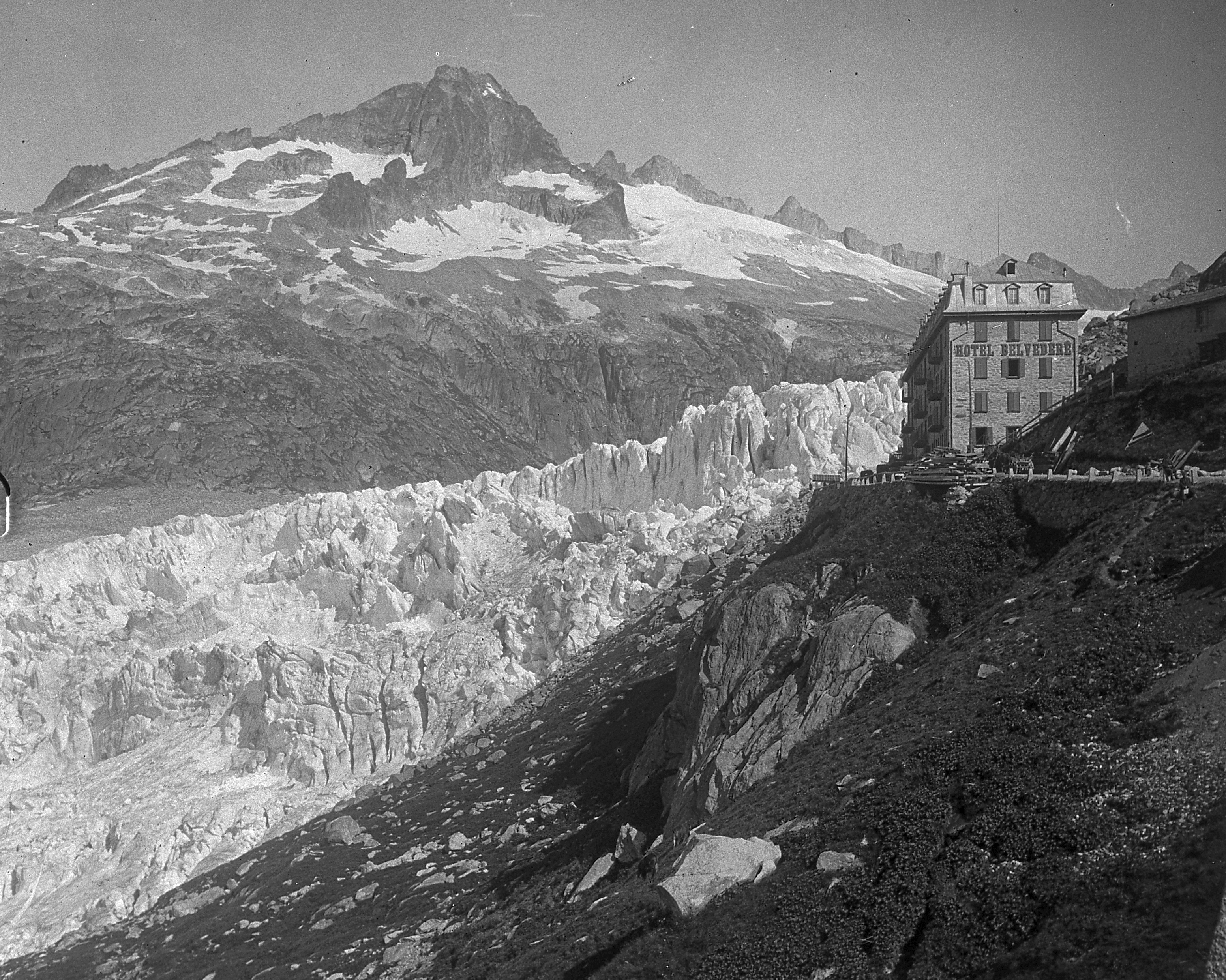
Hotel Belvédère and the Rhône Glacier in 1905.

In 1903, the building underwent a second transformation, propelling it into the Belle Époque and its first period of glory. The hotel then became a luxury property and was very popular for its panoramic views of the valley and the Rhône Glacier, which at the time was a few hundred meters from the road. The number of beds in 1907 then rose to 90.

During the first half of the 20th century, attendance at the Rhône glacier and the hotel continued to increase due to the arrival of the postal bus in 1921 and the opening of two new railway lines: the Furka Oberalp Railway and the Glacier Express in 1930. At that time, the fashionable activity was mountain climbing. Many hikers would travel to the hotel by train or bus and use it as a starting point for hikes.

The hotel experienced a new boom after the World War II with the rise of the personal automobile and the fabulous view of the Rhône Glacier from the hotel. The hotel became a destination for excursions to admire the Rhône glacier and the hotel regularly welcomed prestigious visitors (the Pope John XXIII or Sean Connery).

Although the hotel became well-known internationally following its appearance in the James Bond film Goldfinger in 1964, hotel attendance decreased sharply during the second half of the 20th century with the massive strides in automobile technology making a crossing the Alps to be easily done in one day without the need for overnight stops. In addition, as the Rhône Glacier retreated more than a kilometer from the Belvedere, the view of it from the hotel became less spectacular. The hotel closed for the first time in 1980 and was purchased by the State Council of the canton of Valais with the idea of building a dam there which ultimately never happened. It was then bought in 1988 by the Carlen family, who restored the building to its original state and reopened it in 1990. However, it has been closed again since 2015.

== Images ==
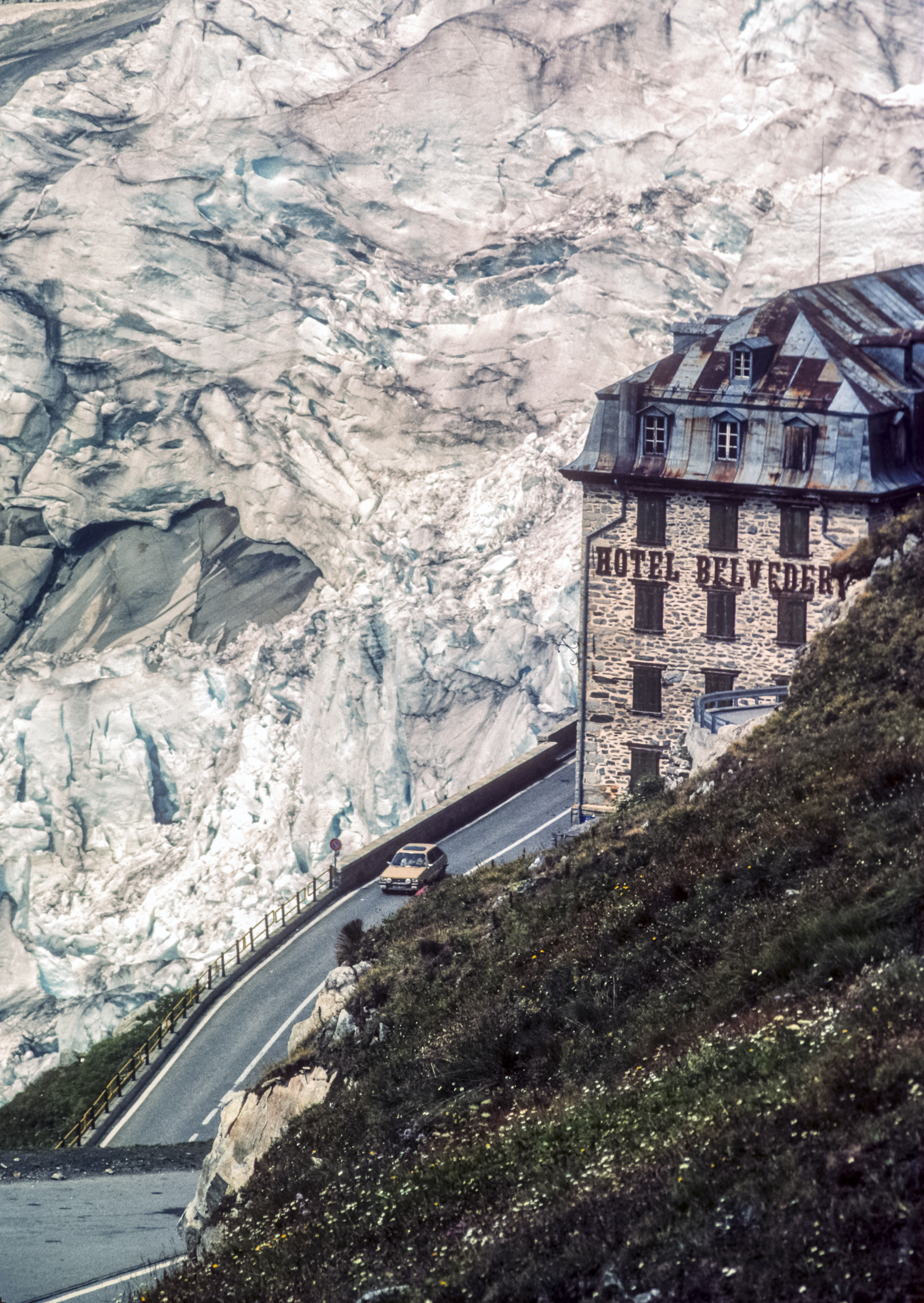
Hotel Belvédère in 1983, during its first closure, from 1980 to 1990.

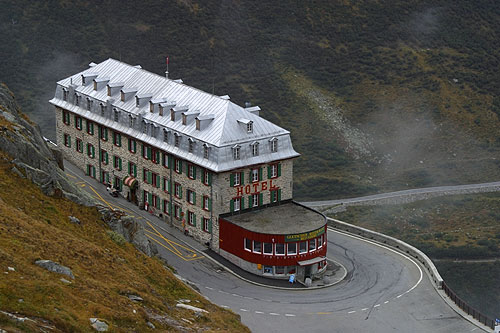
Hotel Belvédère in 2004

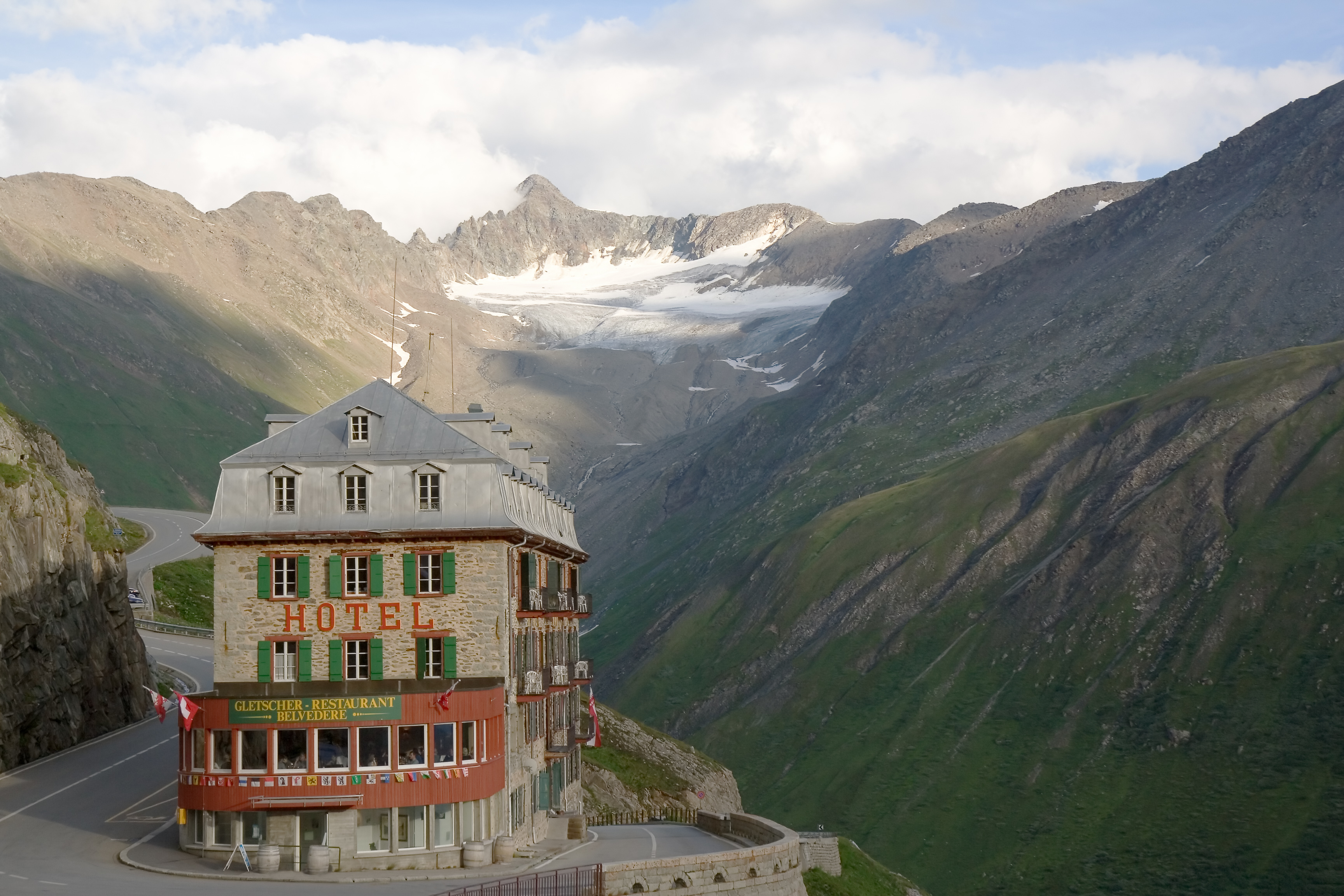
Hotel Belvédère and the Muttgletscher in 2007

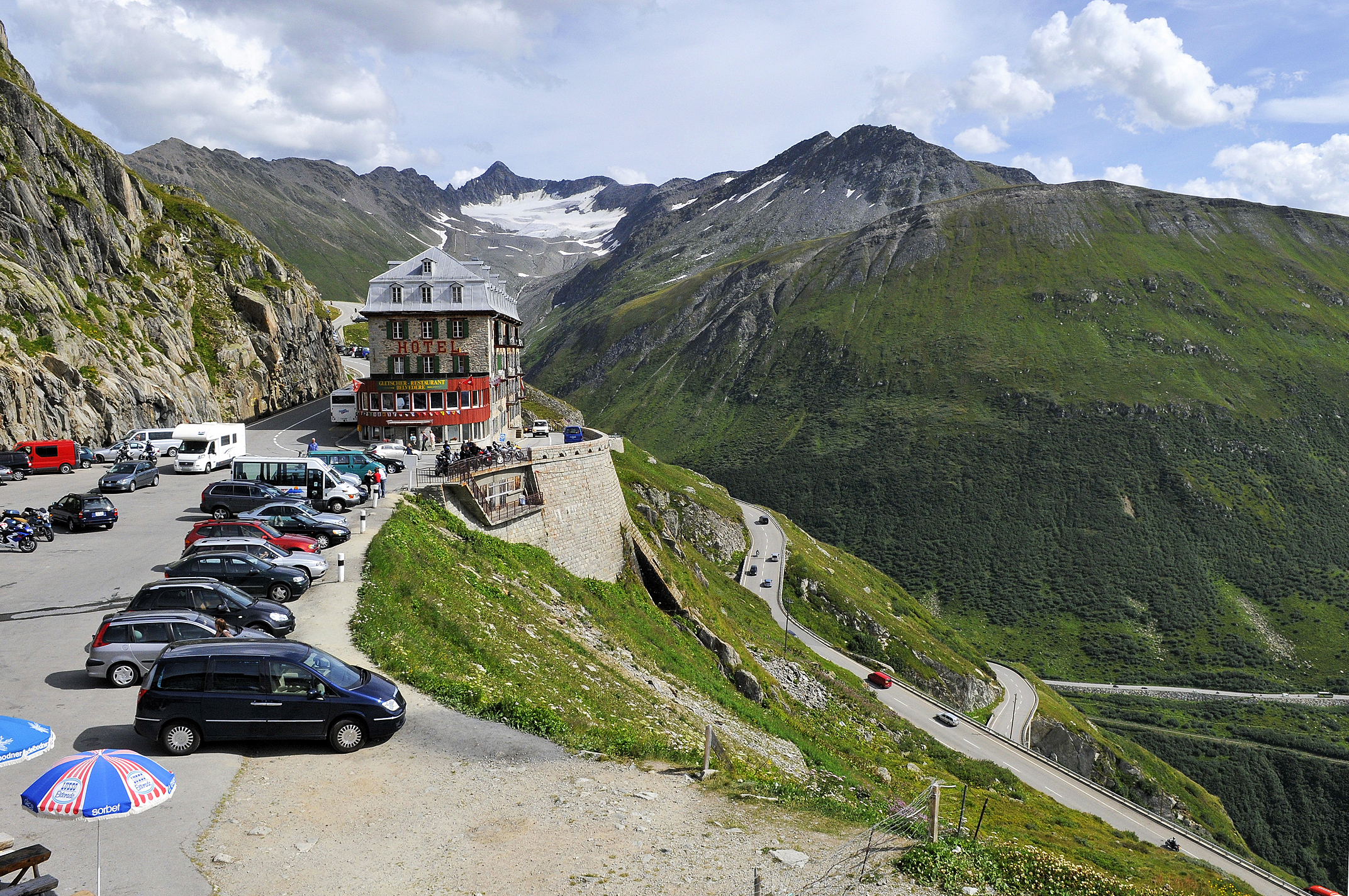
Hôtel Belvédère in 2009

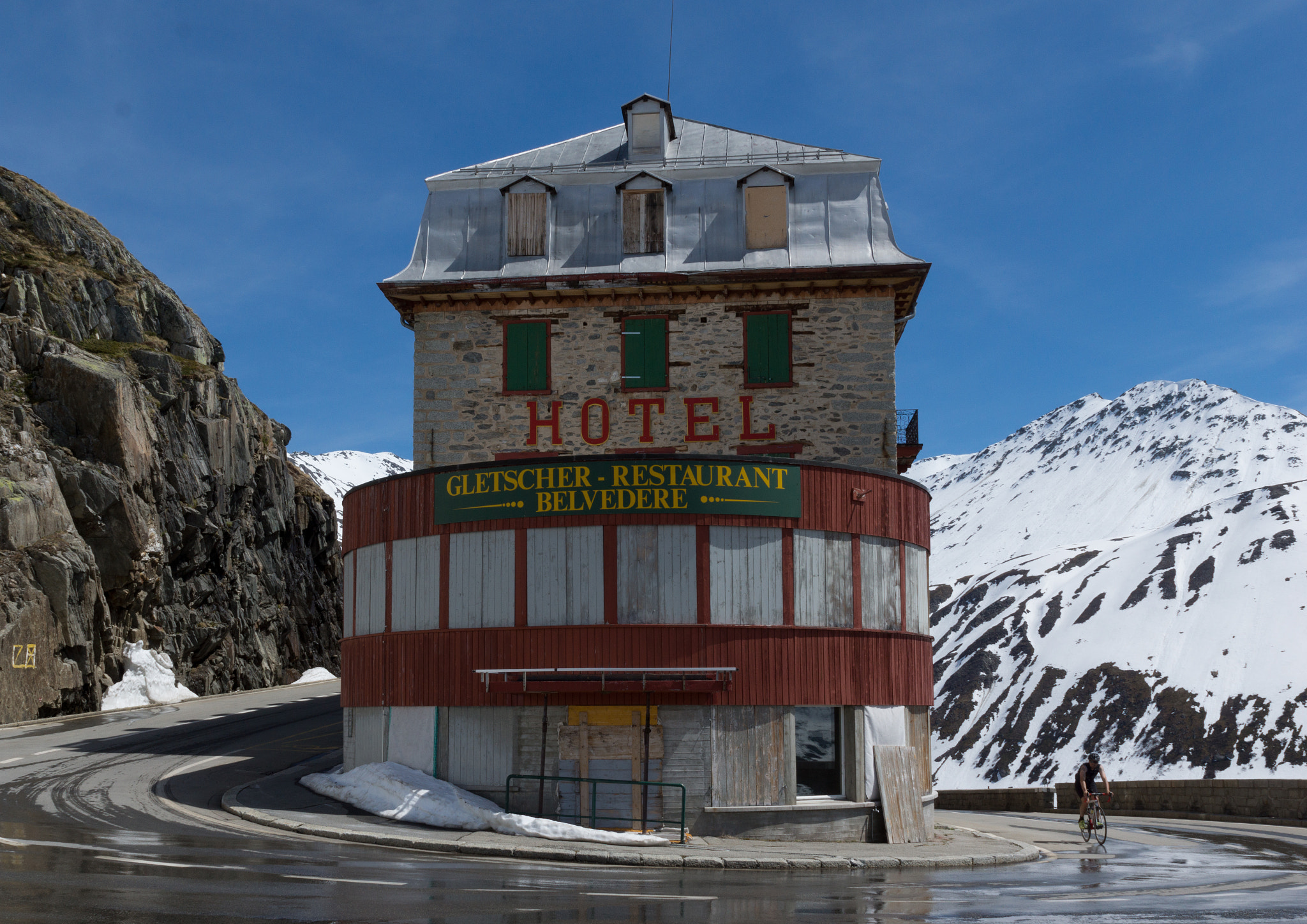
In 2017, the Belvédère Hotel was closed again (since 2015)

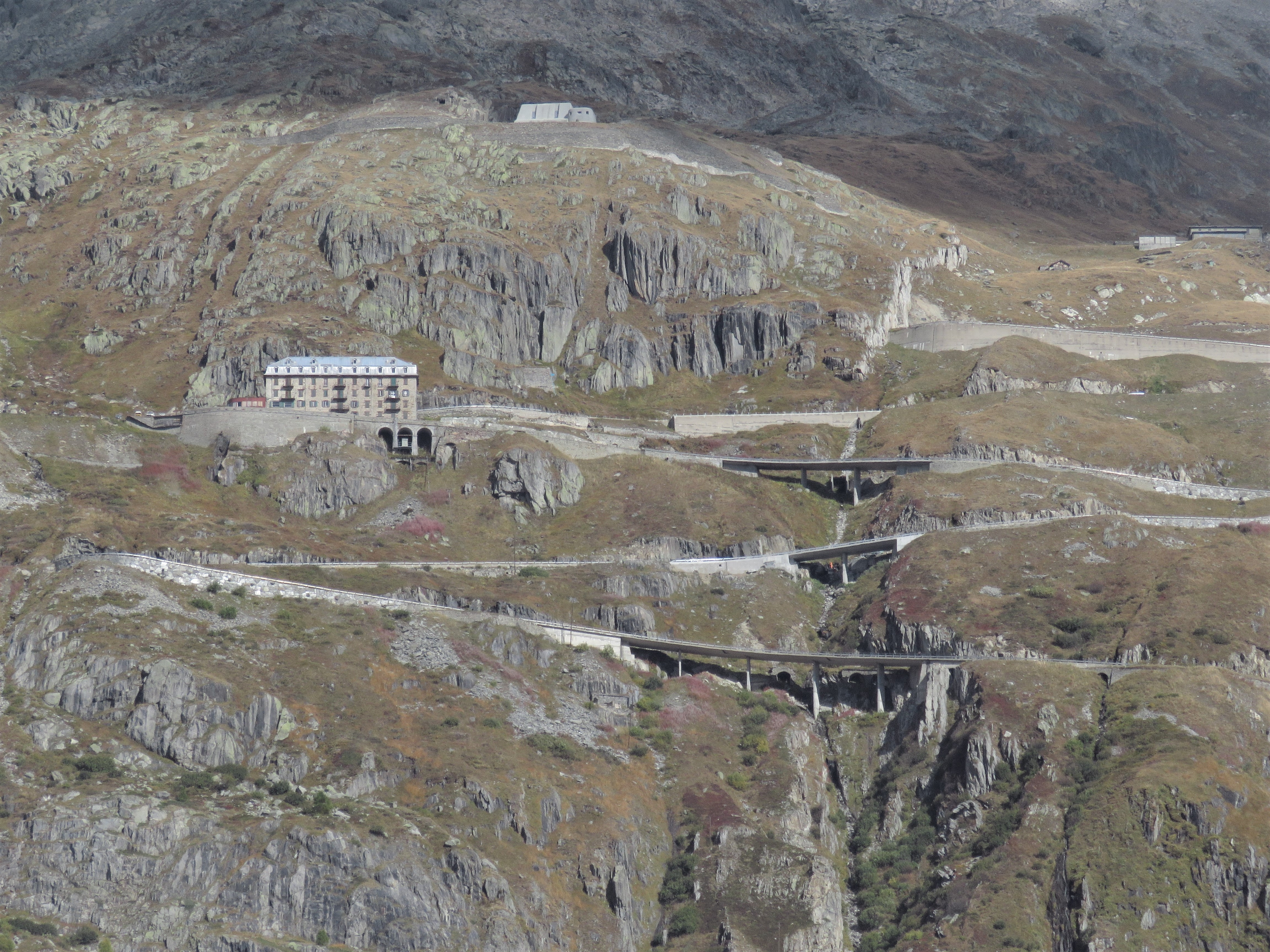
View of the location of the Hotel Belvédère on the Furka Pass (2018)

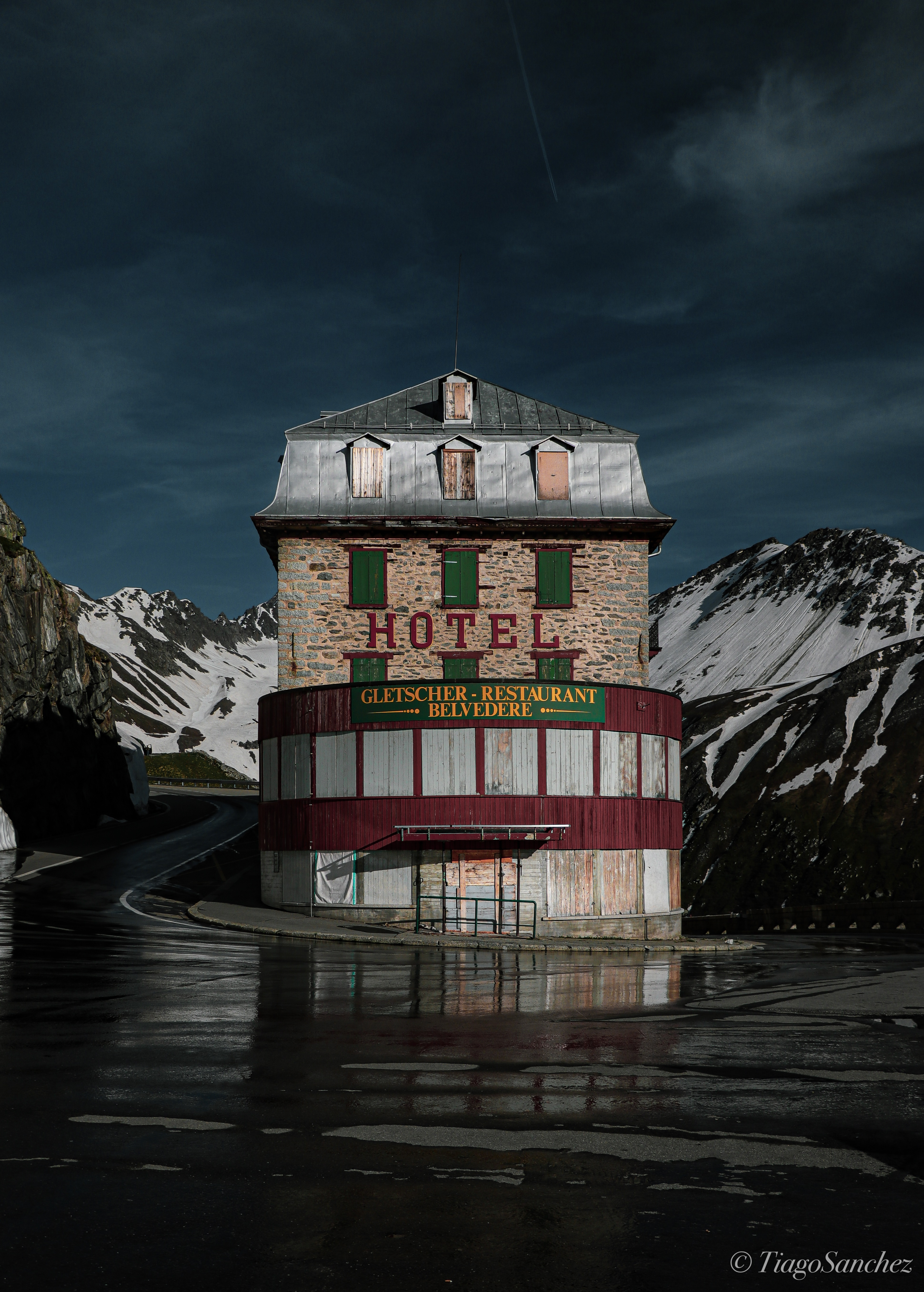
Hôtel Belvédère in 2019

On the right the hotel, in 1919, behind it and on the left the glacier, behind it the mountain

On the right the hotel, in 1919, on the left the glacier, behind it the mountain, on the right the road

== Tributes ==
- The hotel is visible in the third episode of the adventures of James Bond (Goldfinger, from 1964), directed by Guy Hamilton.
- The hotel is visible on the cover of the book Accidentally Wes Anderson by Wally Koval.
