= Potrero Hills (Solano County, California) =

- Location within California Location within the United States

Highest point
- Elevation: 107 m (351 ft)

Geography
- Country: United States
- State: California
- Region: Sacramento–San Joaquin River Delta
- District: Solano County
- Range coordinates: 38°12′17.693″N 121°58′15.869″W
- Topo map: USGS Denverton

Geology
- Rock type: California Coast Ranges

The Potrero Hills are a low mountain range in the Sacramento–San Joaquin River Delta area of southern Solano County, California.

== Geography ==
The range is located in the southwestern Sacramento Valley, northeast of Suisun Bay, and southeast of the city of Fairfield. It is part of the Northern Inner Coast Ranges group in the California Coast Ranges System.

The Rush Ranch Open Space Preserve unit of the San Francisco Bay National Estuarine Research Reserve is located on Suisun Bay at the western side of the Potrero Hills.

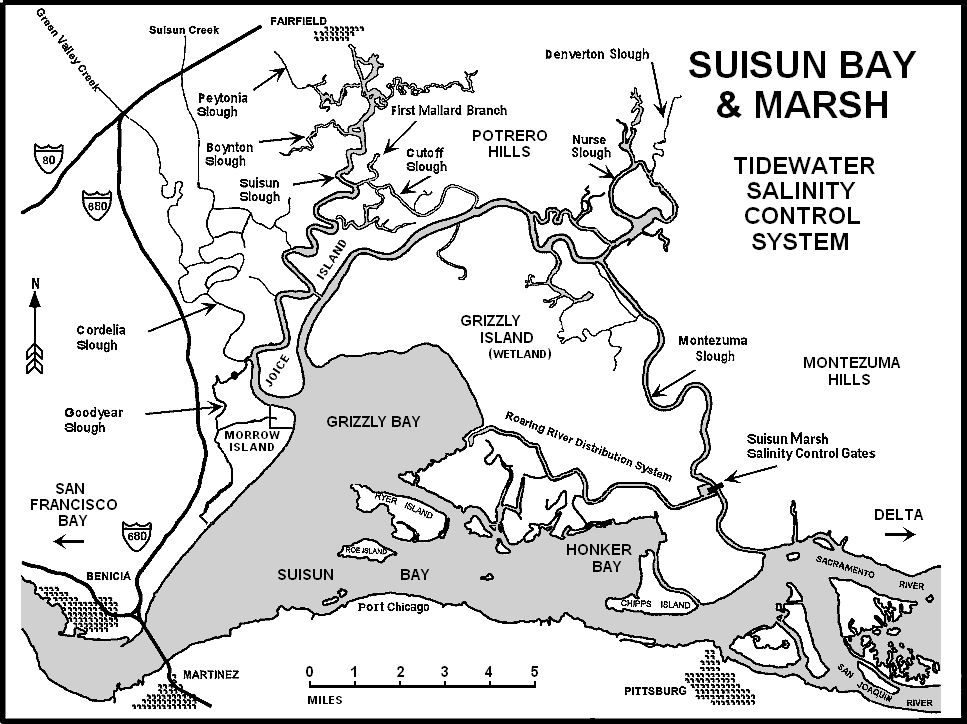
Map of Suisun Bay area, with Potrero Hills in upper center.

== See also ==
- Geography of the Sacramento Valley
- Mountain ranges of the San Francisco Bay Area
