= Belvedér =

Coordinates: 50.84941°N 14.22159°E

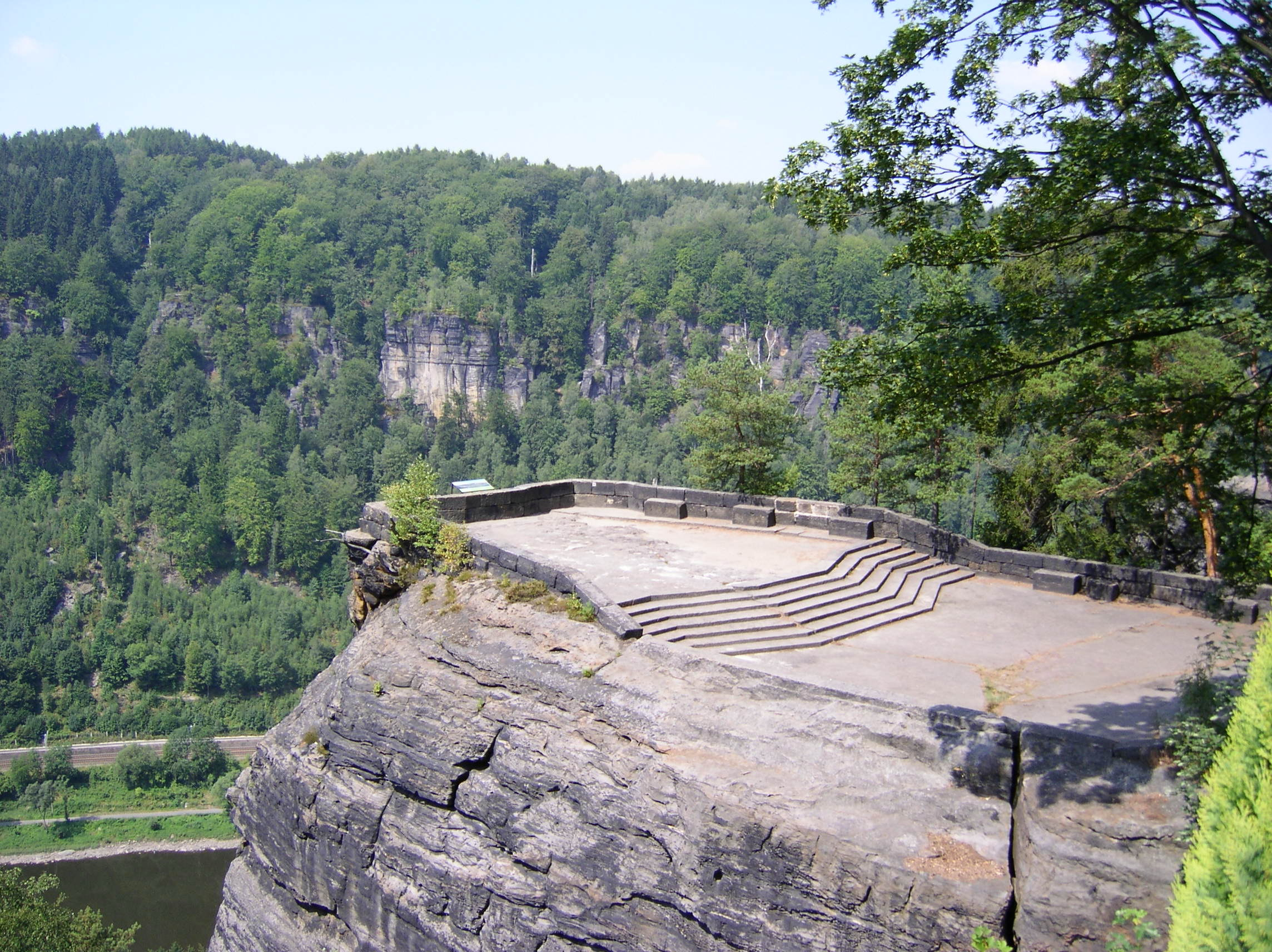
Belvedere view

The Belvedér (German and English: Belvedere) is the oldest viewing point in Bohemian Switzerland in the Czech Republic. It is located near Labská Stráň high above the Elbe valley.

== History ==
Prince Franz-Karl Clary-Aldringen had the viewing terrace laid out at the beginning of the 18th century. An artificial alcove was used for theatre performances and similar events. It was initially decorated by a theatre mask, later by the coat of arms of the princely family. The site was used for recreation and accommodation by the nobility.

An avenue links the Belvedér to their former summer residence – Binsdorf Castle. When the castle burned down in 1790, interest in the viewing point was lost.

As a result, the site became open to tourists. In 1889 a large restaurant opened, that was used after 1945 as a factory holiday home. After 1990 it was privatised again and upgraded into a hotel.

== Views ==
Perched 130 metres over the Elbe the Belvedér has a wonderful view of the Elbe valley. Immediately opposite in the deeply incised Elbe valley is the small village of Dolní Žleb, further downstream the settlements of Čertova Voda and Podskalí can be made out; all three located within the municipal territory of Děčín. In clear weather there are views as far as the city of Děčín.

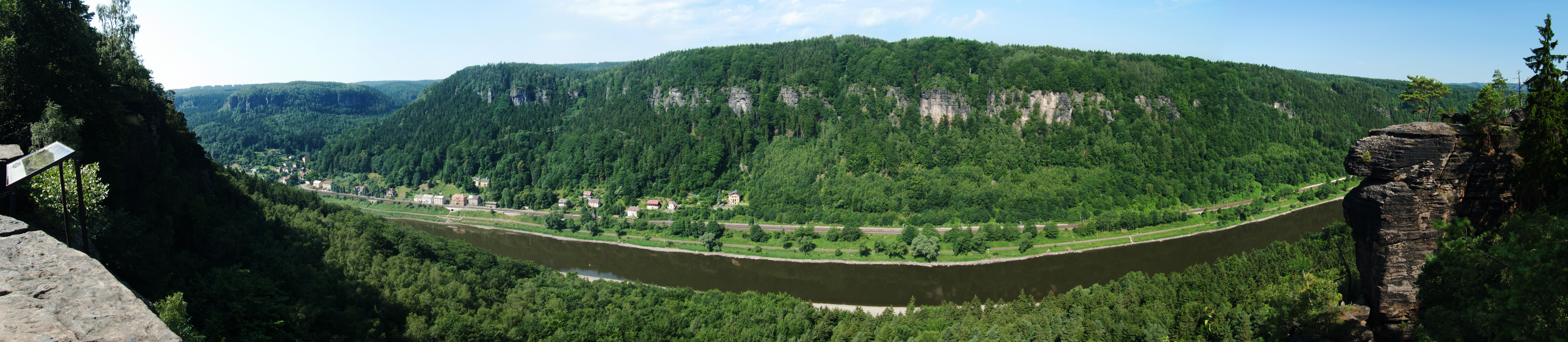
Elbe Canyon as seen from the Belvedér observation point
