= Belvedere, California =

City in California, United States

- City in California
- City of Belvedere
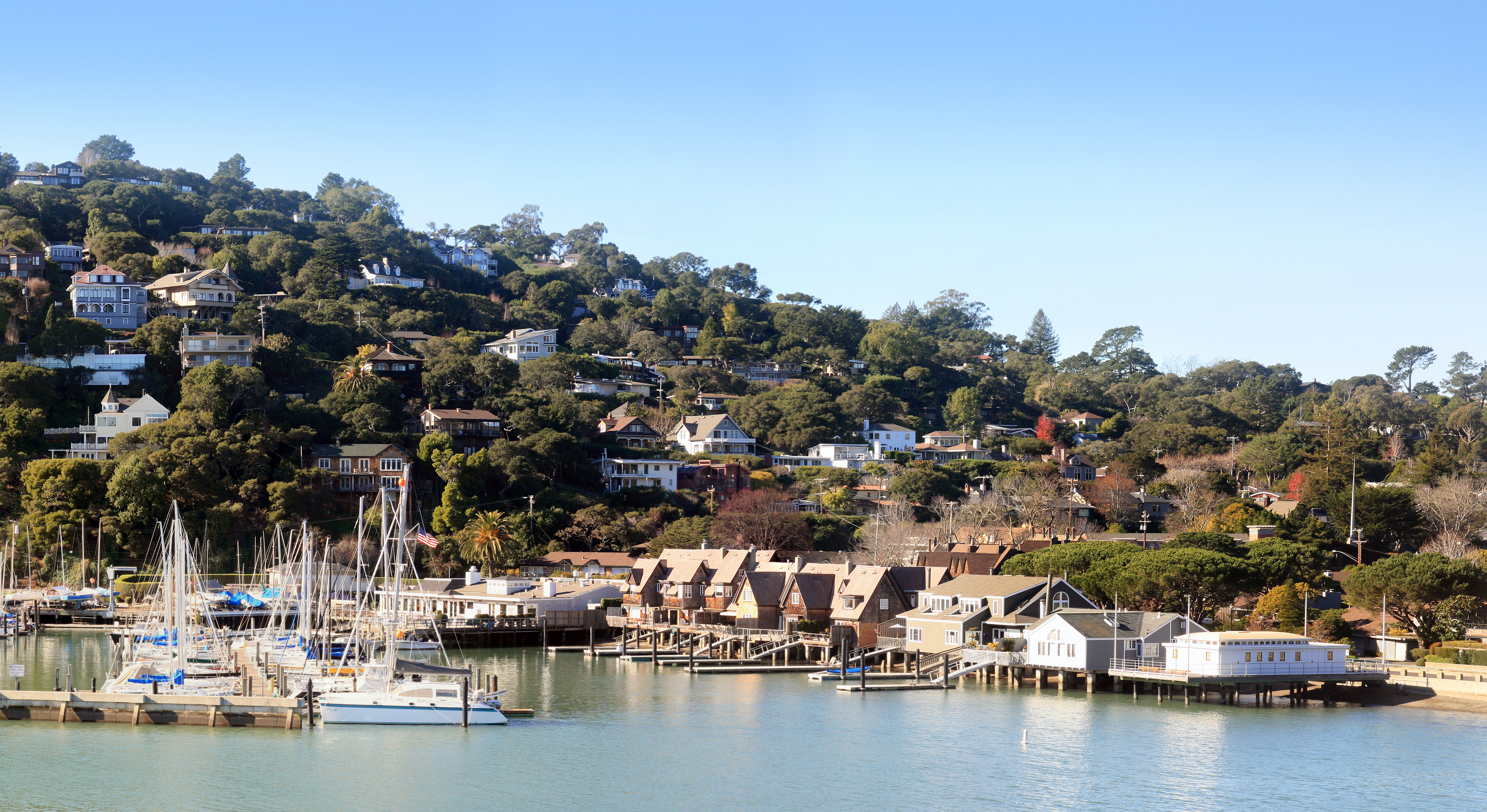
- Belvedere around San Francisco Yacht Club

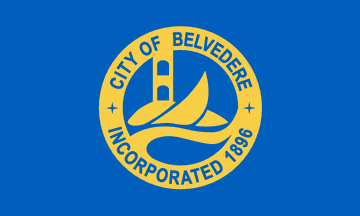
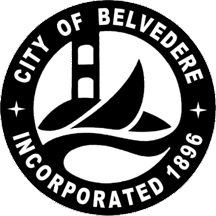
- Flag Seal
- Interactive map of Belvedere, California
- Location in the United States
- Coordinates: 37°52′22″N 122°27′52″W
- Country: United States
- State: California
- County: Marin
- Incorporated: December 24, 1896

Government
  - Type: Council–manager
  - Body: City council: Sally Wilkinson (Mayor); Kevin Burke (Vice Mayor); Jane Cooper; Pat Carapiet; Peter Mark
  - County supervisor: District 3 Stephanie Moulton Peters
  - State senator: Mike McGuire (D)
  - Assemblymember: Damon Connolly (D)
  - U. S. rep.: Jared Huffman (D)

Area
  - Total: 2.41 sq mi (6.23 km^{2})
  - Land: 0.52 sq mi (1.35 km^{2})
  - Water: 1.89 sq mi (4.89 km^{2}) 78.42%
- Elevation: 36 ft (11 m)

Population (2020)
  - Total: 2,126
  - Estimate (2024): 2,080
  - Density: 4,093.4/sq mi (1,580.46/km^{2})
- Time zone: UTC-8 (Pacific)
  - Summer (DST): UTC-7 (PDT)
- ZIP code: 94920
- Area codes: 415/628
- FIPS code: 06-05164
- GNIS feature IDs: 1658031, 2409829
- Website: cityofbelvedere.gov

Belvedere is a residential incorporated city located on the San Francisco Bay in Marin County, California, United States. Consisting of two islands and a lagoon, it is connected to the Tiburon Peninsula by two causeways. At the 2020 census, the population was 2,126. The US Census Bureau's 2016–2020 American Community Survey estimated a per capita income of $161,837, in 2020 dollars. Belvedere and Tiburon share a post office and the 94920 ZIP code.

== Location ==
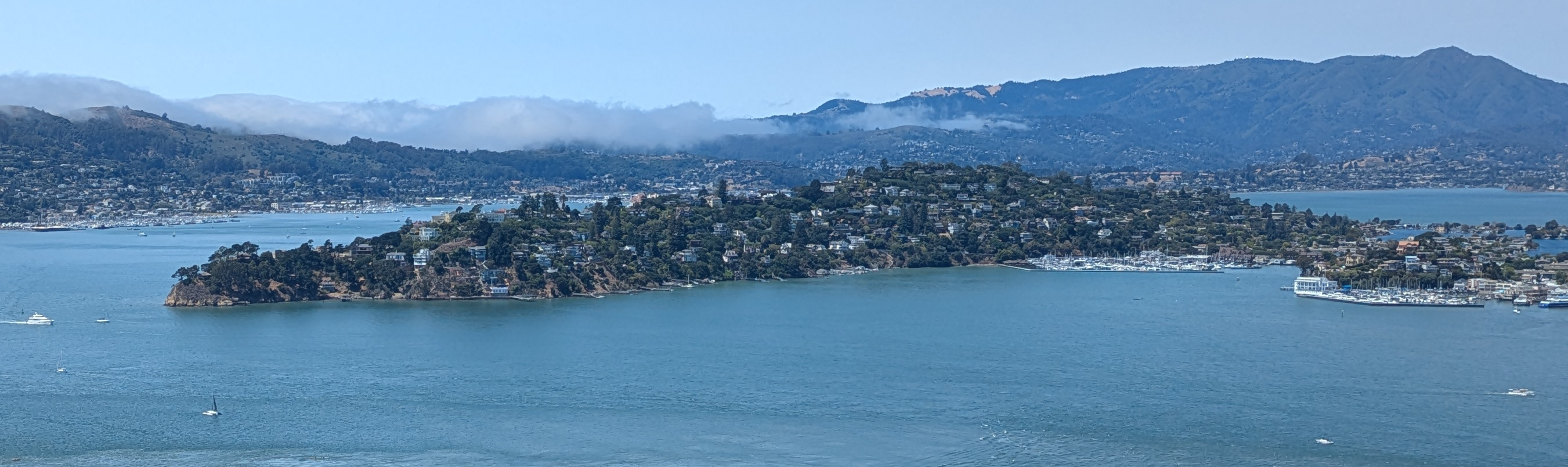
Belvedere

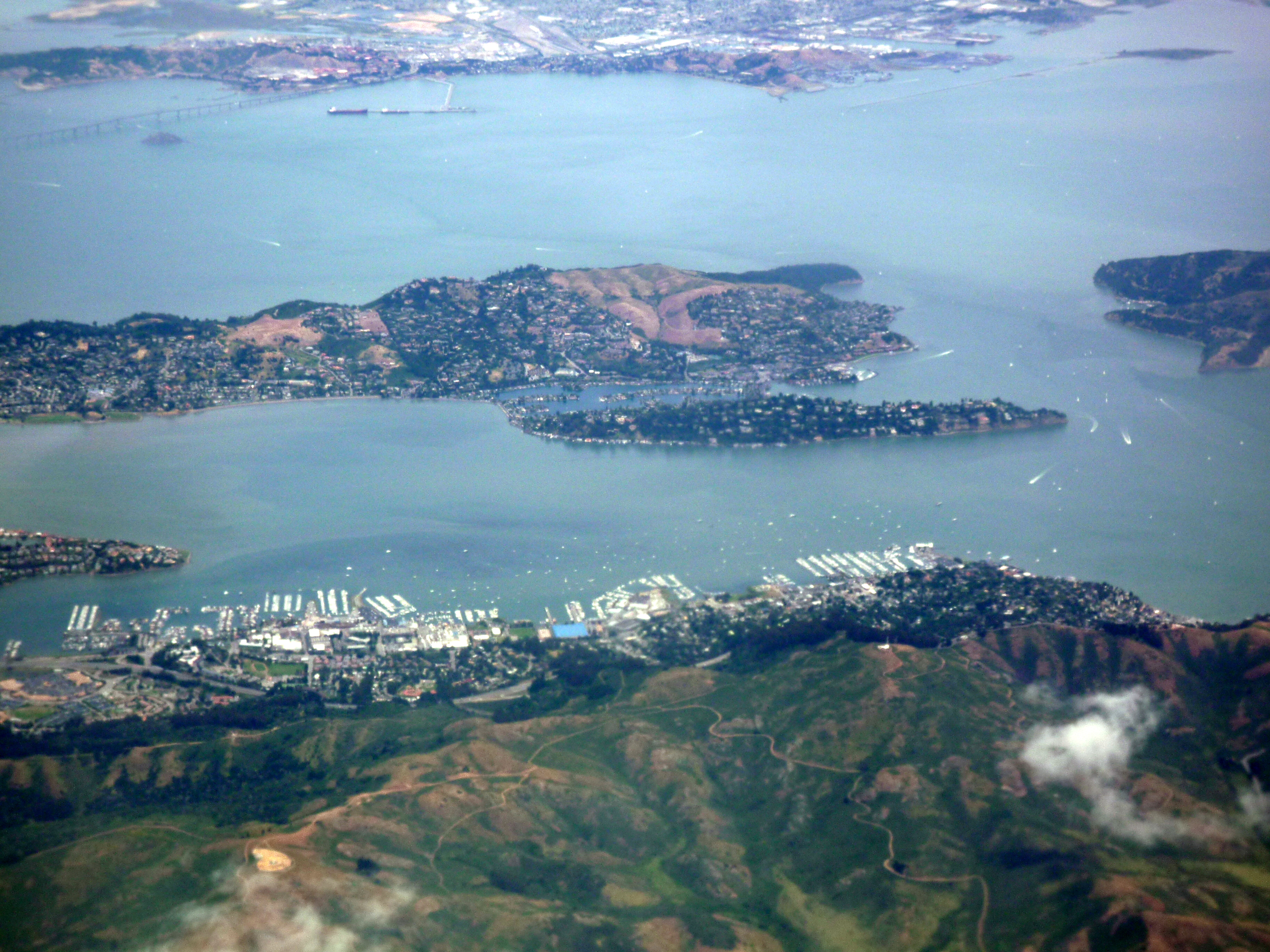
Aerial view of Belvedere and the Tiburon Peninsula

Belvedere is located at 37°52′22″N 122°27′52″W, about 4 mi (6 km) north of San Francisco.

Belvedere's two islands are Belvedere Island and Corinthian Island. Corinthian Island is shared with Tiburon.

Belvedere Lagoon is situated between the two causeways (Beach Road and San Rafael Avenue) that connect Belvedere Island to the town of Tiburon.

Belvedere has a total area of 2.41 sq mi (6.2 km^{2}), of which 0.52 sq mi (1.3 km^{2}) is land and 1.89 sq mi (4.9 km^{2}) (78%) is water.

== History ==
Belvedere incorporated as a city in 1896. Its first post office was opened in 1897. It was formerly home to a fish cannery.

Belvedere's City Hall was originally a Presbyterian Church. It was moved to its present location on San Rafael Avenue in 1949.

In 2016, Belvedere City Council approved a twin-city agreement with Portofino, Italy.

== Houses ==
Views from Belvedere include San Francisco, Angel Island, Sausalito, the Golden Gate Bridge, San Francisco Bay, Richardson Bay, and Mount Tamalpais.

Houses on Belvedere Island encompass a range of periods and architectural styles, including Shingle Style, Arts and Crafts, modern and Mediterranean designs, often on steep hillside lots. Many houses around Belvedere Lagoon were built in the 1950s and 1960s, with architect-designed mid-century modern houses prominent; most lagoon-area lots face the water. Many waterfront properties have docks, decks, boat lifts or floats.

The Valentine Rey House, designed by Willis Polk and built in 1893, is listed on the National Register of Historic Places. Notable designers of homes in Belvedere have included Joseph Esherick, Albert Farr, who designed the Belvedere Land Company building and cottages, Henry Gutterson, and Charles Warren Callister.

In March 2024, the Planning Commission approved the 40-unit Mallard Pointe redevelopment after more than three years of public debate.

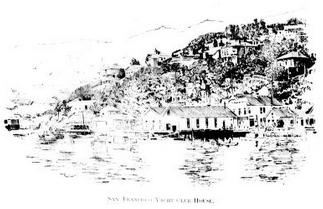
San Francisco Yacht Club House c. 1894

Belvedere is a residential community. The nearby town of Tiburon provides services, shops and eateries.

Two yacht clubs are located in Belvedere: the San Francisco Yacht Club and the Corinthian Yacht Club.

== Demographics ==
Historical population
Census	Pop.	Note	%±
1900	434		—
1910	481		10.8%
1920	616		28.1%
1930	500		−18.8%
1940	457		−8.6%
1950	800		75.1%
1960	2,148		168.5%
1970	2,599		21.0%
1980	2,401		−7.6%
1990	2,147		−10.6%
2000	2,125		−1.0%
2010	2,068		−2.7%
2020	2,126		2.8%
2024 (est.)	2,080		−2.2%
U.S. Decennial Census; 1900 1910 1920; 1930 1940 1950; 1960 1970 1980; 1990 2000 2010; 2020

=== 2020 census ===
As of the 2020 census, Belvedere had a population of 2,126. The population density was 4,096.3 inhabitants per square mile (1,581.6/km^{2}). The median age was 52.9 years. 21.5% of residents were under the age of 18, 4.9% were aged 18 to 24, 11.2% were aged 25 to 44, 28.8% were aged 45 to 64, and 33.6% were 65 years of age or older. For every 100 females there were 85.4 males, and for every 100 females age 18 and over there were 82.6 males age 18 and over.

100.0% of residents lived in urban areas, while 0.0% lived in rural areas. The whole population lived in households.

There were 898 households in Belvedere, of which 30.8% had children under the age of 18 living in them. Of all households, 58.8% were married-couple households, 3.5% were cohabiting couple households, 11.7% were households with a male householder and no spouse or partner present, and 26.1% were households with a female householder and no spouse or partner present. About 27.4% of all households were made up of individuals and 19.7% had someone living alone who was 65 years of age or older. The average household size was 2.37, and there were 622 families (69.3% of all households).

There were 1,060 housing units at an average density of 2,042.4 units per square mile (788.6 units/km^{2}), of which 898 (84.7%) were occupied. Of occupied units, 71.8% were owner-occupied and 28.2% were occupied by renters. Overall, 15.3% of housing units were vacant. The homeowner vacancy rate was 1.4% and the rental vacancy rate was 4.5%.

Racial composition as of the 2020 census
Race	Number	Percent
White	1,858	87.4%
Black or African American	20	0.9%
American Indian and Alaska Native	7	0.3%
Asian	71	3.3%
Native Hawaiian and Other Pacific Islander	0	0.0%
Some other race	22	1.0%
Two or more races	148	7.0%
Hispanic or Latino (of any race)	109	5.1%

=== Income and poverty ===
According to the US Census Bureau's 2016–2020 American Community Survey five-year estimates, the median household income was $247,768 and the per capita income was $161,837, both in 2020 inflation-adjusted dollars. About 4.8% of families and 5.6% of the population were below the poverty line.

== Politics ==
As of January 2, 2018, Belvedere had 1,425 registered voters. Of these, 587 (41.2%) were registered as Democrats, while 416 (29.2%) were registered as Republicans. 371 (26.0%) declined to state. 51 were registered with other parties.

== Twin city ==
- Portofino, Liguria, Italy

== Education ==
Belvedere is in Reed Union School District and the Tamalpais Union High School District.

== Notable people ==
- Les Crane (1933–2008), radio announcer and television talk show host.
- Mike Machette (born 1951), tennis player.

== See also ==
- List of people from Marin County, California
