= Jewish Community High School of the Bay =

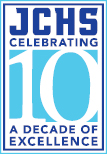

Location
- 1835 Ellis Street; San Francisco, California; United States; 37°46′53″N 122°26′12″W

Information
- Type: Private
- Established: 2001
- Head of School: Howard Ruben
- Faculty: 36
- Enrollment: 184
- Mascot: Wolves
- Newspaper: The Observer
- Yearbook: JCHS of the Bay Yearbook
- Website: http://www.jchsofthebay.org

The Jewish Community High School of the Bay (commonly known as JCHS) is a coeducational, college preparatory high school located in the Western Addition neighborhood of San Francisco, California. Founded in 2001, JCHS is a pluralistic Jewish high school.

== History ==
=== Founding ===
The idea for a pluralistic Jewish high school serving the Bay Area was initially conceptualized by Nancy Zimmerman Pechner, a local artist, in 1997. Zimmerman partnered with Noah's Bagels-founder Noah Alper, who would become JCHS's first board president, to open the school in the fall of 2001.

Tom Lorch was the original head of school, before turning the reins over to Larry Fischer. Fischer, who served as principal of a Connecticut high school of 19 years, resigned after the end of the school's first year. Rabbi Edward Harwitz, the school's principal, was promoted to fill Fischer's position. Rabbi Harwitz, then 37, had been the director of student affairs for Milken Community High School in Los Angeles, California. Harwitz also served as the Head of the Judaic Studies Department and was the School's first rabbi. Harwitz abruptly resigned in February 2005, citing personal reasons. Harwitz was replaced by Rabbi Sheldon Dorph, who served in an interim capacity until Rabbi Howard Ruben was hired in 2007.

Ruben came to JCHS from Anshe Chesed Fairmount Temple in Cleveland, Ohio. The Reform rabbi served in Cleveland for nine years but was originally from the Bay Area. In the past Ruben, who was originally an attorney before being ordained, had worked as the director of the Cincinnati Bureau of Jewish Education and served on the board of various Jewish organizations in San Francisco.

JCHS opened for its inaugural school year in September 2001 in an old pre-school on the campus of Congregation Kol Shofar in Tiburon, California. The school had a three-year lease on the property, and the temporary campus could accommodate 100 students.

=== Campus ===
In the summer of 2001, the New York-based Keren Keshet Foundation spent $20 million to purchase the campus of the California College of Podiatric Medicine, located in the Western Addition Neighborhood of San Francisco. The campus included a multi-wing hospital, a classroom building and a parking garage, all built between the 1920s and 1970s.

Under an agreement with Keren Keshet, the foundation agreed to turn the deed for the property over to the high school if they were able to raise $20 million of their own, or raise enrollment to 400 students.

In the fall of 2002, JCHS moved into the college's 62,000-square-foot, two-story classroom building which was built in 1974. The Jewish Community Library opened its new location on the new JCHS campus in 2003 and JCHS' award-winning lunch program opened in 2004. The first senior class graduated in the spring of 2005.

== School information ==
=== Academics ===
The JCHS curriculum includes three areas of focus: math/science, humanities/arts, and Jewish studies/Hebrew. Classes challenge students to develop their own ideas and questions while seeking to understand those of others, and to learn clear and concise writing, effective public speaking, logic, creative expression, and critical thinking. JCHS offers over 70 classes and includes a strong advanced placement program. Students also have the opportunity to design their own coursework through independent study.

=== Faculty ===
JCHS' faculty includes 36 full-time staff members as well as a 5:1 student to teacher ratio. Class sizes are an average of 12 students. JCHS has the highest student to teacher ratio of any independent high school in the San Francisco Bay Area. The JCHS faculty holds 28 master's degrees, 9 PhDs or terminal academic degrees and includes 3 Rabbis. Many faculty also serve as club advisers or coaches of sports teams.

=== Student body ===
For the 2017-18 school year, 30% of JCHS students attended public middle schools, 16% attended private schools and 53% came from Jewish day schools. San Francisco residents accounted for 47% of student body, 30% came from the East Bay, 18% from the North Bay and 5% from the North Peninsula.

=== Arts ===
JCHS offers courses including Studio Art, Sculpture, Photography, AP Art History, Filmmaking, Music Ensemble and Vocal Ensemble.

The JCHS Drama program was invited to perform at the 2011 and 2017 Edinburgh Fringe Festivals. Students from play writing and screenwriting classes have had their work published and performed by prestigious journals and theater companies JCHS also hosts the Jewish Community Youth Orchestra and Chorale (JCYO).

=== Athletics ===
JCHS offers the following interscholastic sports: girls and boys soccer, volleyball, basketball, rock climbing, baseball, cross country, swimming, and tennis. Club teams include golf, Hip-Hop, and Ultimate Frisbee. 75% of the student body participates on an athletic team. JCHS varsity teams are part of the Bay Counties League-Central (BCL-Central) and California's North Coast Section (NCS). Other member schools in BCL-Central are Drew School, Gateway High School, Pescadero High School, San Domenico School, San Francisco Waldorf School, and The Bay School of San Francisco.

In the 2011 MLB Draft, the San Francisco Giants drafted JCHS senior Benjamin Sosnick in the 49th round (1,497th overall).

Following their historic 13-5-3 season in 2023, the boys' varsity soccer team won their first-ever NCS championship. In their last two seasons, the boy's varsity soccer team also made it two consecutive BCL League Championship Finals in 2022, and 2023, and a D2 NCS Conference Championship in 2022. The Boys squad also made team history in 2021 by upsetting Bentley in their first D2 NCS playoff game.

=== Student support ===
Each grade level has an appointed faculty member who serves as the Class Dean. JCHS also offers the services of our School Counselor, Educational Support Director and College Advisor.

=== Technology ===
PC desktop workstations are available in the library for student research. A laptop computer program was launched in August 2010, mandating that all students bring a laptop from home or use one the school provides. The laptop program was launched at the same time the school began implementation of Moodle, online course management software.

The technology program was initially plagued by student complaints, including issues with internet speed and an incident in which the Moodle program crashed. In Spring 2012, the school announced they would begin blocking Facebook on the school internet network to halt classroom distractions and increase internet speeds.

=== Lunch ===
JCHS' lunch program opened in 2004. The program began under the auspice of food services director Jesse Buckner-Alper, son of Noah Alper the founder of Noah's Bagels. Stu Jacobs took over the program in 2007, and the program won multiple awards during his tenure. In 2009 the JCHS lunch program was awarded the Golden Carrot award, given by Physicians Committee for Responsible Medicine. The award was established in 2004 to recognize food service professionals working to promote healthier school lunches. In 2010 the program earned the school a place among the top five "Veg-Friendly Cafeterias" in the country, according to PETA2, the youth-outreach arm of the animal rights PETA organization.

== Grade Journeys ==
Students participate in Journeys designed to enhance education through real-world experiences. Journeys are staffed by JCHS faculty and administration.

During the 2008/09 school year, experiential journeys included 9th grade Journey: "Making our Machaneh – Creating our Camp” (Brandeis Bardin Institute, CA), 10th grade Journey to the Southwest (Hualapai Reservation and Grand Canyon in AZ and Las Vegas, NV), 11th grade Pilgrimage of Civil Rights & Rock n’Roll (Atlanta, GA; Birmingham, AL; Tupelo, MS; and Memphis, TN) and 12th grade Journey to New York (New York Metropolitan Area).

During the 2017-18 school year, the 9th grade again traveled to the Brandeis Bardin Institute in southern California. The 10th grade traveled to Utah's Bryce Canyon National Park and Zion National Park, as well as a short visit to Las Vegas. The 11th and 12th grades went to Israel for a longer, two week trip (the standard length of a Journey is one week).

During the 2017-18 school year, the 9th grade continued the tradition of going to southern California. The 10th grade again traveled to Utah and Las Vegas. The 11th grade went to Israel for the same two-week length as the previous year. The 12th grade went on a service/learning trip to New Orleans.

== Community outreach ==
Students volunteered more than 4,000 hours each year. Students have collected 1092 lbs. of food for the SF Food Bank; interviewed Holocaust Survivors for JFCS's Next Chapter project; served hundreds meals at Glide Memorial Church; helped seniors at adult day care programs; and worked with The Village Project tutoring local kids from Western Addition in reading, writing, social studies, and math every Monday and Thursday from September, 2009 through May, 2010, totaling over 250 hours.

== Accreditation ==
JCHS received a full 6-year term of accreditation from the Western Association of Schools and Colleges (WASC) in the spring of 2007. The school was re-accredited in 2015 for the full term.

== Professional affiliations ==
JCHS staff and faculty are members of the following professional organizations: National Association of Independent Schools (NAIS), California Association of Independent Schools (CAIS), Partnership for Excellence in Jewish Education (PEJE), the Alliance for Jewish Education, the College Board, Secondary School Admission Test Board (SSAT), Bay Area Admissions Directors (BAAD), the National Association for College Admission Counseling (NACAC), the Western Association for College Admission Counseling (WACAC), the American Association of Collegiate Registrars and Admissions Officers (AACRAO), RAVSAK - the Jewish Community Day School Network and the Bay Area Independent Schools College Counselors (BAISCC) Consortium.
