= JCHS =

JCHS may refer to:

- Jefferson College of Health Sciences, Roanoke, Virginia, United States
- Joint Center for Housing Studies, at Harvard University

== High schools ==
- Jackson County High School, McKee, Kentucky, United States
- James Caldwell High School, West Caldwell, New Jersey, United States
- James Campbell High School, ʻEwa Beach, Hawaii, United States
- James Clemens High School, Madison, Alabama, United States
- James Cook High School, Auckland, New Zealand
- Jasper County High School (Georgia), Monticello, Georgia, United States
- Jay County High School, Portland Indiana, United States
- Jefferson City High School, Jefferson City, Missouri, United States
- Jefferson County High School (Georgia), Louisville, Georgia, United States
- Jenkins County High School, Millen, Georgia, United States
- Jersey Community High School, Jerseyville, Illinois, United States
- Jesse C. Carson High School, China Grove, North Carolina, United States
- Jewish Community High School of the Bay, San Francisco, California, United States
- Johns Creek High School, Johns Creek, Georgia, United States
- John Champe High School, Aldie, Virginia, United States
- Johnson Central High School, Paintsville, Kentucky, United States
- Junction City High School (Arkansas), Junction City, Arkansas, United States
- Junction City High School (Kansas), Junction City, Kansas, United States
- Junction City High School (Oregon), Junction City, Oregon, United States
