= Call of the Shofar (disambiguation) =

Call of the Shofar is a Jewish self-help and self-awareness organization.

Call of the Shofar or Kol Shofar may also refer to:

- The Call of the Shofar and Other Stories, a children's storybook by Dr. Nissan Mindel
- Congregation Kol Shofar, a Conservative congregation in Belvedere, California

== See also ==
- Shofar blowing
