= Lyford's Stone Tower =

Historic building in California, United States

- U.S. National Register of Historic Places
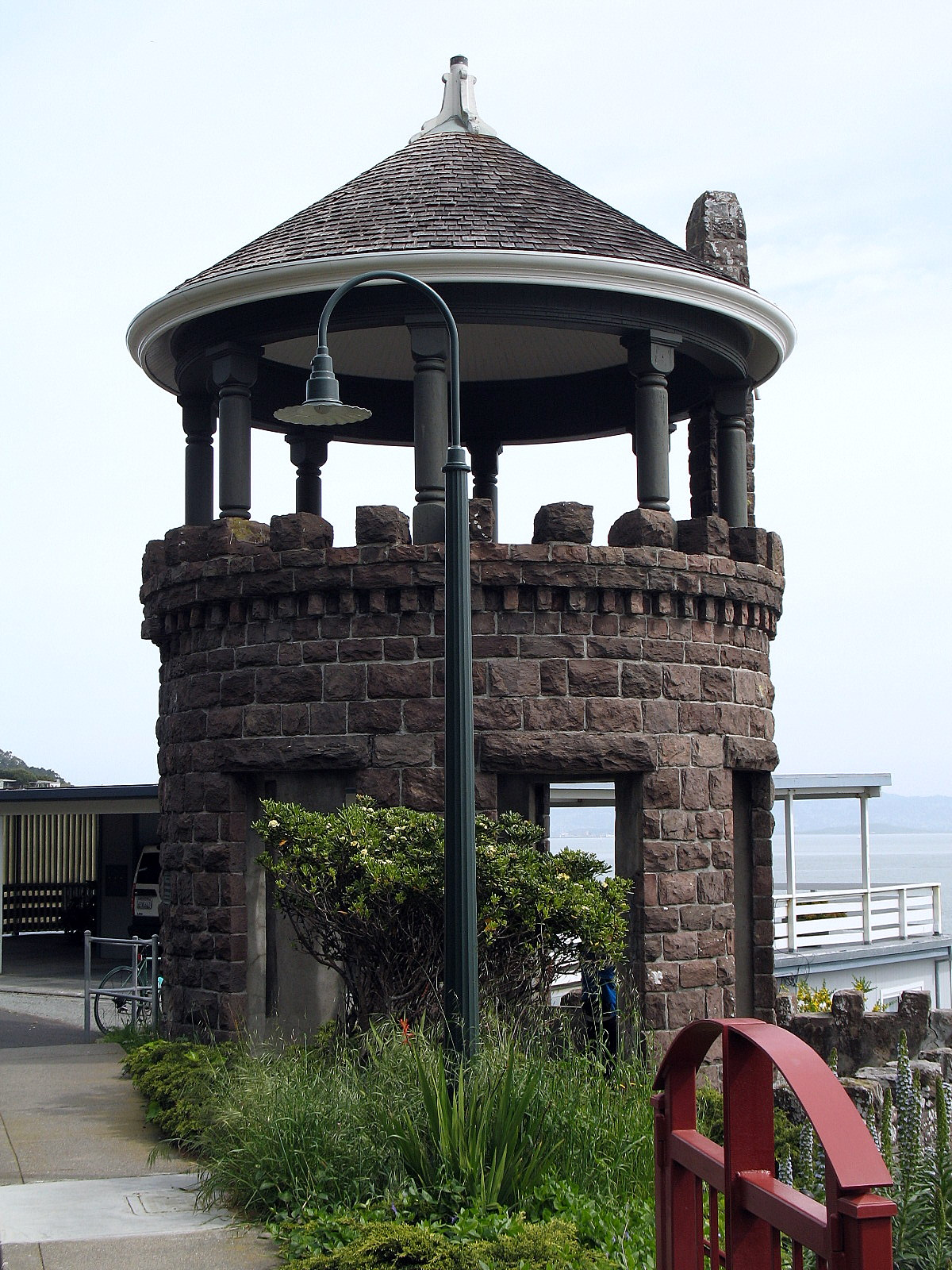

- Location within San Francisco Bay Area Location within California Location within the United States
- Location: 2034 Paradise Dr., Tiburon, California, US
- Coordinates: 37°52′25″N 122°26′53″W
- Area: 0.1 acres (0.040 ha)
- Built: 1889
- Architect: Gustav A. Behrnd
- Architectural style: Romanesque
- NRHP reference No.: 76000497
- Added to NRHP: December 2, 1976

Lyford's Stone Tower is a stone tower in Tiburon, California, United States, on a peninsula overlooking San Francisco Bay. The tower was designed by Gustav A. Behrnd in the Romanesque style and rises two stories. Constructed in 1889, it was part of an ultimately unbuilt estate that local doctor Benjamin Lyford wanted to build on the peninsula. It was listed on the National Register of Historic Places in 1976.

== Description ==
Lyford's Stone Tower is a circular structure at 2034 Paradise Drive, overlooking San Francisco Bay in Tiburon, California, United States. It sits on a rocky outcrop along a curve on Paradise Drive, a road facing the waterfront. Designed by Gustav A. Behrnd, the tower is designed in the Romanesque style and rises two stories. The lower story is made of ashlar sandstone and originally had two doors and four double hung windows. There is a crenellation 14 1/4 feet (4.3 m) above ground, which forms a railing on the upper story. Above the crenellation, a series of wooden pillars support a low conical roof, whose pinnacle is 12 feet (3.7 m) above the crenellation. The tower has a total diameter of 15 10/12 feet (4.8 m).

The lower story was originally used as an office. The interior fittings are no longer extant, and the staircase to the upper level has been removed. Only a fireplace remains on the upper stories. The tower originally formed the abutment of a sandstone arch, which crossed over an adjacent roadway, connecting with another tower on a neighboring hill. This arch measured 14 2/3 feet (4.5 m) long and peaked at 13 feet (4.0 m) above the road. The arch and the other tower were removed when the adjacent road was widened.

== History ==
The tower is named for local doctor Benjamin Lyford, who had wanted to build an estate on a peninsula jutting out into the San Francisco Bay. His wife, Hilarita Reed, had inherited up to 9,000 acres (3,600 ha) on the site from her father John Reed, who had owned part of the Rancho Corte Madera del Presidio, a Mexican-era land grant. The site was located near a railroad that originated at nearby Sausalito. In 1883, Lyford commissioned a survey of the Reed estate for the construction of what he called Lyford's Hygeia, named after Hygieia, the ancient Greek goddess of health. On this site, he planned to construct a resort where people could reside "free of fogs and malaria". The development was supposed to include technological advances such as a sewage system and separate toilets.

Lyford's Tower was built in 1889. The tower, denoting the resort's main entrance, sat 300 yards (270 m) from a railroad station and ferry terminal. It contained an office for Lyford and was part of a wall surrounding Lyford's Hygeia. An arch spanned a private roadway, which became a public road called Tiburon Boulevard and then Paradise Drive. Despite Lyford's promise that Lyford's Hygeia would provide freedom from "elements which retard growth and ultimately destroy life", Lyford imposed so many restrictions on prospective property owners that the community was never built as he had planned. Instead, the surrounding area of Tiburon was developed with nondescript cottages. Lyford's name remained in the tower and a nearby cove.

Lyford gave Behrnd his house nearby in 1901, possibly as payment for the architect's work on the tower; Lyford died in 1906. In successive years, the tower was alternatively known as the Lyford Tower, Lyford's (Stone) Tower, the Stone Lodge, and the Castle. The arch linking to Lyford's Tower was demolished in May 1926 when Tiburon Boulevard was widened to 22 feet (6.7 m). By the 1950s, the San Francisco Chronicle wrote that "for many years it has had a 'For Sale' sign on it", and that "irreverent neighbors" had proposed using it as a hotdog stand. The site was acquired by Orazio G. Rosolia in 1958. In 1961, he proposed developing three duplex houses at and around the tower's site, prompting objections from Tiburon residents. In exchange for not developing the tower's site for 25 years, the owner received permission to develop two triplex houses on the adjacent site.

The next owner, dentist A. L. Caceres, bought the site in 1964 and told Tiburon town officials in 1973 that he would restore the tower. The tower was named a municipal landmark by the Tiburon City Council in 1974, despite concerns from Caceres, who worried that he would not be able to develop the lot. The tower was listed on the National Register of Historic Places in 1976. By that decade, there were three large cracks in the wall, and the upper floor had rotted through, requiring its removal. The tower was restored in 1980 after a fundraising effort raised $8,000 from 400 people. Caceres deeded the land around the tower to the town of Tiburon and continued to own the tower itself. A plaque commemorating preservationists Gene Marans and Louise Teather was added to the tower in 2000. The tower was open to the public by the 21st century, though it did not have any parking. As of 2018, it was still owned by the Caceres family.

== See also ==
- National Register of Historic Places listings in Marin County, California
