= Benjamin and Hilarita Lyford House =

Historic house in California, United States

- Lyford House
- U.S. National Register of Historic Places
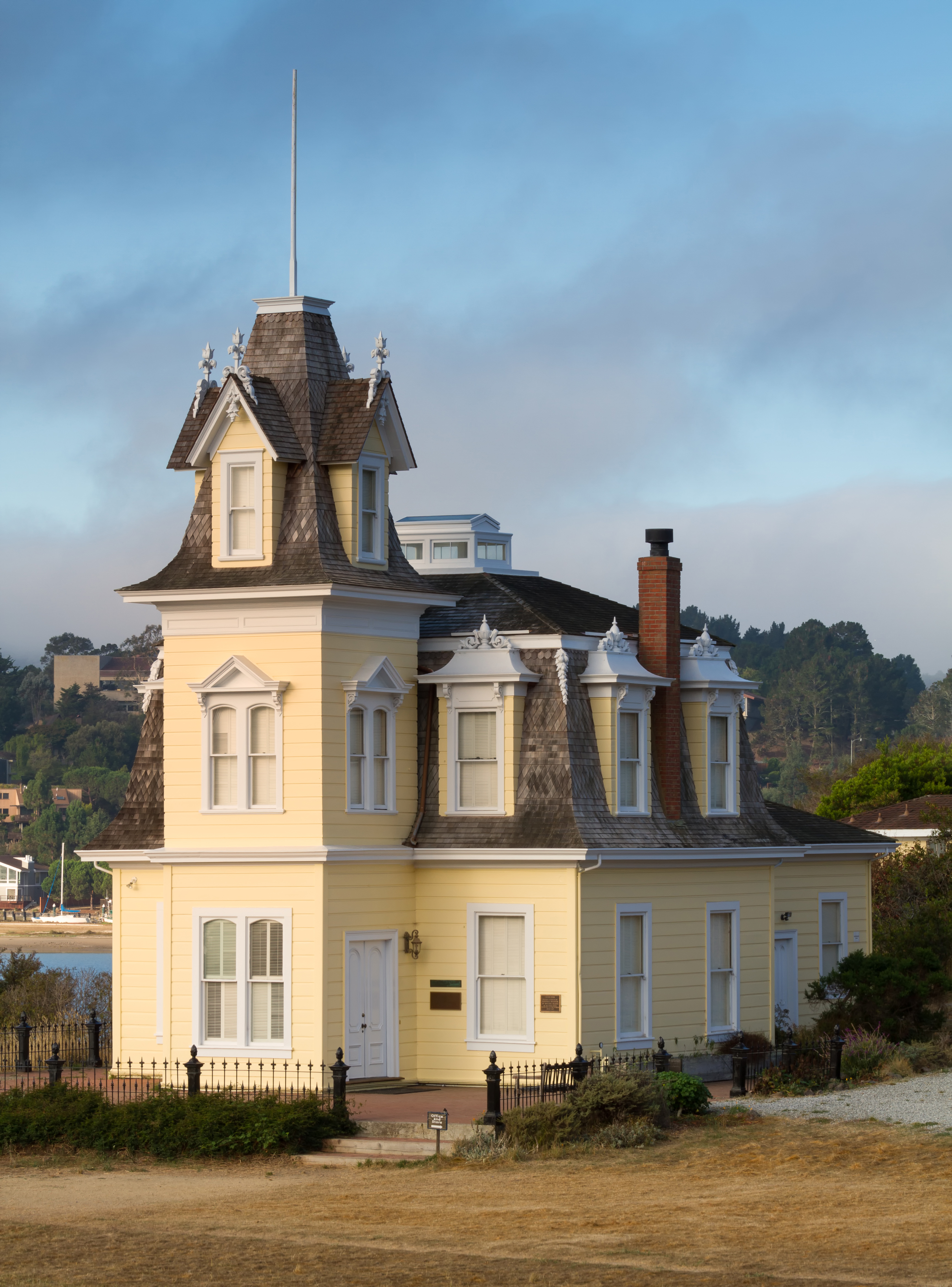

- Location within San Francisco Bay Area Location within California Location within the United States
- Location: 376 Greenwood Beach Road; Tiburon, California
- Coordinates: 37°53′39″N 122°29′46″W
- Built: 1876
- Architectural style: Victorian
- NRHP reference No.: 00001268
- Added to NRHP: November 10, 2000

The Lyford House is a Victorian house located in Tiburon, California. Built in 1876, the house is listed on the National Register of Historic Places.

== Prehistory ==
The earliest human habitation of the local area was by hunter-gatherer Native American peoples. The clearest extant record of such habitation in the vicinity is on the nearby Ring Mountain, where rock art and grinding stones are found on some of the large boulders.

== History ==
The Lyford House on Richardson Bay in Tiburon, California, was the home of Benjamin Lyford (1841–1906), a doctor in the Union Army who was born in New Hampshire and raised in Cabot, Vermont. He migrated to San Francisco after the American Civil War to practice medicine. He married Hilarita née Reed (1839–1908), the daughter of John Reed, an Irish immigrant who was granted the Rancho Corte Madera del Presidio, literally "the place where wood is cut for the Presidio", which today comprises the peninsula incorporating Tiburon, Belvedere and much of southern Marin County. The Lyford House was originally located at Strawberry Point as part of Lyford's Eagle Dairy Ranch. It was moved by barge in December 1957 when threatened with demolition and is now owned by the National Audubon Society. The new home's location was on eleven acres belonging to Rose Verrall, who'd lived there for decades and eventually donated the land and property that would become the Richardson Bay Audubon Center and Sanctuary.

The Benjamin Lyford House was added to the National Register of Historic Places in 2000. In December 2002 the house was damaged when a tree crashed through the roof. It was closed for a year of restoration, reopening in 2004.

== See also ==
- National Register of Historic Places listings in Marin County, California
- Lyford's Stone Tower, also built by Lyford
