= The Ark (newspaper) =

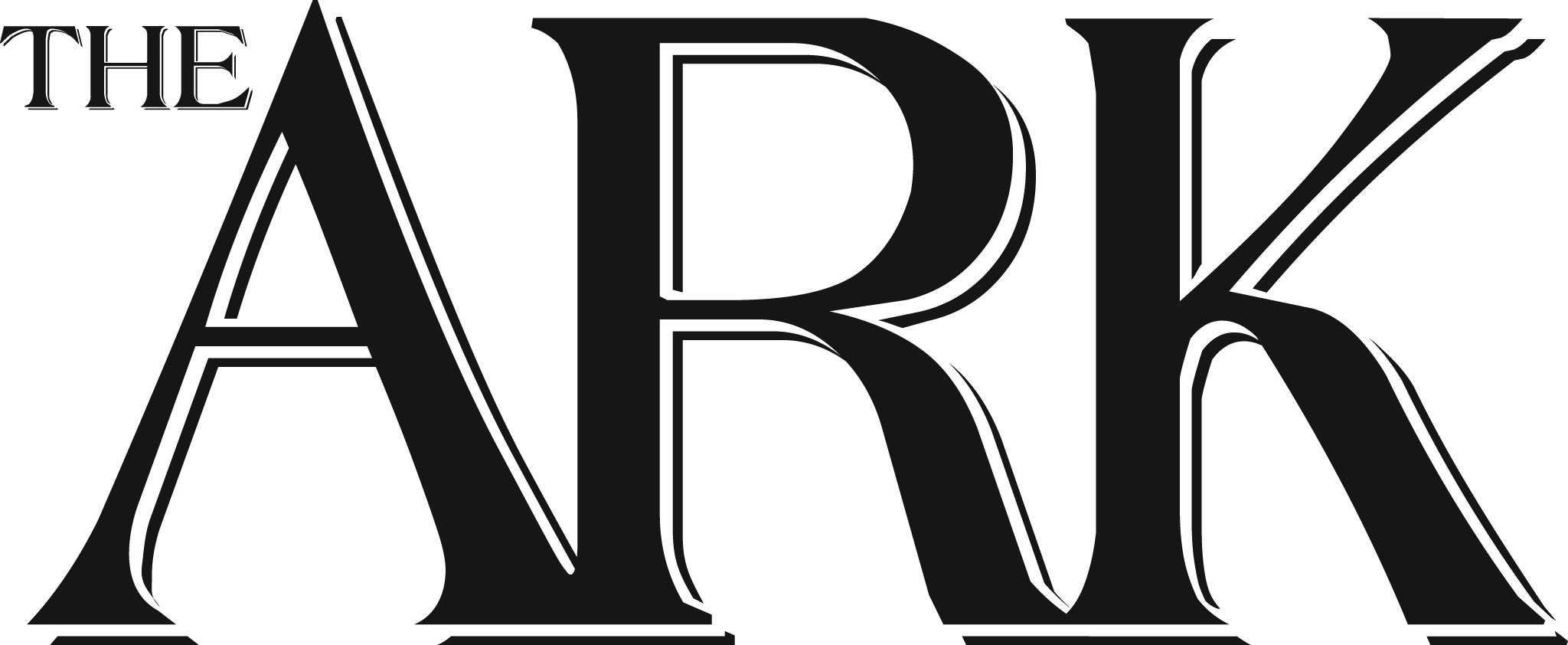

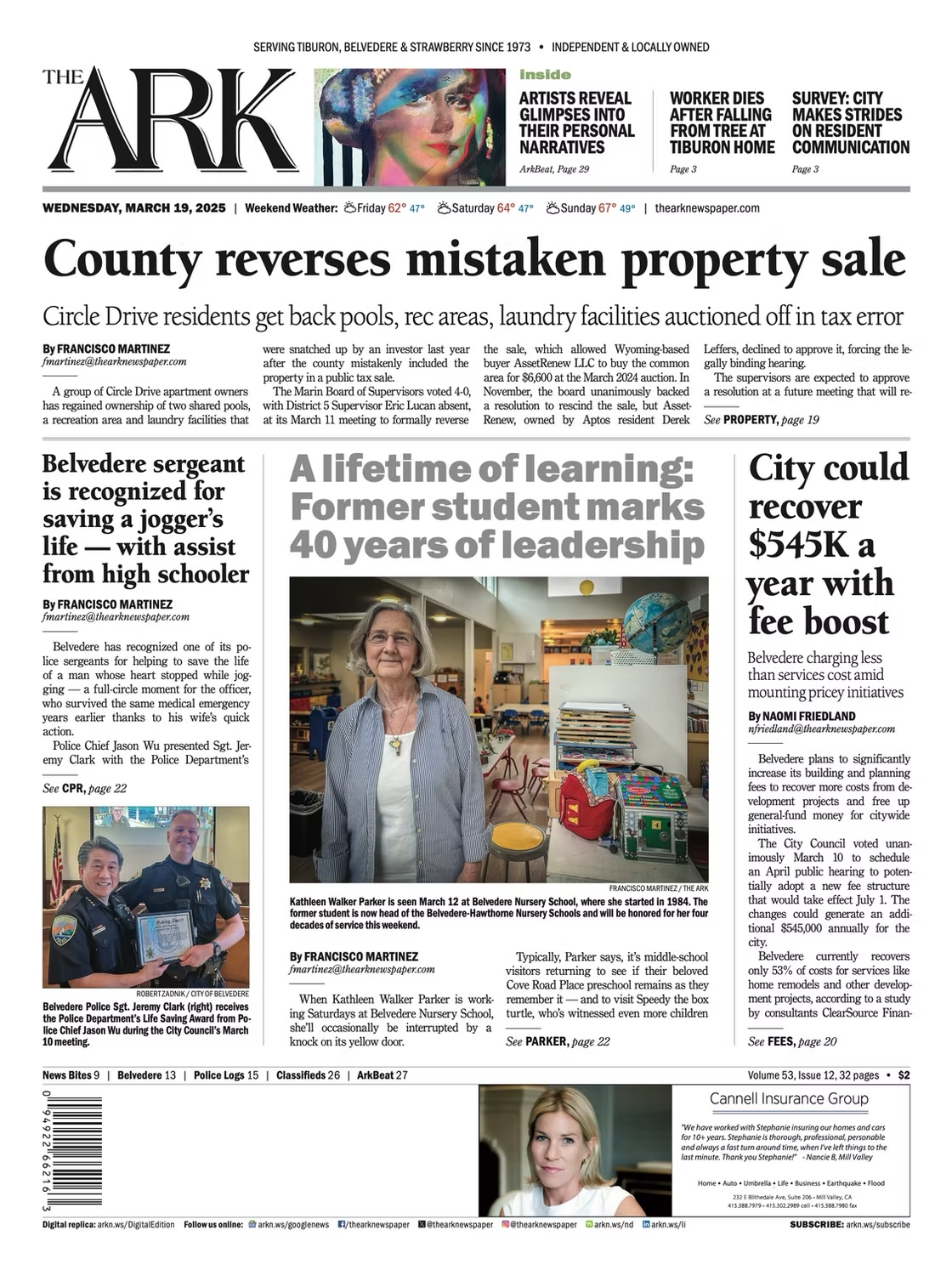
- Type: Weekly newspaper
- Format: Tabloid
- Owner(s): AMMI Publishing Co. Inc. (Henriette Corn and Kevin Hessel)
- Publisher: Henriette Corn
- Editor: Kevin Hessel
- Founded: 1972 (first trial editions); January 10, 1973 (first regular edition)
- Language: English
- Headquarters: 1550 Tiburon Blvd. Ste. D Tiburon, CA 94920
- Circulation: Under 3,000 (print); 6,000+ readership (including pass-along readers)
- Price: $2.00 (newsstand) $93.60 (1-year subscription) $176.80 (2-year subscription)
- ISSN: 2833-5341 (print); 2833-5384 (web)
- Website: www.thearknewspaper.com

The Ark is a weekly newspaper serving Tiburon, Belvedere, and Strawberry, California. Founded in 1972, with its first regular weekly edition published on January 10, 1973, The Ark is an independent, locally owned subscription newspaper. It has been recognized both nationally and regionally for its journalism, winning the National Newspaper Association's General Excellence award in 2018, 2019 and 2026 for publications with circulation under 3,000, and the California News Publishers Association's General Excellence award in 2019.

== History ==
=== Founding ===
The Ark was founded in 1972 by a group of Tiburon Peninsula residents. According to the newspaper's own history, the founding came about when the local newspaper at the time, the Ebb Tide, refused to publish a promotional article about a new community picnic planned for Angel Island called Ayala Day. While preparing for the event at the Tiburon home of Marilyn Knight, the group decided to start their own community-focused newspaper.

The newspaper's name refers to the California houseboats that once dotted Belvedere Cove, some of which were later moved ashore as freestanding homes and businesses, particularly those on Ark Row (the nickname for upper Main Street in Tiburon).

Rich Sprague of Strawberry, who was handling publicity for Ayala Day, served as the first publisher for two trial editions published on November 15 and December 13, 1972. He also took over as editor by the time of the first regular edition on January 10, 1973.

=== Early struggles and growth ===
The newspaper struggled financially in its early years until James B. McClatchy, a Tiburon resident and member of the McClatchy newspaper family, purchased it out of bankruptcy in 1975. In 1977, McClatchy hired Brad Breithaupt as editor, publisher, and reporter, who helped make the paper profitable.

In 1979, Breithaupt hired Marilyn Olson and Barbara Gnoss as feature writers, establishing the foundation for the newspaper's future. After Breithaupt departed for the Marin Independent Journal, Olson became editor. In 1985, now known as Marilyn Kessler after marriage, she and Gnoss began sharing the editorship, with each working four months and taking four months off to allow for travel.

=== Changing ownership ===
In 1987, Kessler, Gnoss, and Steve McNamara (former owner of the Pacific Sun) purchased The Ark from McClatchy. After Gnoss became ill in 2007 and died in July 2009, Judith Wilson took over her editorial role.

In January 2010, a new ownership group was formed when George Gnoss, Barbara's husband, sold their stake in the newspaper. Arthur H. Kern and wife Alison T. Gray, as AMMI Publishing Co. Inc., and Wilson joined Kessler as owners. Under this arrangement, Kessler and Wilson shared editorial responsibilities, with Gray serving as publisher.

Kessler retired in April 2011 after more than 32 years with The Ark, and she and Wilson sold their interest to Gray and Kern. Kevin Hessel was hired as executive editor in June 2011, marking a new era for the publication. Kessler, who had remained as honorary publisher emerita, died in November 2018.

Following Arthur Kern's passing in November 2022, Alison Gray stepped away from the newspaper in June 2023. At that time, Henriette Corn and Kevin Hessel became the principals of AMMI Publishing Co. Inc. and the new owners of The Ark, with Corn elevated to publisher and Hessel continuing as executive editor.

== Content and coverage ==
The Ark focuses on local news, covering Tiburon, Belvedere, and Strawberry communities in Marin County, California.

=== Editorial focus ===
The newspaper employs beat reporters who cover specific geographic areas and topics:

- Tiburon government and community
- Belvedere government and community
- Strawberry community
- Public safety
- Youth and education
- Arts and culture
- Local business and finance
- Environment

The Ark also hosts candidate forums during local elections, partnering with organizations like the League of Women Voters of Marin to help inform the community about local political issues and candidates.

=== Staff ===
The editorial team includes:

- Kevin Hessel (Executive Editor) – Joined in June 2011 after working at the Marin Independent Journal. Hessel became co-owner in June 2023. He studied journalism at San Francisco State University, trained at the Poynter Institute, was a Knight Digital Media Center fellow at University of California, Berkeley, and guest lectures in newspaper design at San Francisco State.
- Emily Lavin (Assistant Editor and Special Sections Editor) – Covers youth and education issues
- Francisco Martinez (Reporter) – Covers Tiburon
- Tyler Callister (Reporter) – Covers Belvedere, Strawberry and public safety
- Diana Goodman (Copy Editor and Calendar Editor)

On the business side, Henriette Corn serves as Publisher and Advertising Director, managing business operations, revenue, and marketing strategies. She joined The Ark in January 2006 as advertising manager and brought over 10 years of experience in finance, human resources, sales, and customer service. Prior to joining The Ark, Corn worked for Structure Consulting Group, LLC, a global provider of information technology to the energy industry, where she was responsible for human resources, including recruiting, compensation, and benefits. She was also a Senior Associate at Crowe-Innes & Associates LLC, an executive search firm. Corn became co-owner of The Ark with Kevin Hessel in June 2023 after Alison Gray stepped away from the newspaper.

== Publication details ==
The Ark is published weekly on Wednesdays and delivered by postal mail to subscribers. It is also available at newsstands (priced at $2.00 per issue) and at The Ark's office on Tuesdays for those who want to get the news early.

With newsstand sales and accounting for multiple readers per copy (using a pass-on factor of 2.36 to account for more than one person reading each copy), The Ark reaches a paid readership of more than 6,000 people. The actual print circulation is under 3,000 copies. Annual subscription rates are $93.60 for one year and $176.80 for two years within the primary service area (ZIP codes 94920, 94941, and 94925), with slightly higher rates for other areas ($98.80 for one year and $187.20 for two years). All subscriptions include both the weekly print edition and access to the digital edition.

The newspaper is an adjudicated newspaper of general circulation, allowing it to publish legal notices for governments, businesses, and individuals. While subscription revenue is important to the newspaper, advertising revenue forms the bulk of its income. The Ark's USPS number is 0120310, and periodical postage is paid at the Belvedere-Tiburon Post Office in Tiburon, California.

== Additional services ==
=== Public notices ===
As an adjudicated newspaper of general circulation, The Ark publishes legal notices for governments, businesses, and individuals, including:

- Fictitious business name statements
- Name changes
- Probate notifications
- Other official notices required by law

The newspaper provides services for submitting these notices and delivers proof of publication (affidavits) to the courts and the notice submitters after publication.

=== Community support ===
While The Ark is not a non-profit organization and contributions are not tax-deductible, it does accept financial support from the community to help sustain its journalism. During challenging economic periods, such as the COVID-19 pandemic when advertising revenue declined, the newspaper has solicited community contributions to help maintain its operations and coverage.
