= Reed Union School District =

School district in California, United States

Address
- 277-a Karen Way Tiburon, California, 94920; United States

District information
- Type: Public
- Motto: Nurture • Teach • Inspire
- Grades: PK–8
- Established: 1887
- NCES District ID: 0632160

Students and staff
- Students: 1,205 (2020–2021)
- Teachers: 78.88 (FTE)
- Staff: 62.53 (FTE)
- Student–teacher ratio: 15.28:1

Other information
- Website: www.reedschools.org

Reed Union School District (RUSD) is a California school district located in Tiburon, California. There are three schools in the district:

The district includes Tiburon, Belvedere, and small portions of Corte Madera and Strawberry.

== Reed Primary/Elementary School ==
Reed Primary/Elementary School is located in Tiburon, California. Its principal is Mary Niesyn. Its grades are PK-2. Mascot is: Reed Raccoon. Motto is: Nurture-Teach-Inspire.

== Bel Aire Elementary School ==
Bel Aire Elementary School is also located in Tiburon, California. Its principal is John Dicosmo. Mascot is the Bel Aire Bear. Motto is: Safe-Kind-Fair. Its grades are 3–5.

== Del Mar Middle School ==
Del Mar Middle School is a middle school located in Tiburon. Its principal and vice principal are Chad Stuart and Mr. Song. Its grades are 6–8. Its mascot is the Del Mar Dragon. Its school colors are blue and yellow.
