= Tiburon, California =

Town in California, United States

- Town in California
- Town of Tiburon
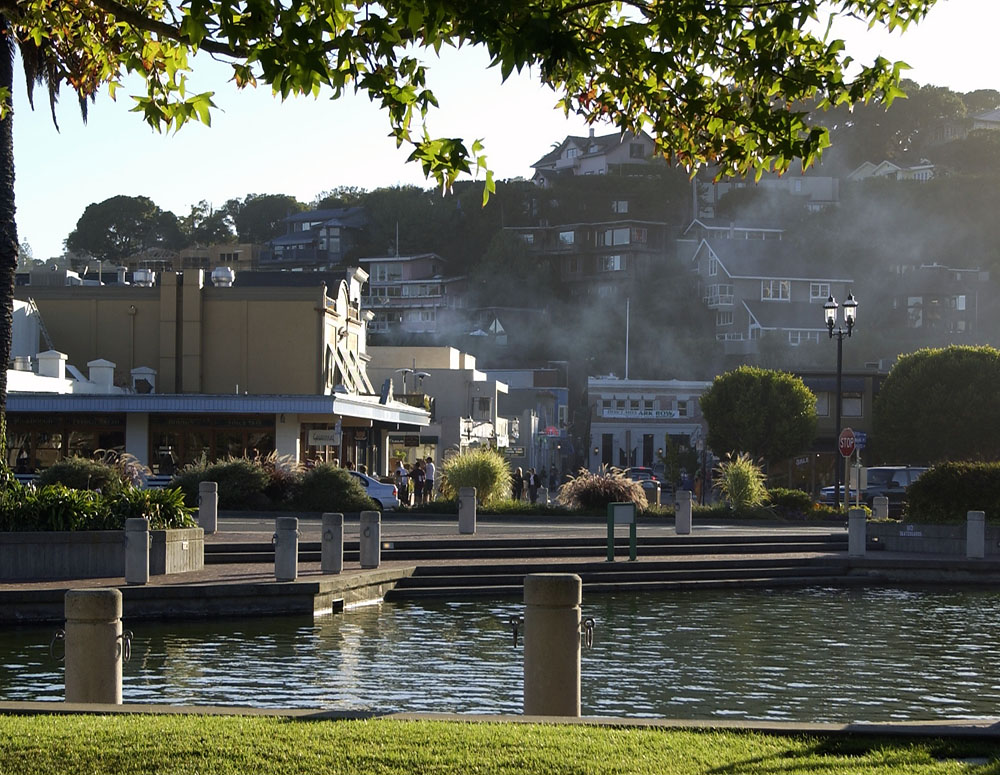
- View of Downtown Tiburon near the Ferry Docks

- Seal
- Interactive map of Tiburon, California
- Location within San Francisco Bay Area Location within California Location within the United States
- Coordinates: 37°52′25″N 122°27′24″W
- Country: United States
- State: California
- County: Marin
- Incorporated: June 23, 1964

Government
  - Supervisor: District 3 Stephanie Moulton-Peters
  - State Senator: Mike McGuire (D)
  - Assemblymember: Damon Connolly (D)
  - U.S. Rep.: Jared Huffman (D)

Area
  - Total: 13.22 sq mi (34.23 km^{2})
  - Land: 4.48 sq mi (11.60 km^{2})
  - Water: 8.74 sq mi (22.63 km^{2}) 66.10%
- Elevation: 13 ft (4 m)

Population (2020)
  - Total: 9,146
  - Estimate (2025): 8,881
  - Density: 2,041/sq mi (788.2/km^{2})
- Time zone: UTC-8 (Pacific)
  - Summer (DST): UTC-7 (PDT)
- ZIP Code: 94920
- Area codes: 415/628
- FIPS code: 06-78666
- GNIS feature IDs: 1659998, 2413389
- Website: www.townoftiburon.gov

Tiburon (/ˈtɪbərɒn/ TIB-ər-on; Spanish: Tiburón, [tiβuˈɾon]) is an incorporated town in Marin County, California, United States. It is located on the Tiburon Peninsula, which reaches south into the San Francisco Bay. It shares a ZIP code (94920) with the smaller incorporated city of Belvedere (formerly a separate island), which occupies the southwestern part of the peninsula and is contiguous with Tiburon. Tiburon is bordered by Corte Madera to the north and Mill Valley to the west, but is otherwise mostly surrounded by the bay. Besides Belvedere and Tiburon, much of the peninsula is unincorporated, including portions of the north side and the communities of Strawberry and Paradise Cay.

The population of Tiburon was 9,146 at the 2020 census and has 6,600 registered voters. Belvedere and Tiburon share a post office, library, and recreation agency.

The city's name derives from the Spanish word tiburón, which means "shark". The name was first given to the peninsula on which the city is situated, and probably inspired by the prevalence of locally native leopard sharks in the surrounding waters. Tiburon was formerly the southern terminus of the San Francisco and North Pacific Railroad (subsequently the Northwestern Pacific Railroad), which transported freight for transfer to barges for shipping to cities around San Francisco Bay. It is now a commuter and tourist town, linked by fast ferry services to San Francisco and with a concentration of restaurants and clothes shops. It is the nearest mainland point to Angel Island and a regular ferry service connects to the island.

== History ==
The earliest human habitation of the local area was by Native Americans, who have left rock carvings on Ring Mountain.

In 1884, the first post office in Tiburon opened. In 1964, Tiburon incorporated.

Much of the modern history material below is drawn from the former Town Historian, Branwell Fanning's "Brief History of Tiburon," published in the Town of Tiburon's General Plan.

=== 1775–1882 ===
Tiburón means "shark" in Spanish. He named the land Punta del Tiburón, or Shark Point. The Coast Miwok Indians had lived here for thousands of years, but there is no clear concept of what they called the peninsula.

John Reed, from Dublin, received a provisional grant for much of Southern Marin, including the Tiburon Peninsula, from the Mexican authorities in 1831, and was formally granted the Rancho Corte Madera del Presidio in 1834. Reed married Hilaria Sánchez, daughter of the commandante of the San Francisco Presidio in 1836. The Reed name is preserved on streets, subdivisions, and the local school district. Various forms of Hilaria's name, and that of her granddaughter Hilarita Reed, are found on streets, a housing development, and the Catholic Church.

Hilarita married Dr. Benjamin Lyford, who became the first land developer with his Lyford's Hygeia, now Old Tiburon. The Benjamin and Hilarita Lyford House, formerly located on their dairy farm on Strawberry Point, is now a feature of the Audubon Society's Western Headquarters and Sanctuary on Greenwood Beach Road.

=== Industrial era ===
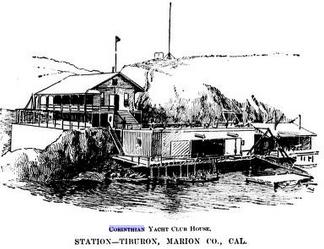
Corinthian Yacht Club House c. 1894 in Tiburon

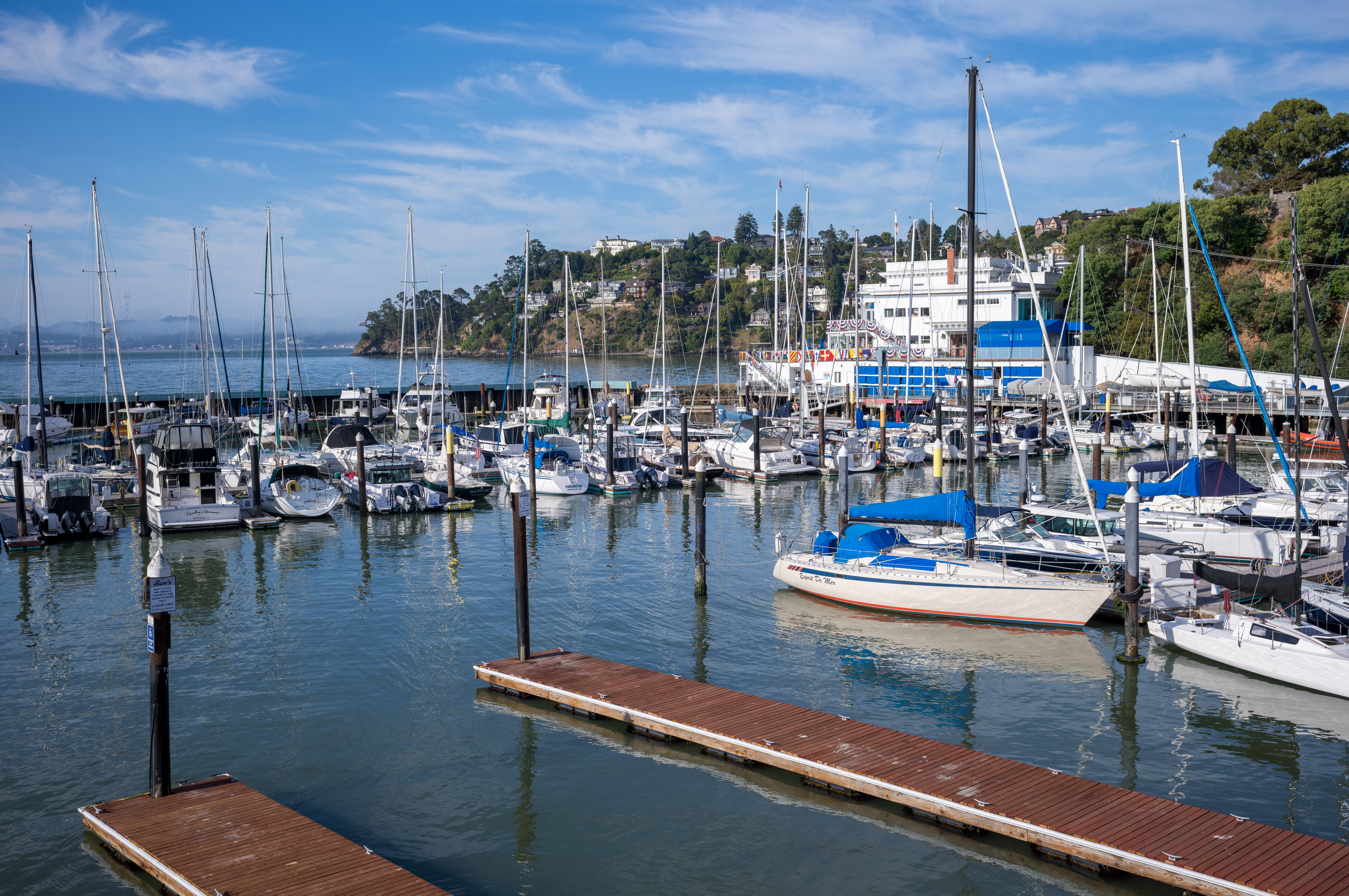
Corinthian Yacht Club in July 2023

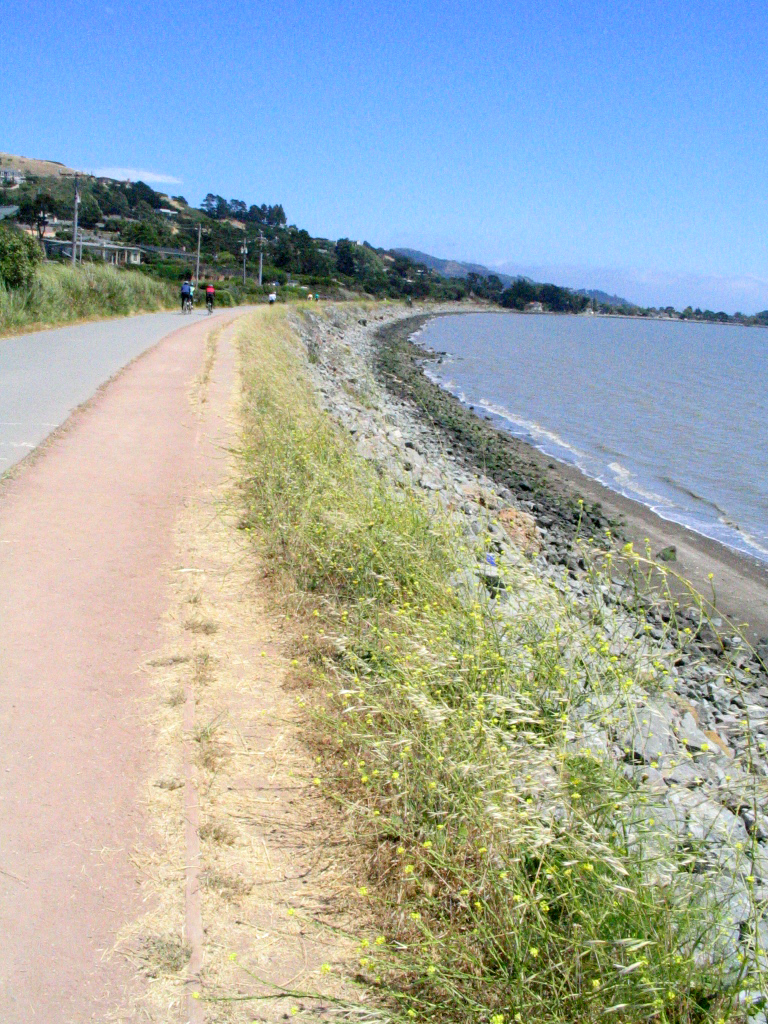
The former railroad grade now forms part of the San Francisco Bay Trail, used by hikers and cyclists.

Life changed little in the 40 years between the death of John Reed in 1842 and the arrival of Peter Donahue in 1882. Donahue brought with him the San Francisco and North Pacific Railroad (later the Northwestern Pacific Railroad). He made a deal with the Reed family for a right-of-way, blasted out the rock at Point Tiburon, and built a railroad terminal to connect with ferries of San Francisco Bay. The passenger ferries took commuters and automobiles to San Francisco and Sausalito, while barges carried loaded freight cars to San Francisco and Richmond.

Wildflowers surround Old St. Hilary's, Tiburon's iconic hillside landmark, which was originally a mission church named for St. Hilaire, Bishop of Poitiers. The heirs of John Reed—who held title to El Rancho Corte Madera del Presidio, the Mexican land grant that included the Tiburon Peninsula—deeded the one-quarter-acre site for $2.00 to the Archdiocese of San Francisco, which built the church as a place of worship for local railroad workers in 1888. The church was deconsecrated to make way for a new, larger one and was headed for destruction until several individuals intent on preserving local history established the Landmarks Society and purchased the site and building in 1959. It has served as a schoolroom and town meeting hall and is now a popular setting for weddings, concerts and other memorable events.

The last railroad-operated passenger ferry left Tiburon in 1941, but passenger and freight trains ran until 1967. Passenger ferry service was resumed in the 1960s when Harbor Carriers utilized sightseeing boats in the early morning and evening hours. In the 1970s, the railroad removed trackage, plugged tunnels, and demolished the trestle over Trestle Glen and railroad ferry pier. The railroad roadbed was purchased by the City of Tiburon and currently serves as the waterfront rail trail. After years of hearings and studies, the former railroad yards became the Point Tiburon housing and commercial project.

During its heyday, the railroad-ferry service brought many other industries to Tiburon. Codfish canneries sprouted along the bay shore to can fish shipped from Alaska. Ship dismantlers broke up obsolete ocean-going vessels. In 1904, the Navy established a huge coaling station on the east shore of the peninsula on the site of one of the old fish canneries. Brick kilns were built and several powder plants opened, and oyster beds developed in the shallow waters of the bay. The rail yards were fully equipped to repair and service trains, and build rolling stock and locomotives.

Several of the largest San Francisco Bay ferries were built in the Tiburon yards. The Navy coaling station has played a prominent part in the history of both Tiburon and Bay Area at large. Theodore Roosevelt's Great White Fleet was refueled there on its famous round-the-world cruise. Coaling service ended in 1931 and the California Maritime Academy moved in to train officers for the merchant fleet. Because the cranes remaining from coaling operations were operational, the company spinning cables for the Golden Gate Bridge set up shop.

=== World War II ===
As World War II loomed, the coaling station site was transformed into the United States Navy Net Depot Tiburon. This facility was used to manufacture and service nets used to stop enemy torpedoes and submarines from entering San Francisco Bay. Later, the U.S. Bureau of Mines and the U.S. Bureau of Fisheries established research facilities on the site, and the Coast Guard's icebreakers made this their summer home. It is now the Romberg Tiburon Center for Environmental Studies operated by San Francisco State University.

With all the seamen, sailors, railroad workers, cannery employees, and local dairymen in Tiburon, the taverns and other attractions of Main Street were popular on Saturday night. Prohibition did not interrupt Main Street activities as the railroad workers were able to signal the Tiburon depot as soon as revenuers boarded a train or ferry headed for town. By the time they got to Tiburon, prayer meetings were being held in the taverns. The volunteer fire department organized spirited baseball games, and the Corinthian Yacht Club was in full swing, so Main Street was not the only activity center.

World War II brought more people to Tiburon as the Navy built housing for NetDepot workers on the site of the present Hilarita Housing, for sailors from submarines at an annex to the Net Depot (now Paradise Beach County Park). Real estate development was minimal until after the war. The descendants of the Reed family still controlled most of the land that was used for cattle ranching. Small areas of filled land were sold to create the Bel Aire and Belveron Gardens subdivisions. The Little Reed Ranch was sold and Hawthorne Terrace, Del Mar, and Reed Heights subdivisions were under way by the time the County finally began preparing a Master Plan for the Tiburon Peninsula.

After several years of public hearings and discussions with the primary landowners, a Master Plan was completed in 1956. It included freeways on both sides of the peninsula, a four lane "ridge route" down the center of the peninsula (with a high-level bridge over Trestle Glen Boulevard), a shopping center on the crest of Ring Mountain, and a bridge to San Francisco (via Angel Island and Alcatraz) off the end. A land-use density of two homes to the acre, plus areas zoned for apartments and duplexes, would have permitted 50,000 to 60,000 people to live in Tiburon.

=== City incorporation and growth ===
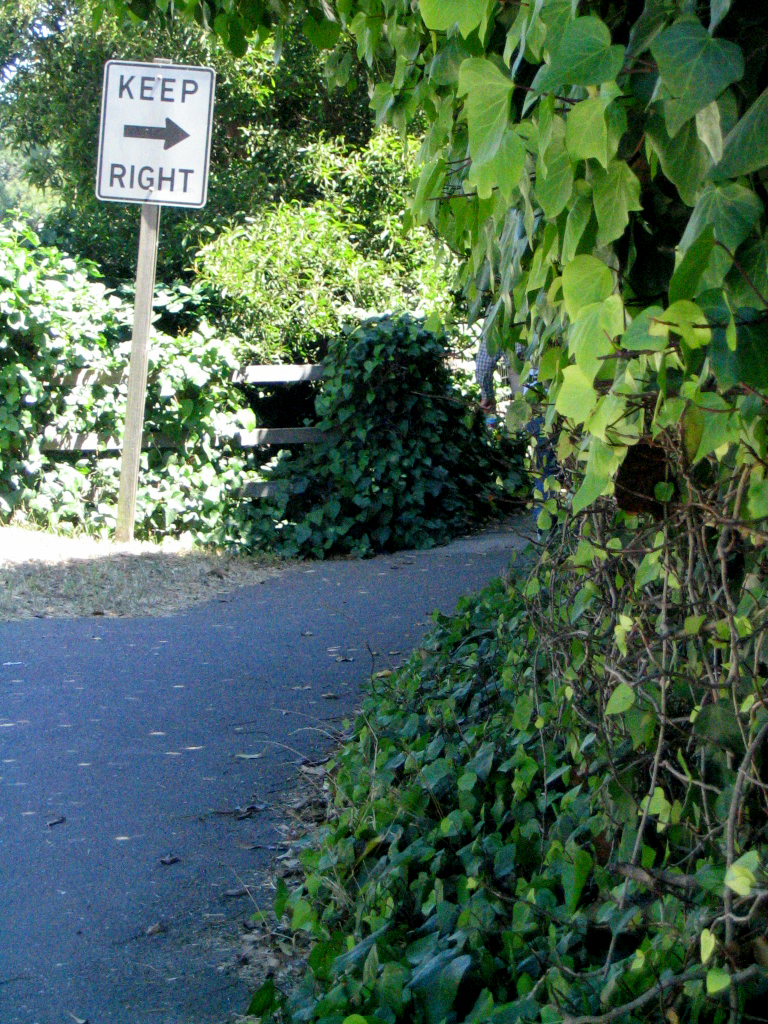
A rail trail passes through Richardson Bay Park and next to the Audubon Society's Richardson Bay Sanctuary within Tiburon town limits.

There had been numerous attempts to incorporate a City of Tiburon over the years, but they had all failed to come to a vote due to the opposition of the large land owners. The only semblance of local land use input came from the Tiburon Peninsula Coordinating Council (TPCC). This was made up of representatives of each of the home owners associations; the school, fire and sanitary districts; and the City of Belvedere. In 1963, after a number of adverse rulings by County planners regarding development on the Tiburon Peninsula, the leaders of the TPCC decided that another attempt to incorporate was justified. A separate incorporation committee was established and work began. The main issues were: revision of the 1956 Master Plan, improved police services, opposition to the bridge to San Francisco, preservation of open space, and a desire for responsive local government.

One of the first challenges to be decided was just what properties were to be included in the incorporated area. The mapping committee started with the Tiburon Fire Protection District map as a base. The properties of large land owners who had been able to frustrate previous attempts were eliminated from the map. Certain areas, such as the Reedlands and part of Belveron Gardens, which were outside the Tiburon Fire District, but which wanted to be in the new city, were added. Angel Island, also outside the fire district boundary, was more controversial. Most did not see any value to having it within the city limits, as it was a state park. The counter argument was that it was "there", and we wanted a say in whatever future development might be planned. The County Boundary Commission (later Marin Local Agency Formation Commission, or LAFCO), at the time made up of the members of the board of supervisors, wanted it out of the new city because of potential sales tax revenues.

They finally yielded to arguments put forth by the incorporation committee, and let it remain within the new city limits. In March 1964 an election was held to create the Town of Tiburon, and on June 23, 1964, the incorporation was final and a town council seated, and mayor elected.

A city manager was hired and a contract for police services was made with the county sheriff. A Planning Commission was established and commissioners appointed. Offices at 80 Main Street were rented. To help plan for the future the Tiburon Advisory Committee was appointed, consisting of citizens who had been active in community affairs. Their report, issued in 1965, outlined goals in land use, recreation, traffic, and "image".

In 1966, at the first election after incorporation, three of the incumbents were replaced. Over the next several years, the new city council strengthened the planning commission and divided it further into boards of design review and adjustments. They completed a new master plan and general plan for the peninsula and new zoning ordinances to implement the plans. They also created a parks and recreation commission. Special ordinances to protect trees and to protect views were created. Property values were rising faster than funds could be accumulated, so bonds were issued and several hundred acres of open space were acquired. Several hundred additional acres were purchased by the Nature Conservancy to permanently protect the ridgelines, and the city purchased additional land from the Navy. The railroad right-of-way, almost 2.5 miles (4.0 km) of frontage on Richardson Bay, was acquired for a rail trail.

One of the most difficult decisions involved traffic planning. After numerous public hearings it was finally decided that Tiburon Boulevard would remain a two-lane road east of Trestle Glen Boulevard traffic lights and turnouts were scheduled east of that point and eventually built. The four-lane bypass section from Highway 101 to Blackie's Pasture (the old Tiburon Boulevard became Greenwood Beach Road) was completed in 1966. The California Department of Transportation (Caltrans) had anticipated extending the four lanes downtown, so the fill created during this project was placed in the Bay east of Blackie's Pasture, and after the City did some land swapping with Caltrans, became McKegney Green and the park South of the Knoll Park. Blackie's Pasture property was also acquired and became part of the series of waterfront parks and paths known as the Richardson Bay Lineal Park.

LAFCO determined that Tiburon's sphere of influence would extend to Highway 101. Annexation of the rest of the peninsula was attempted but never successful due to opposition in Strawberry. Eventually, those areas that wished to be within the city limits were annexed, and the city grew westward to include the Reedland Woods, Bel Aire, Tiburon Crest and Cypress Hollow subdivisions.

=== After 1997 ===
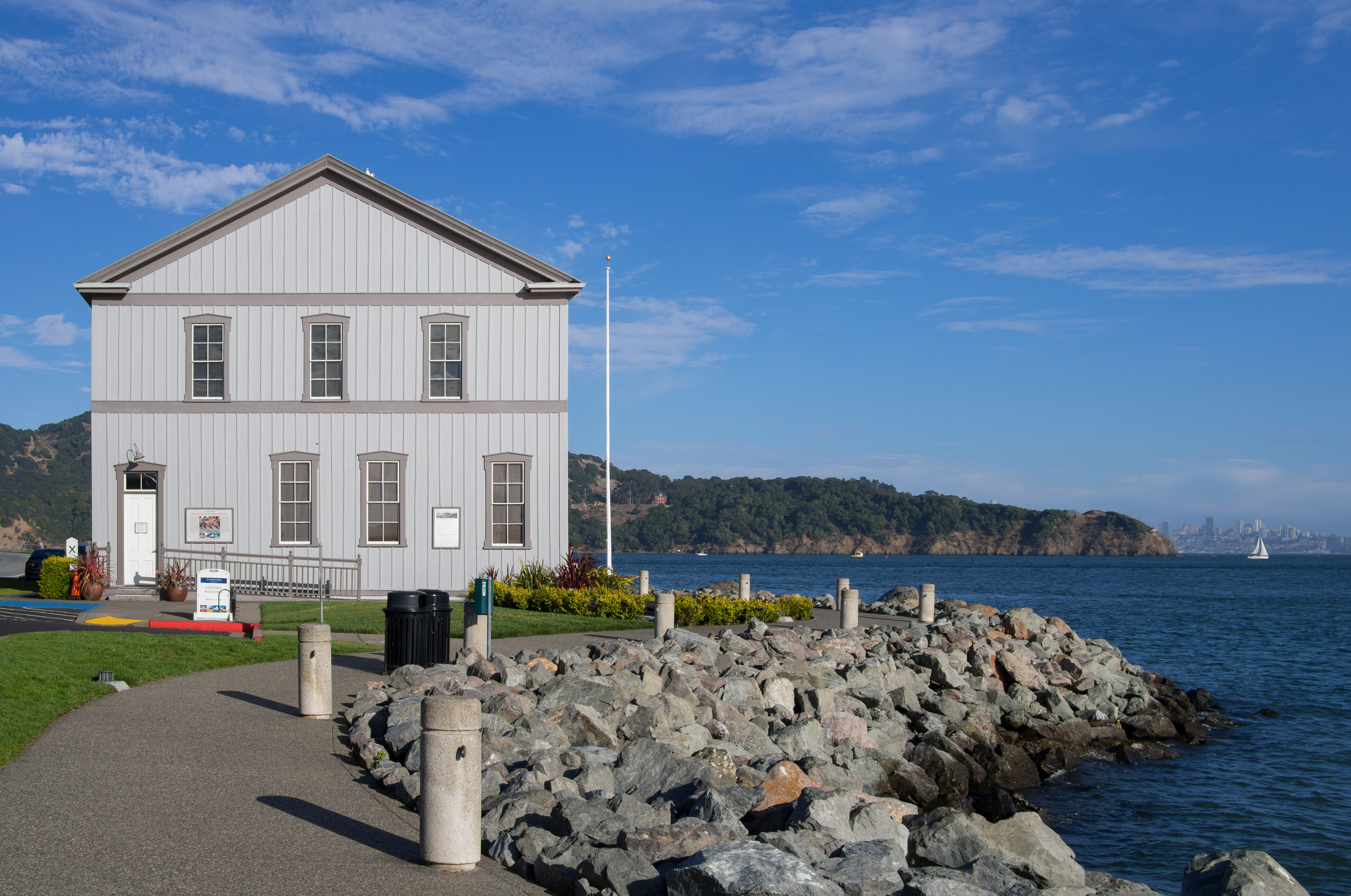
Tiburon Railroad & Ferry Depot Museum

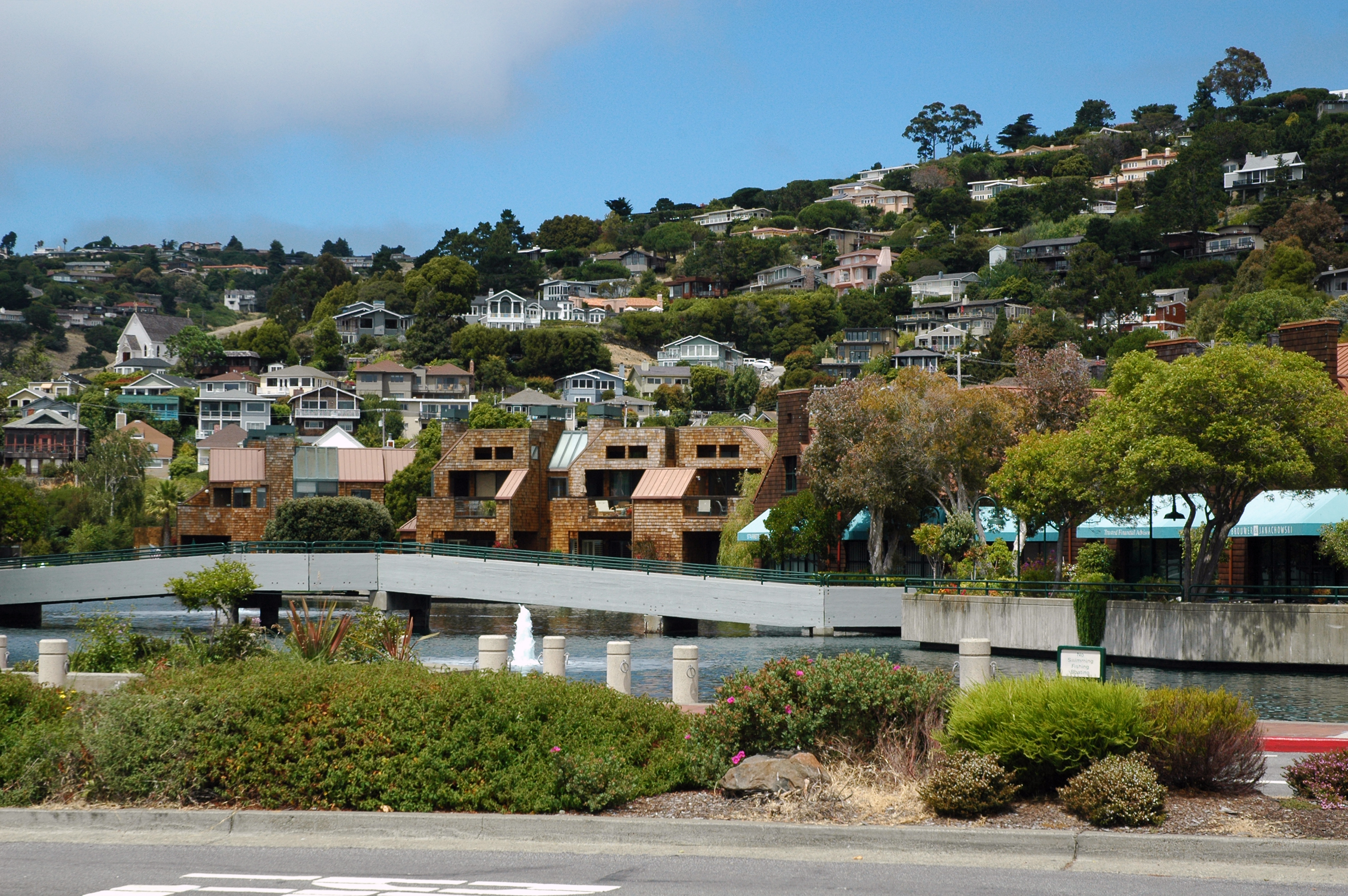
A modern development on Tiburon Boulevard, with the residential neighborhood Hill Haven in the background

The completion of the Point Tiburon development in the former railroad yards in 1985 signaled a change in the population mix and needs of the area. In 1997 a new Town Hall was opened with a new Belvedere-Tiburon Library next door. A new police station followed in 2000.

Following a large and successful Millennium Party, the Town has pursued a policy to revitalize Main Street and the rest of downtown Tiburon. Main Street was reconstructed to make it and the shops and restaurants handicapped accessible without ruining its quaint charm. The Allan Thompson Walkway along the water side of Main Street was completely rebuilt. In the summer of 2004, a series of "Friday Nights on Main Street" community parties was inaugurated. Main Street was closed to automobile traffic on Friday nights during the summer and the restaurants created special menus for the occasion. Tables in the street in front of each restaurant added to the festivities. As of 2025, the festival continues.

In November 2006, a commissioned fountain with a nautically themed sculpture titled "Coming About" at the entrance to Main Street was formally dedicated. The $250,000 material cost of the sculpture was donated by the Zelinsky family, longtime owners of many commercial properties in Tiburon. The sculpture was designed by Jeffery Reed and Jennifer Madden, who donated 6,000 hours to its creation.

== Development ==
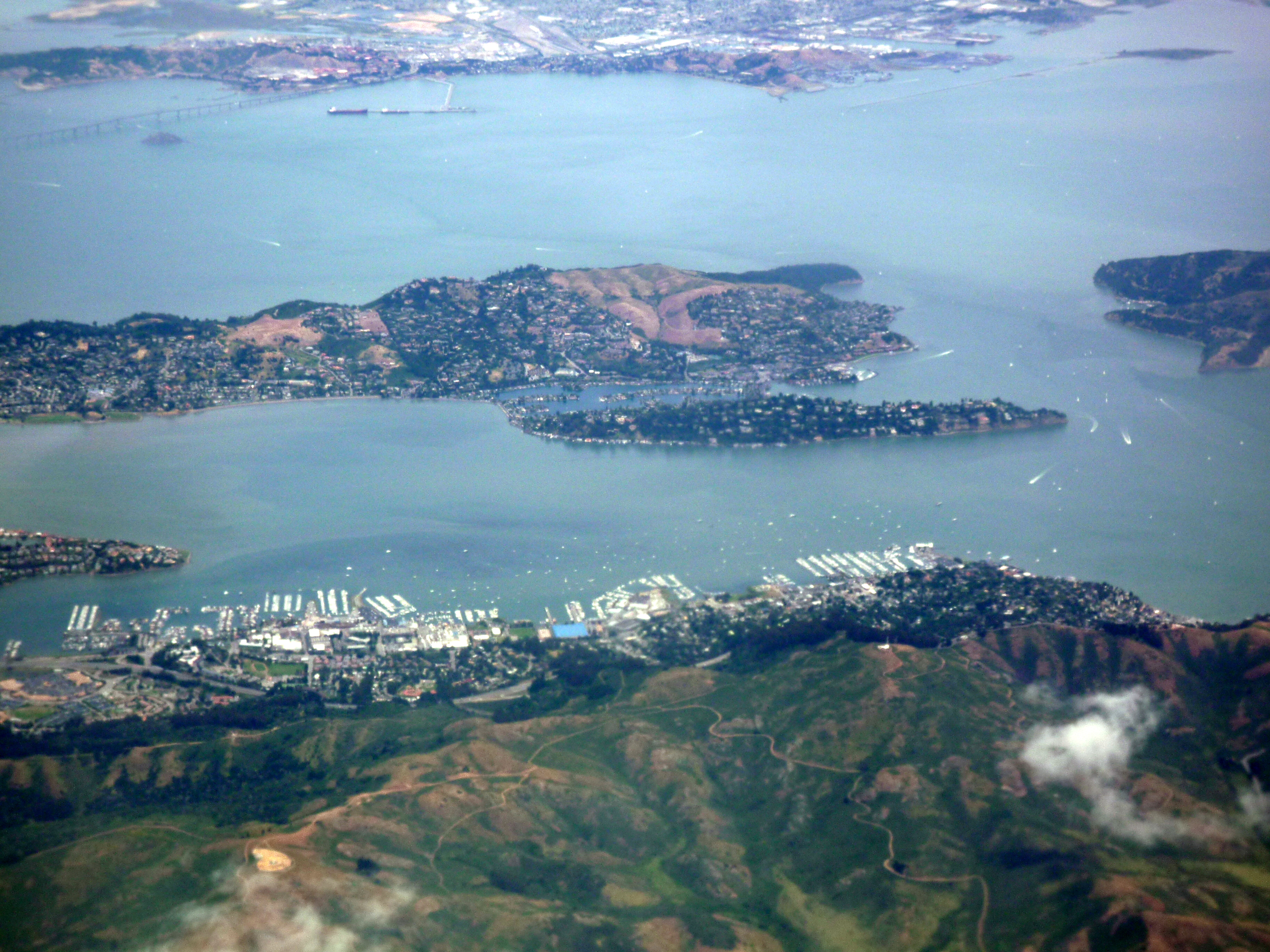
Aerial view of the Tiburon Peninsula

Controversies surrounding development are significant public policy issues facing the town; this condition has endured for at least three decades.

At the lowest level, any new construction or exterior renovation, commercial or residential, must be approved by the design review board, which often applies stringent criteria to avoid "eyesores" and preserve neighbors' views.

More significantly, there remain several large tracts of undeveloped land, virtually all of which have owners who desire to build multiple residences on these properties. Many of these properties, while located on the Tiburon Peninsula, are outside of town boundaries. However, under a LAFCO policy, any urbanization of these lands would result in their being annexed by the town since it is the town that would provide needed services. Hence, it is the town planning commission and ultimately the town council that determines the extent that these lands can be developed. Major tracts of land currently in various stages of planning or permitting include the Martha Property, Easton Point and Tiburon Glen. The permitting processes in all cases are lengthy and contentious, pitting developers against active and organized residents seeking to preserve the open space and quasi-rural character of the area and avoid the kind of traffic seen by other Bay Area communities. Particularly active in opposing development is the Tiburon Last Chance Committee. No development has yet begun on any of these open tracts.

The Martha Co. property and Easton Point, the largest of the undeveloped lands, are particularly contested issues, with court battles dating back to 1975. Historically the Ring Mountain property was an area of contest, especially due to the high biodiversity and presence of rare and endangered species, such as the mariposa lily.

In 2002, residents in a referendum narrowly defeated a proposed rule that would have prohibited much of the development on open tracts of land by, among other things, banning development near ridgelines. Among the arguments against this proposal were that it would subject the town to costly lawsuits by developers claiming their economic rights had been unjustly impaired.

A 2006 controversy concerned the expansion plans of the Kol Shofar Synagogue. These were opposed by a number of neighbors, principally over the size of a new multi-purpose room, and the traffic and noise impact of a proposed 27 additional events with up to 250 persons. The Tiburon Planning Commission in the summer of 2006 rejected the expansion plans, claiming that Kol Shofar refused to engage in compromise discussions. This brought the issue to the Tiburon Town Council. In October 2006, the dispute took on broader significance when Kol Shofar proponents raised issues of religious freedom. Specifically, they claimed that the federal Religious Land Use and Institutionalized Persons Act (RLUIPA), which prohibits "substantial burdens" on the exercise of religion by government regulations, would be violated if the Town prohibited their expansion plans. The synagogue retained The Becket Fund for Religious Liberty, which threatened litigation (depending on the outcome). The Tiburon City Council tried to resolve the issue late in the 2006 by permitting a somewhat reduced expansion with restrictions on event sizes and hours and provisions to mitigate the parking, noise and traffic impacts. However, in March 2007, a group of neighbors sued both the town and the synagogue, alleging environmental and land-use violations. In 2008, a Marin Superior Court judge ruled in favor of the expansion, and the Coalition filed an appeal with the 1st District Court of Appeal. The appeal was ultimately dropped later that same year, and Kol Shofar was able to proceed, agreeing not to seek repayment of court costs. Kol Shofar's new space opened on August 29, 2010.

== Geography and climate ==
Tiburon is located at 37°52′25″N 122°27′24″W.

According to the United States Census Bureau, the town has a total area of 13.2 square miles (34 km^{2}), of which 4.4 square miles (11 km^{2}) is land and 8.7 square miles (23 km^{2}) (66.27%) is water, much in the form of Richardson Bay.

The serpentine soils of Ring Mountain and the Tiburon hills are host to a unique plant community, including several endemic or near-endemic species, notably, the Tiburon mariposa lily, the Tiburon indian paintbrush, and the Tiburon jewelflower, as well as a number of other rare and endangered species Ring Mountain is also a significant location of Native American prehistoric sites, notably rock carvings.

Climate data for Tiburon, California
Month	Jan	Feb	Mar	Apr	May	Jun	Jul	Aug	Sep	Oct	Nov	Dec	Year
Record high °F (°C)	79 (26)	81 (27)	84 (29)	94 (34)	96 (36)	101 (38)	103 (39)	96 (36)	101 (38)	102 (39)	86 (30)	76 (24)	103 (39)
Mean daily maximum °F (°C)	55.3 (12.9)	59.6 (15.3)	63.0 (17.2)	66.0 (18.9)	69.6 (20.9)	73.8 (23.2)	76.4 (24.7)	76.8 (24.9)	76.8 (24.9)	72.0 (22.2)	62.6 (17.0)	55.4 (13.0)	67.3 (19.6)
Mean daily minimum °F (°C)	42.9 (6.1)	44.8 (7.1)	46.0 (7.8)	47.5 (8.6)	50.0 (10.0)	52.7 (11.5)	54.0 (12.2)	54.4 (12.4)	53.8 (12.1)	51.4 (10.8)	47.1 (8.4)	43.0 (6.1)	49.0 (9.4)
Record low °F (°C)	30 (−1)	31 (−1)	35 (2)	40 (4)	44 (7)	47 (8)	47 (8)	48 (9)	48 (9)	43 (6)	39 (4)	27 (−3)	27 (−3)
Average precipitation inches (mm)	5.13 (130)	4.96 (126)	3.54 (90)	1.77 (45)	0.85 (22)	0.24 (6.1)	0 (0)	0 (0)	0.12 (3.0)	1.22 (31)	2.72 (69)	5.25 (133)	25.80 (655)

== Demographics ==
The population of Tiburon since incorporation.

Historical population

Year	Pop.	±%
1970	6,209	—
1980	6,685	+7.7%
1990	7,532	+12.7%
2000	8,666	+15.1%

Year	Pop.	±%
2010	8,962	+3.4%
2020	9,146	+2.1%
2025 est.	8,881	−2.9%

Source: U.S. Decennial Census
1860–1870 1880-1890
1900 1910 1920
1930 1940 1950
1960 1970 1980
1990 2000 2010
2020

=== 2020 census ===
As of the 2020 census, Tiburon had a population of 9,146 and a population density of 2,041.5 inhabitants per square mile (788.2/km^{2}). The census reported that 99.5% of the population lived in households and 0.5% were institutionalized.

Racial composition as of the 2020 census
Race	Number	Percent
White	7,261	79.4%
Black or African American	91	1.0%
American Indian and Alaska Native	19	0.2%
Asian	687	7.5%
Native Hawaiian and Other Pacific Islander	13	0.1%
Some other race	193	2.1%
Two or more races	882	9.6%
Hispanic or Latino (of any race)	582	6.4%

There were 3,714 households, out of which 32.0% included children under the age of 18. Of all households, 57.0% were married-couple households, 4.5% were cohabiting couple households, 26.0% had a female householder with no spouse or partner present, and 12.5% had a male householder with no spouse or partner present. About 25.5% of households were one person households, and 16.1% were one-person households with someone aged 65 or older. The average household size was 2.45. There were 2,575 families (69.3% of all households).

The age distribution was 22.5% under the age of 18, 5.3% aged 18 to 24, 15.6% aged 25 to 44, 30.2% aged 45 to 64, and 26.3% who were 65 years of age or older. The median age was 49.2 years. For every 100 females, there were 90.2 males, and for every 100 females age 18 and over there were 87.0 males age 18 and over.

There were 4,047 housing units at an average density of 903.3 units per square mile (348.8 units/km^{2}). Of these, 3,714 (91.8%) were occupied, 67.2% were owner-occupied, and 32.8% were occupied by renters. The homeowner vacancy rate was 1.1% and the rental vacancy rate was 5.7%. 99.7% of residents lived in urban areas, while 0.3% lived in rural areas.

=== Income and poverty ===
In 2023, the US Census Bureau estimated that the median household income was $212,794, and the per capita income was $135,013. About 0.0% of families and 1.3% of the population were below the poverty line.

=== 2010 census ===
The 2010 United States census reported that Tiburon had a population of 8,962. The population density was 679.9 inhabitants per square mile (262.5/km^{2}). The racial makeup of Tiburon was 7,899 (88.1%) White, 83 (0.9%) African American, 16 (0.2%) Native American, 505 (5.6%) Asian, 8 (0.1%) Pacific Islander, 80 (0.9%) from other races, and 371 (4.1%) from two or more races. Hispanic or Latino of any race were 410 persons (4.6%).

The Census reported that 8,924 people (99.6% of the population) lived in households, 6 (0.1%) lived in non-institutionalized group quarters, and 32 (0.4%) were institutionalized.

There were 3,729 households, out of which 1,160 (31.1%) had children under the age of 18 living in them, 2,116 (56.7%) were opposite-sex married couples living together, 280 (7.5%) had a female householder with no husband present, 86 (2.3%) had a male householder with no wife present. There were 157 (4.2%) unmarried opposite-sex partnerships, and 20 (0.5%) same-sex married couples or partnerships. 1,029 households (27.6%) were made up of individuals, and 528 (14.2%) had someone living alone who was 65 years of age or older. The average household size was 2.39. There were 2,482 families (66.6% of all households); the average family size was 2.94.

The population was spread out, with 2,150 people (24.0%) under the age of 18, 295 people (3.3%) aged 18 to 24, 1,582 people (17.7%) aged 25 to 44, 3,037 people (33.9%) aged 45 to 64, and 1,898 people (21.2%) who were 65 years of age or older. The median age was 48.0 years. For every 100 females, there were 87.9 males. For every 100 females age 18 and over, there were 84.2 males.

There were 4,025 housing units at an average density of 305.3 per square mile (117.9/km^{2}), of which 2,530 (67.8%) were owner-occupied, and 1,199 (32.2%) were occupied by renters. The homeowner vacancy rate was 1.5%; the rental vacancy rate was 5.0%. 6,406 people (71.5% of the population) lived in owner-occupied housing units and 2,518 people (28.1%) lived in rental housing units.

Belvedere / Tiburon was ranked by Forbes magazine as among the 20 most expensive real-estate markets in the United States. It ranked 18th.

== Economy ==
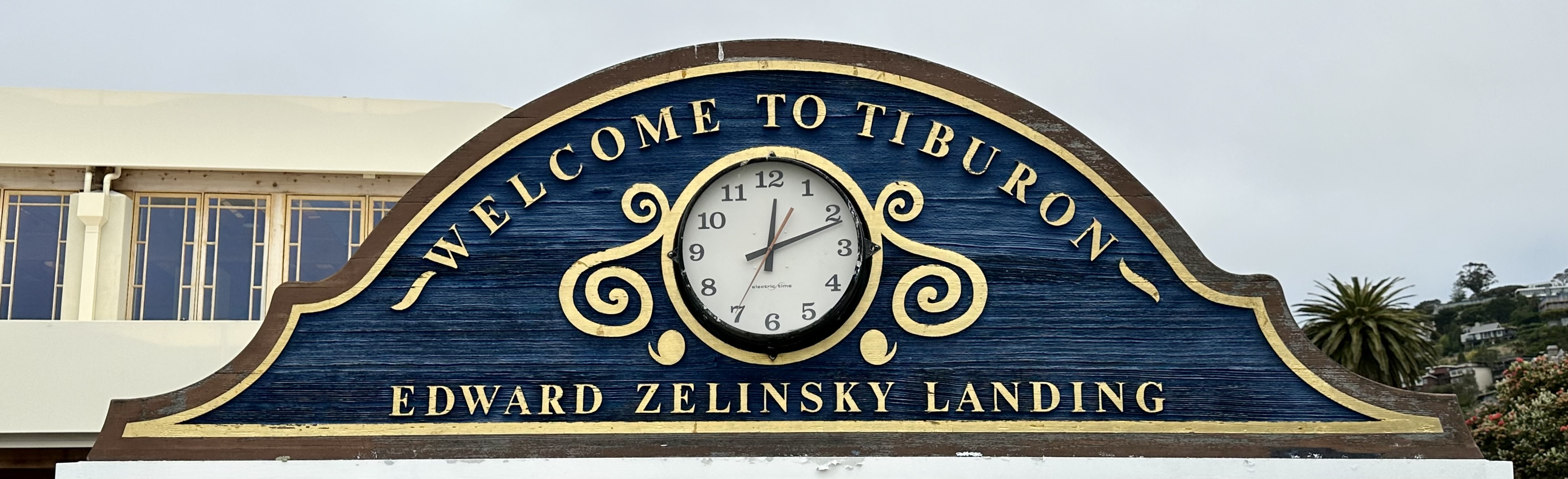

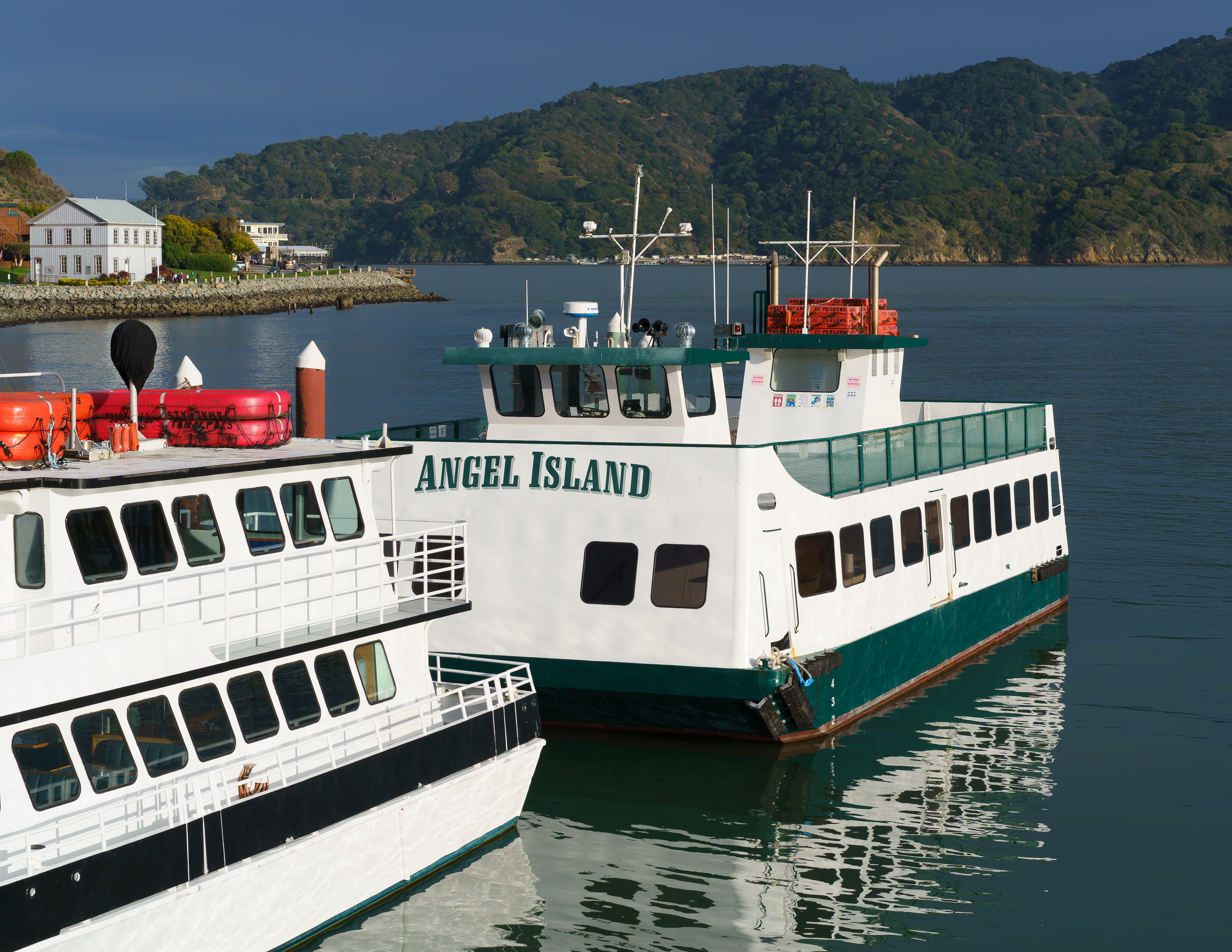
Tiburon is the nearest mainland point to Angel Island and a regular ferry service from the Tiburon Ferry Terminal connects to the island.

Tiburon features numerous small boutiques and restaurants, catering to local residents and tourists. Most of the town's restaurants are located on or near Main Street, near the Tiburon Ferry Terminal. Besides the boat to the San Francisco Ferry Building, the Angel Island-Tiburon Ferry provides daily service to nearby Angel Island.

In 2004, Tiburon became the first city in the world to eliminate trans-fats from all its restaurants.

There is a small shopping center named The Boardwalk downtown, and another, The Cove, in the Bel Aire neighborhood.

One weekly newspaper is published in the town titled The Ark, since 1973, which covers local news and events. It has been named a national General Excellence winner among small weekly newspapers in the U.S. by the National Newspaper Association each year 2014-2019 and again in 2022. It also has been named a state General Excellence winner among small weekly newspapers by the California News Publishers Association in 2014 and each year 2018-2021.

== Government ==
=== Federal and state ===
In the United States House of Representatives, Tiburon is in California's 2nd congressional district, represented by Democrat Jared Huffman. From 2008 to 2012, Huffman represented Marin County in the California State Assembly.

In the California State Legislature, Tiburon is in:

- the 12th Assembly district, represented by Democrat Damon Connolly
- the 2nd senatorial district, represented by Democrat Mike McGuire.

Tiburon has a council–manager government. The five members of the Tiburon Town Council are elected for staggered four-year terms. The council elects one of its members to be mayor and rotates the position each year in December.

=== Politics ===
According to the California secretary of state, as of February 10, 2019, Tiburon has 6,295 registered voters. Of those, 2,974 (47.2%) are registered Democrats, 1,203 (19.1%) are registered Republicans, and 1,879 (29.8%) have declined to state a political party.

== Education ==
=== Schools ===
Tiburon, Belvedere, and a part of Corte Madera are in the Reed Union School District. The district has three schools, all located in Tiburon: Reed Elementary (grades K–2); Bel Aire Elementary (grades 3–5); and Del Mar Middle School (grades 6–8). All three have been recognized as "California Distinguished Schools" by the state department of education. St. Hilary School, a Catholic primary school for children in grades K–8, is also located in Tiburon and serves students from Belvedere, Tiburon, Strawberry, Sausalito, Marin City, Mill Valley and other communities. St. Hilary School is an "Apple Distinguished School."

All three of Tiburon's public schools have gone or are undergoing substantial renovation and expansion. Reed completed reconstruction in 2004, and both Bel Aire and Del Mar completed reconstruction in 2006.

Tiburon is in the Reed Union School District and the Marin Community College District. Tiburon graduates attended Tamalpais High School in Mill Valley from 1908, when Tam opened, until 1958, when Redwood High School opened in Larkspur, with Reed Union School District in its attendance area.

Saint Hilary School is a Catholic school in Tiburon.

=== Public libraries ===
The Belvedere Tiburon Library is located in Tiburon. Established in 1895 by the Temple Library Society of Tiburon, it has moved several times before settling in its current location in April 1997. The library began a $18.31 million expansion project in 2019 which completed in 2022, leading to a current size of 19,117 sq ft.

== Natural hazards ==
In 2006, Tiburon launched the Get Ready 94920 program, which seeks to make Tiburon the first city in the United States to train 100% of its citizens in disaster preparedness. In 2014, Tiburon announced that they would be putting up tsunami warning signs down by some public coastal areas, though they were never installed. In 2011, the tsunami from Japan hit the coast of Richardson Bay, and waves as high as 7 feet (2.1 m) were observed.

== Notable people ==
- Novelist Isabel Allende (born 1942) resides in Tiburon.
- Former San Francisco Giants baseball player Barry Bonds (born 1964) resides in Tiburon.
- John W. Bowen (1910–1977), U.S. Army lieutenant general
- Businesswoman Jan Brandt owns a home in Tiburon.
- Actress Shoshana Bush (born 1988) is a Tiburon native.
- Photojournalist Virginia de Carvalho, 1917–1946
- Actor Clint Eastwood (born 1930) and actress Sondra Locke (1944–2018) lived there in the mid-1970s.
- Geneticist Charles Epstein (1933–2011) died in Tiburon.
- Author and entrepreneur Jon Fisher (born 1972) resides in Tiburon.
- Actor Paul Frees (1920–1986) lived there until his death.
- Author Barbara Meislin, known as the Purple Lady of Tiburon
- Skier Jonny Moseley (born 1975) has lived in Tiburon since 1978.
- Radio host Michael Savage (born 1942) resides in Tiburon and hosts The Savage Nation from his house.
- Film director Henry Selick (born 1952) resides in Tiburon.
- Screenwriter Stirling Silliphant (1918–1996) resided in Tiburon until 1988.
- NBA star Klay Thompson (born 1990), resided in Tiburon for a period during his tenure with the Golden State Warriors.
- Musician Lars Ulrich, drummer for Metallica, (born 1963) lived there for a period until 2019.
- Actor Robin Williams (1951–2014) lived there in his youth and moved back several years before his death.
- Tennis player Andre Agassi lived in Tiburon from 2001 to 2006.

== In popular culture ==
- Singer Van Morrison's album Keep Me Singing (2016) features a track called "In Tiburon".
- Tiburon is the setting for the animated children's series Kenny the Shark.

== See also ==
- Blackie (American horse)
- List of people from Marin County, California
- Old Saint Hilary's Church
- Streptanthus niger, an endangered species within the family Brassicaceae
