= Virginia de Carvalho =

American photojournalist

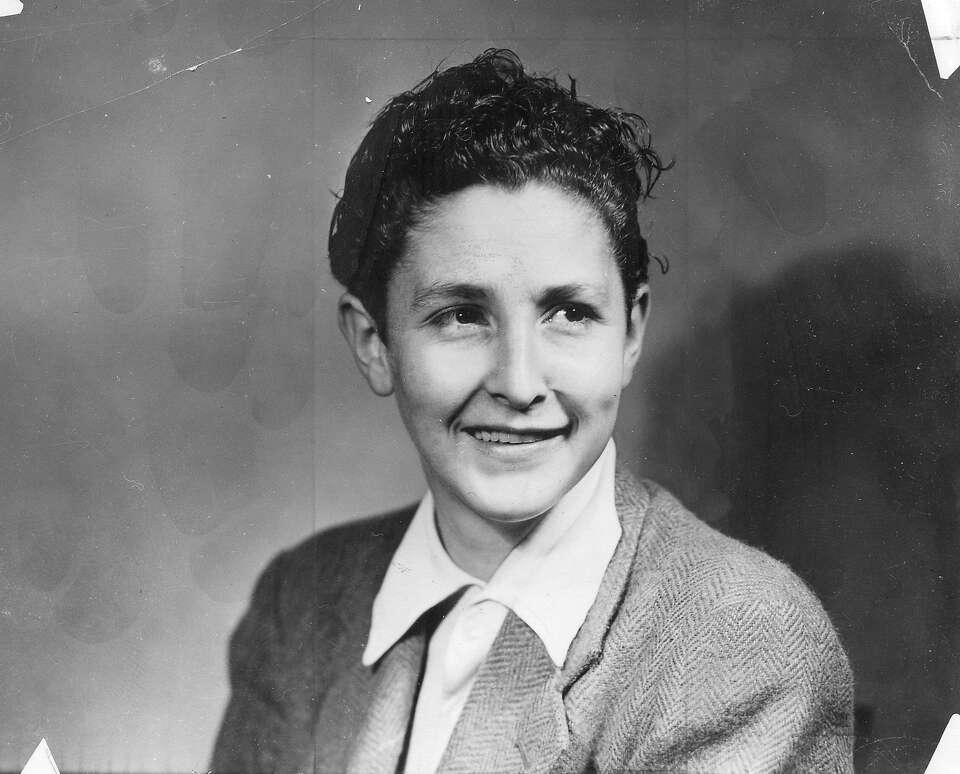
- Virginia de Carvalho, 1943
- Born: Virginia Evangeline de Carvalho; February 15, 1917; Hong Kong
- Died: December 11, 1946 (aged 29); San Francisco
- Resting place: Saint Mary Cemetery (Oakland, California)
- Known for: Photography

Virginia de Carvalho (1917–1946) was a pioneering female photojournalist. Reporters referred to her as "the west coast's first woman newspaper photographer" in one instance and as "the first woman press photographer in San Francisco" in another. Hired in 1941 by the San Francisco Chronicle as a wartime replacement in an entry-level position, she became a staff photographer in 1943. While publishing her pictures of sports events, celebrities, and news features, the paper also printed reports highlighting the novelty of a woman in a male-dominated occupation and calling attention to her fearlessness in positioning herself to get a good shot. Small in stature and youthful in appearance, she was once mistaken for an intruder in one early assignment and ejected for being a "cute little pest". In 1945 she produced a remarkable series of photographs recording the jubilation on San Francisco's Market Street at the close of the war. The Chronicle discharged her in 1946 when male photographers returned to work on completing their military service. She died of an unspecified illness later that year.

== Early life ==
De Carvalho was born in Hong Kong and raised in Shanghai. Her father, a dental surgeon and head of an import-export concern, was an amateur artist and photographer. She was educated at a boarding school founded by American nuns that was formally called the School of the Sisters of the Sacred Heart and informally known as the Convent of the Sacred Heart. Located in Shanghai's French Concession, its teachers gave instruction in English to classes from Kindergarten onward.

== Career ==
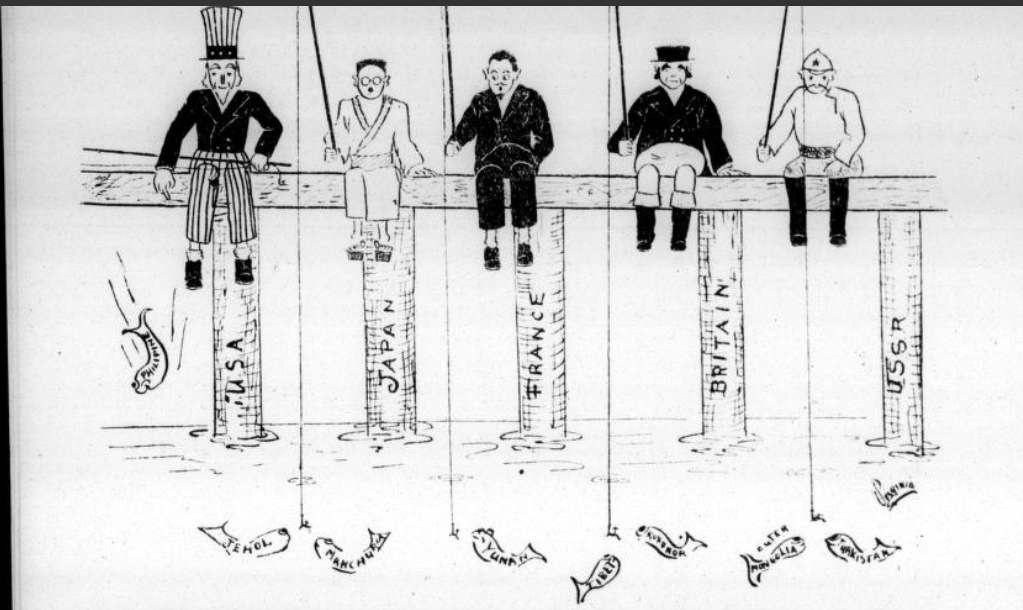
Virginia de Carvalho, The Far Eastern International "Fish-Pond", 1933

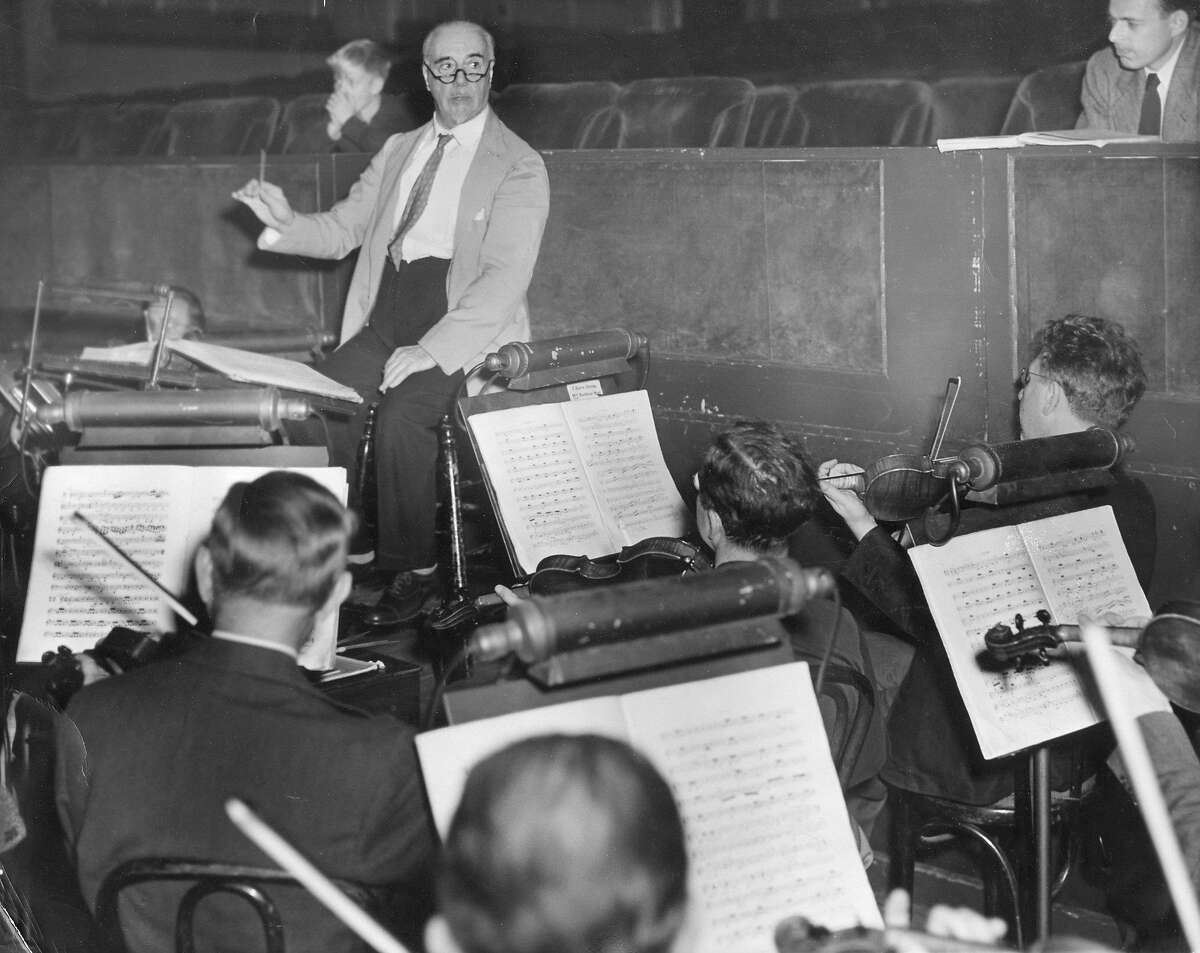
Virginia de Carvalho,Sir Thomas Beecham Rehearsing the San Francisco Symphony Orchestra, 1943

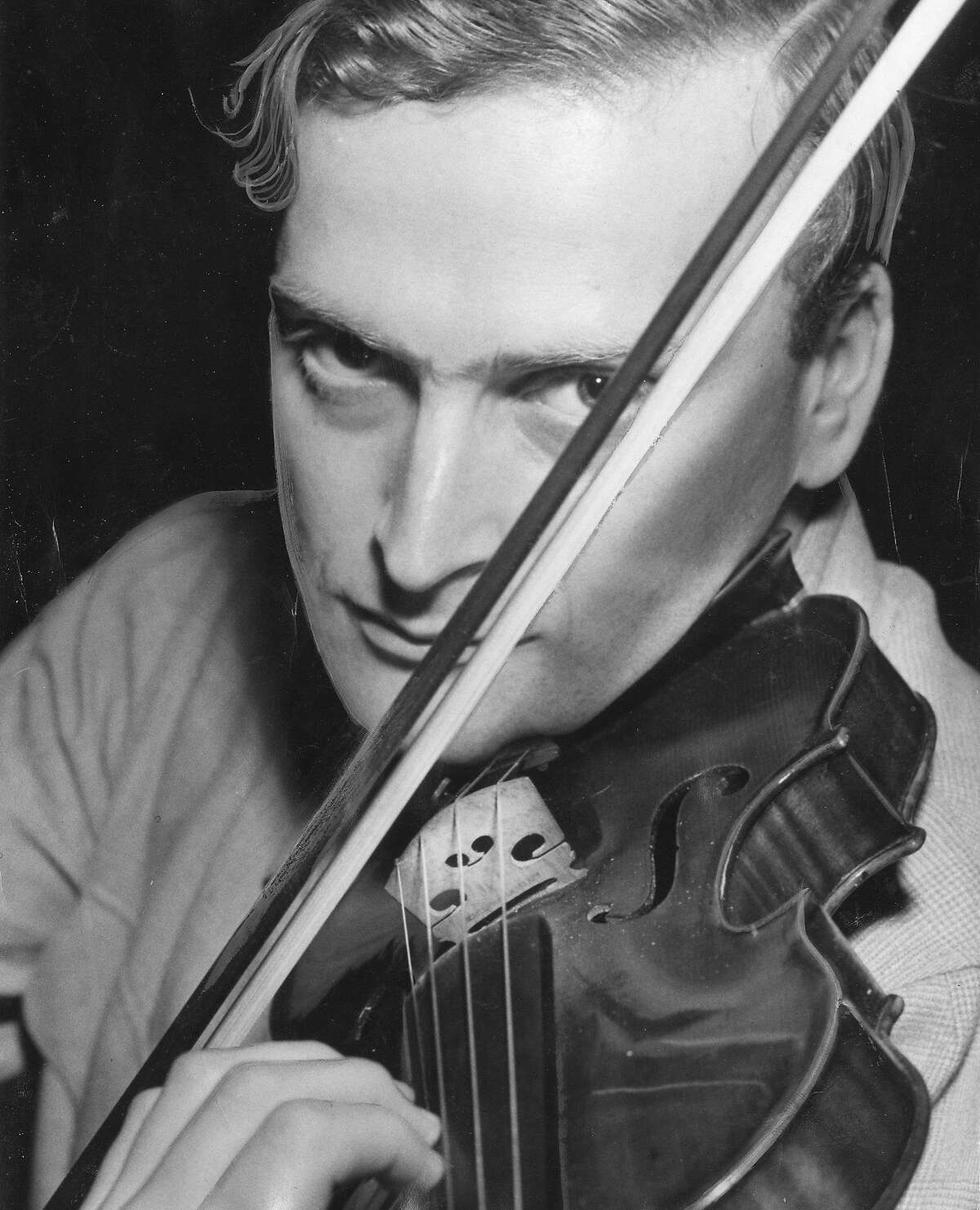
Virginia de Carvalho, Yehudi Menuhin, 1945

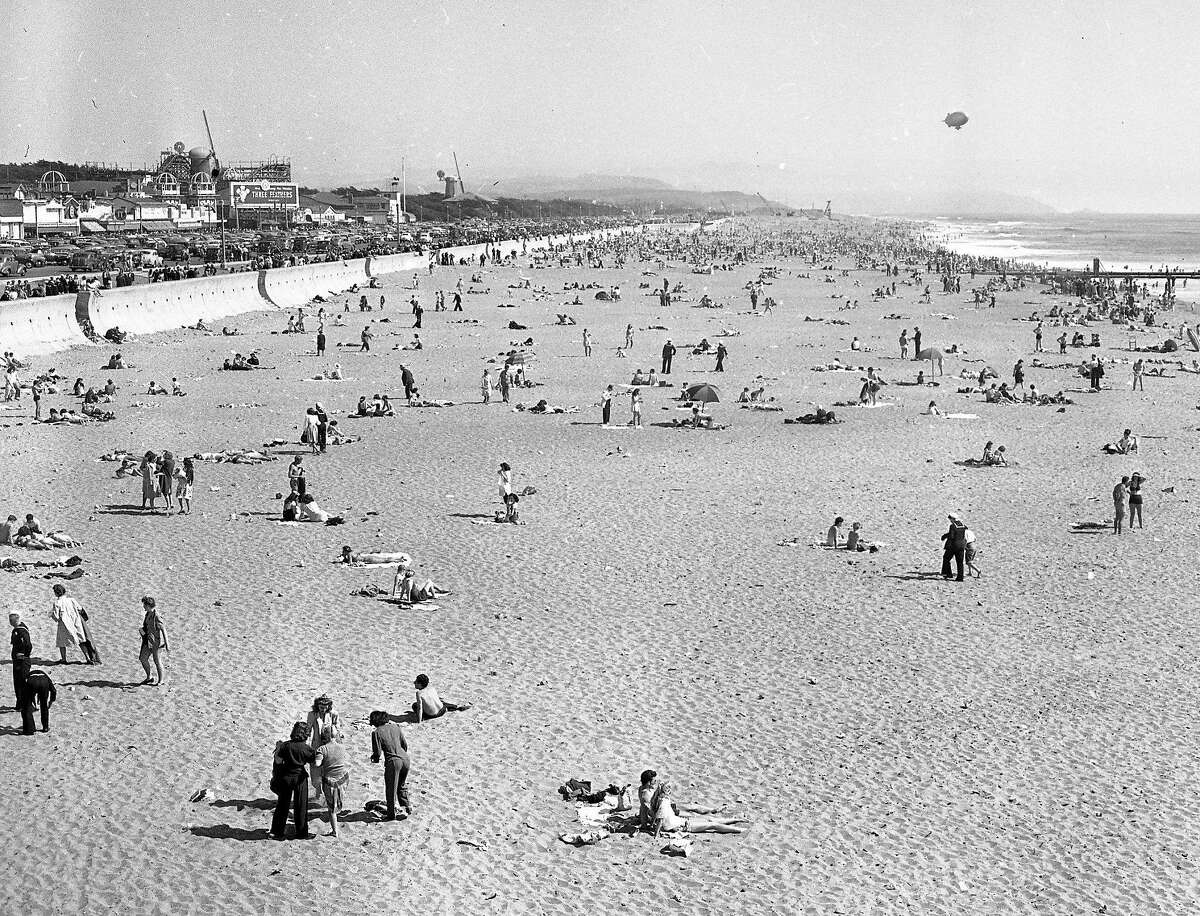
Virginia de Carvalho, Ocean Beach, 1945

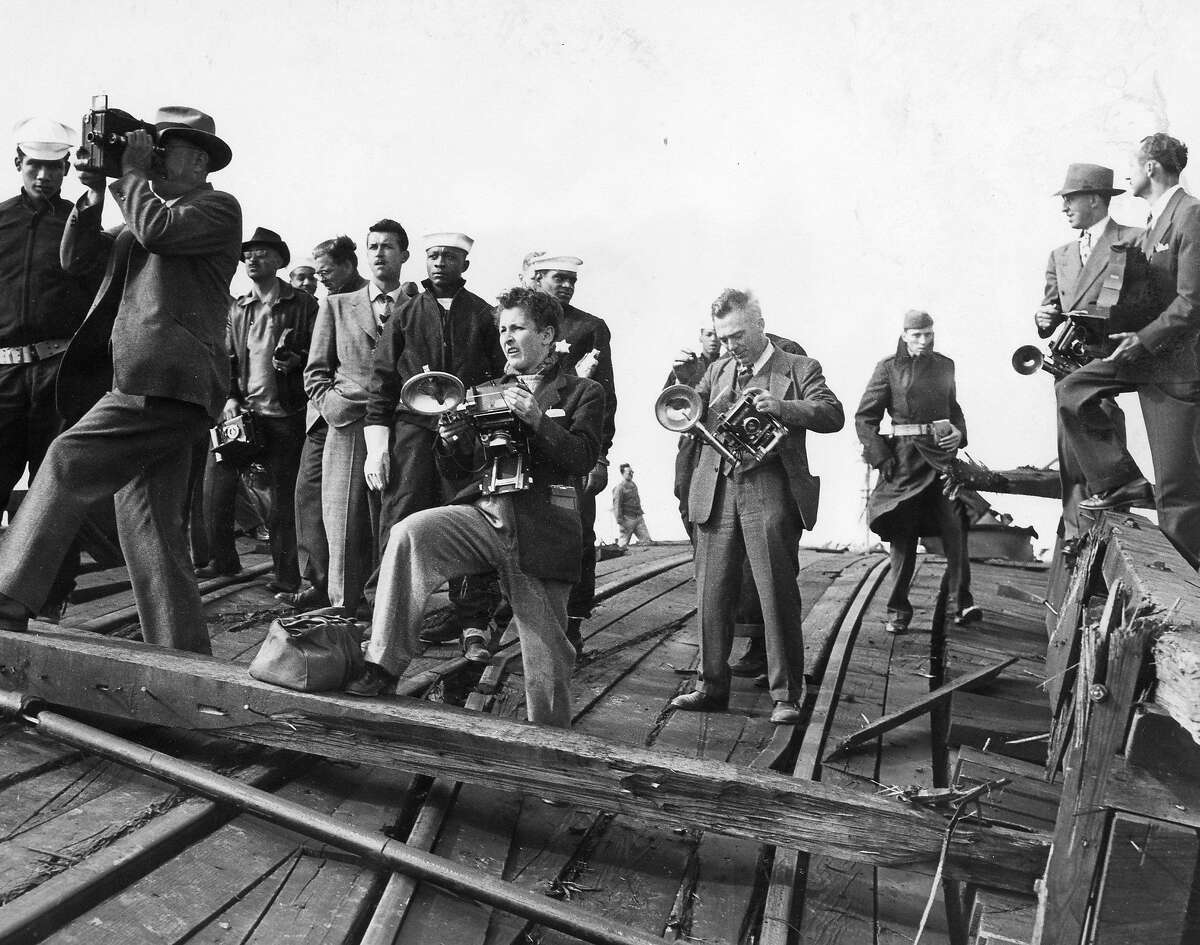
Virginia de Carvalho at the Site of a Munitions Explosion, 1943

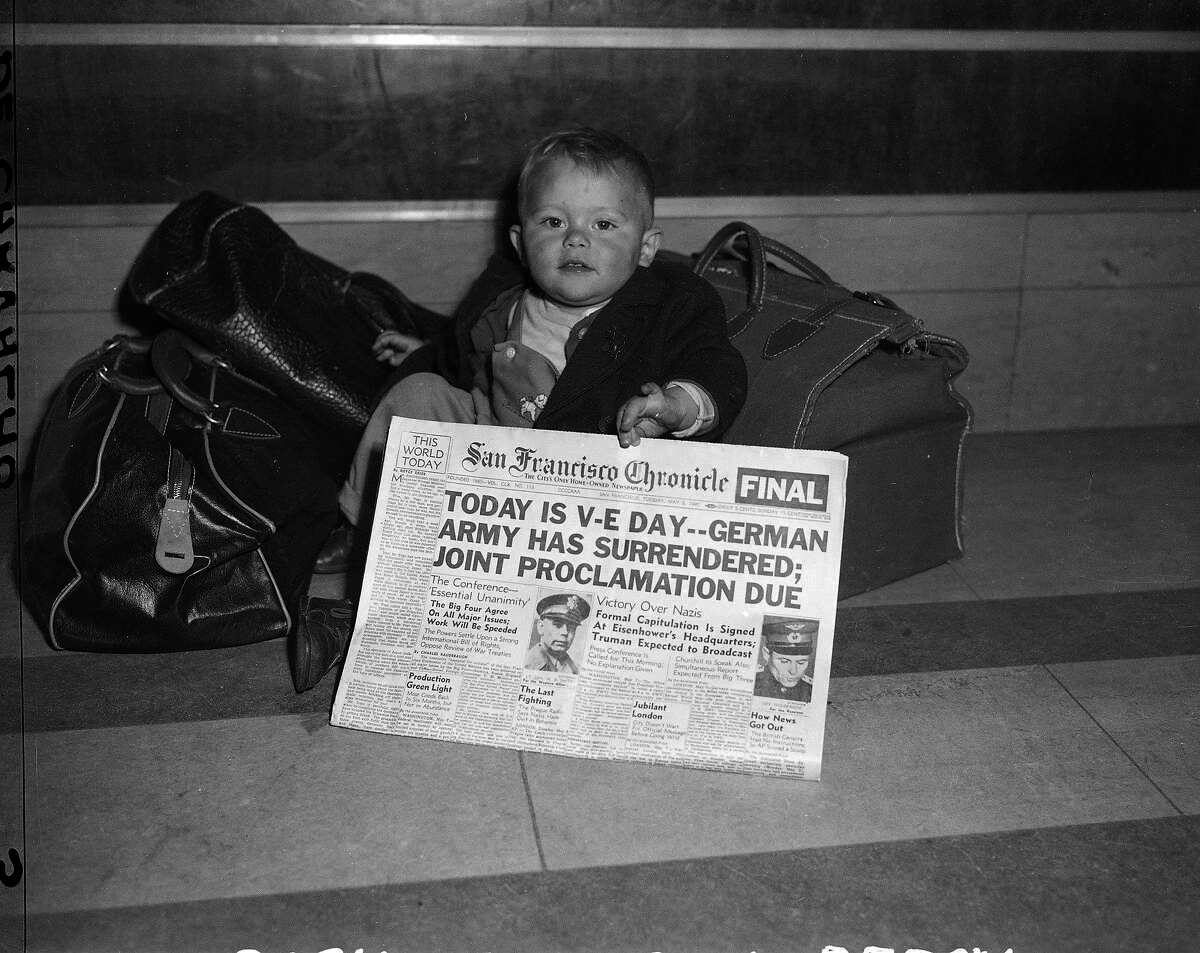
Virginia de Carvalho, Baby Holding a Newspaper Announcing Victory in Europe, May 8, 1945

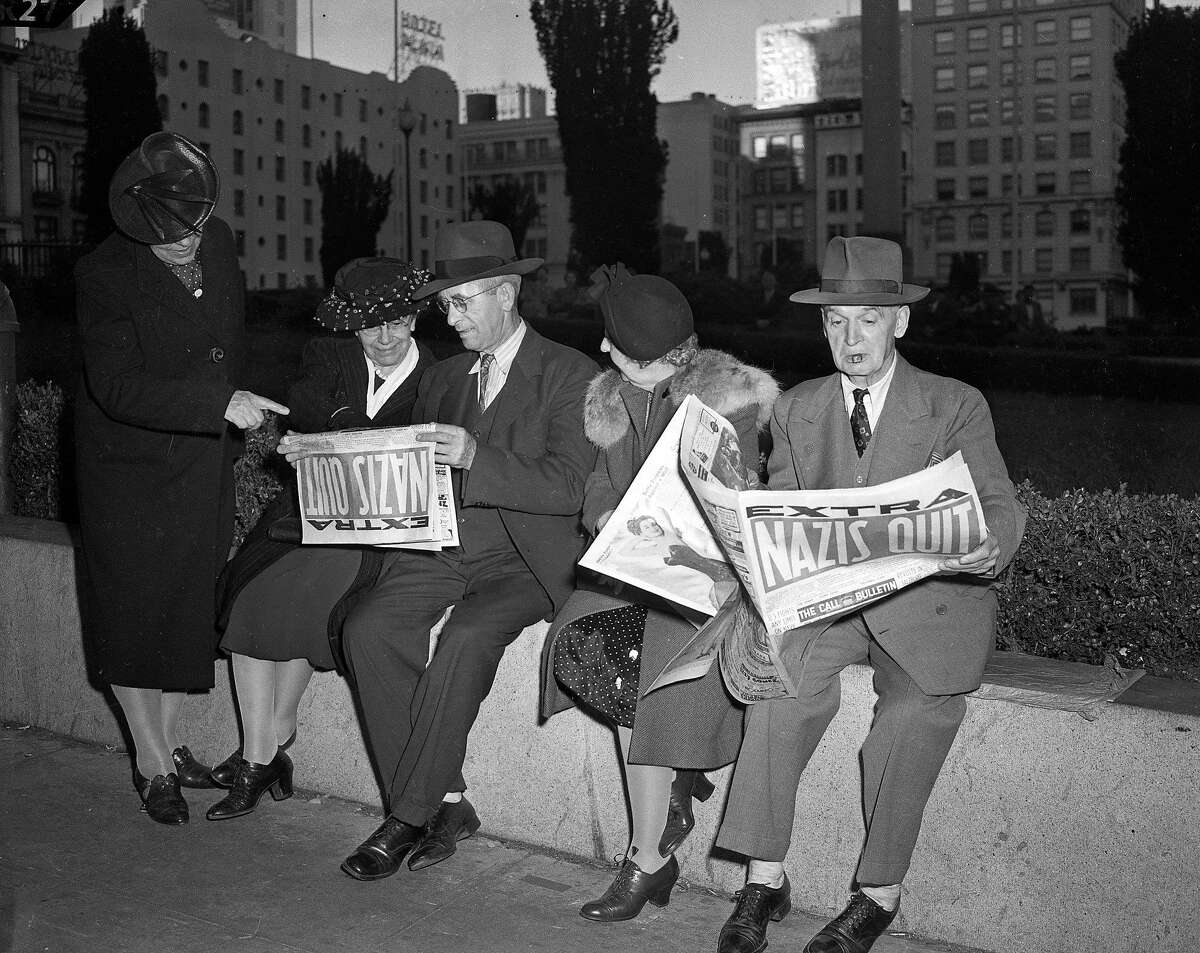
Virginia de Carvalho, Five People in Union Square with Newspapers Announcing Victory in Europe, May 8, 1945

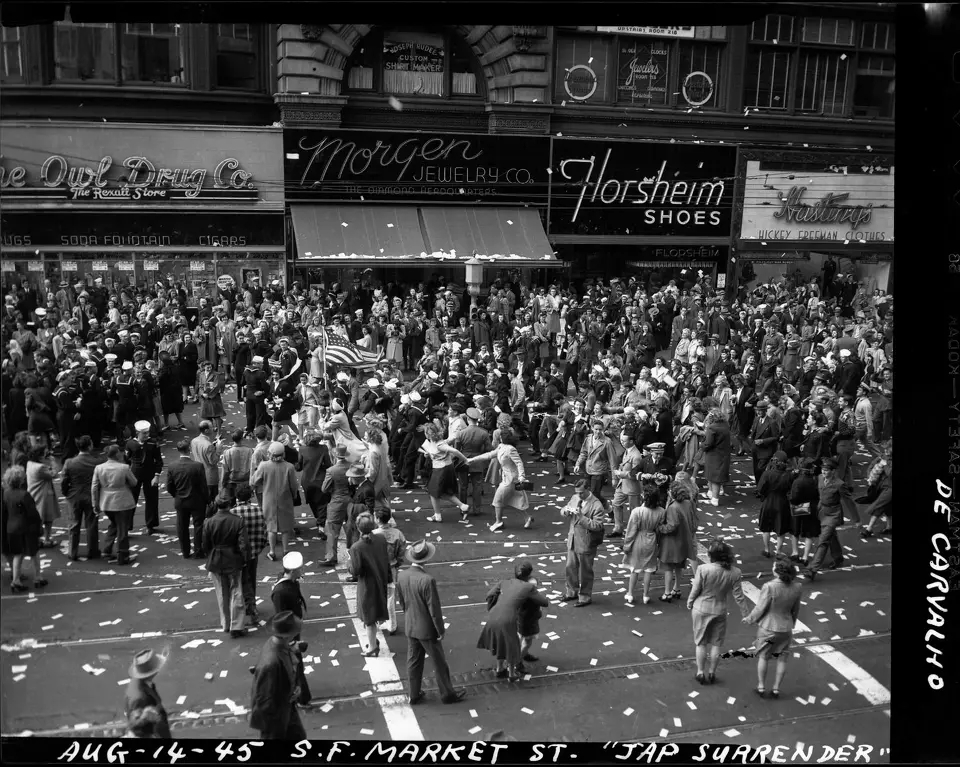
Virginia de Carvalho, Crowds Celebrating V-J Day on Market Street, August 14, 1945

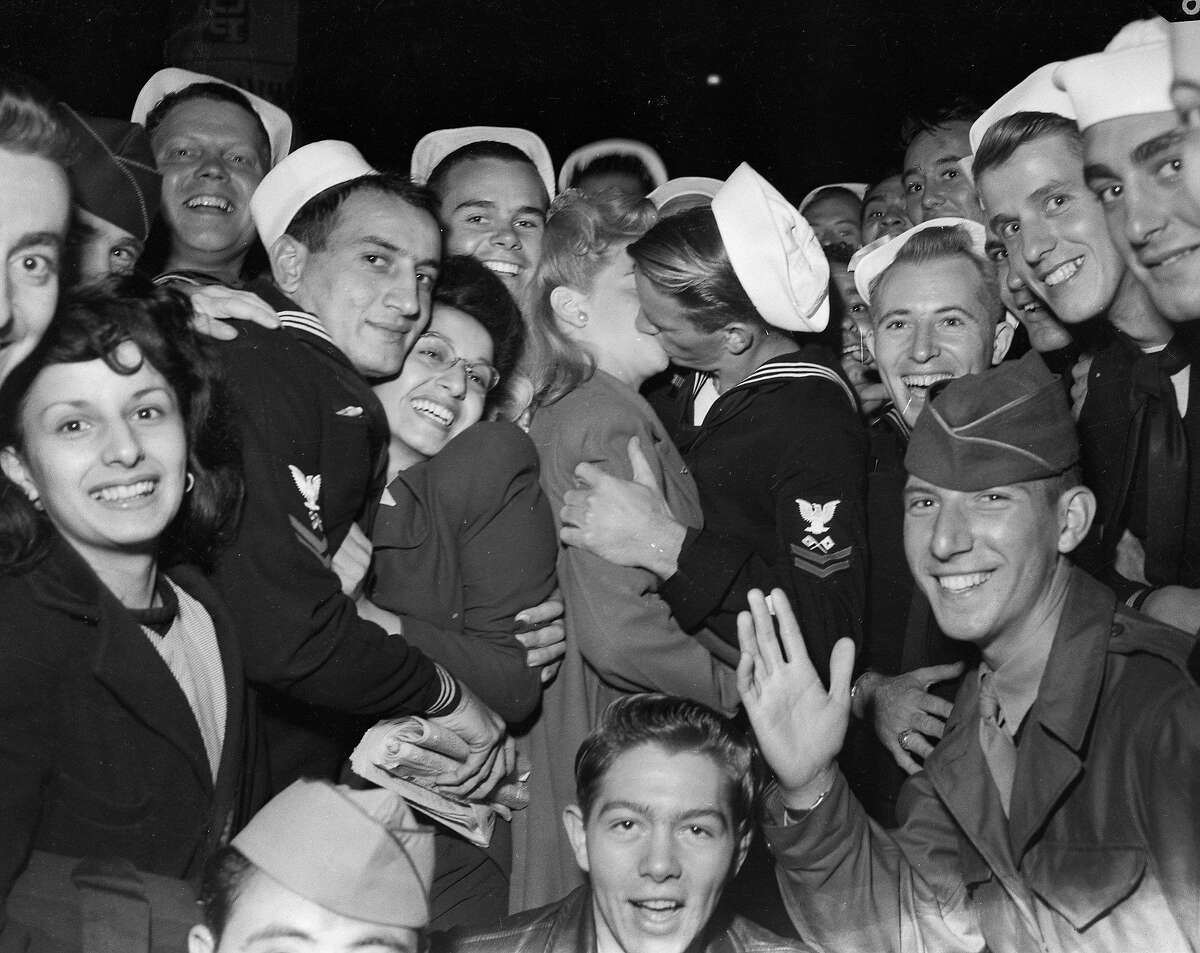
Virginia de Carvalho, Sailors and Others Celebrating V-J Day, August 14, 1945

When she was 13, de Carvalho received recognition from an organization that promoted drawing in schools. She and two other students in the Convent of the Sacred Heart received prizes for work they had submitted to the annual exhibition held by the Royal Drawing Society in London. She became a member of a local group called the Chinese Caricaturist Club, and in 1933 contributed a political cartoon to an American-owned English-language newspaper called the Shanghai Evening Post & Mercury. The cartoon showed personifications of Japan, France, Britain, and the USSR angling in Far Eastern waters for fish labeled as Manchuria and other large sections of Chinese territory. Seated next to them, Uncle Sam throws back a fish labeled Philippines.

In 1937 Japan took over the Chinese-occupied parts of the city in the Battle of Shanghai but did not then occupy the International Settlement. Sometime between that year and the departure of the British garrison in 1940, the de Carvalho family moved to California. In 1940 de Carvalho was living with her mother and younger brother in San Francisco. A year later she found work in a low-level position at the San Francisco Chronicle when one of the paper's copy boys joined the military, and in 1943 she became a staff photographer when two of its members were drafted. She covered local news events, such as a pedestrian hit by a speeding car, sports events, including baseball games and golf tournaments, and cultural events, such as an orchestra rehearsal conducted by Sir Thomas Beecham.

She showed a flair for lighting and composition in a 1945 close-up portrait of violinist Yehudi Menuhin and she showed skill in depicting sharp contrasts in a high-vantage scene of crowds on San Francisco's Ocean Beach overlooked by a surveillance airship.

She gained a reputation for the aggressive tactics she sometimes used to get dramatic pictures, as when, by one account, she "slithered her 5-foot frame under the ropes [of a boxing ring while a fight was in progress], set up her camera for a better shot, and was dragged out of the ring by her feet."

De Carvalho appeared at the center of a Chronicle photo taken in the aftermath of a munitions explosion in 1944. The image shows her with much the same equipment and clothing as the other photographers in the scene.

The Chronicle assigned de Carvalho to cover the Market Street area during San Francisco's V-E and V-J Day celebrations. The Associated Press later gave her an award for this work.

The paper discharged de Carvalho in 1946 when some of its staff photographers returned from military service. She started a portrait studio in San Francisco but soon fell ill, and on December 11 of that year, she died.

== Experience as a woman in an overwhelmingly masculine profession ==
After her death, journalists described de Carvalho as "the west coast's first woman newspaper photographer" and as "the first woman press photographer in San Francisco". During her career, women photojournalists could be tagged as "petticoat photographers". Routinely called "girls", they were treated as curiosities in a male profession. An article on de Carvalho's work at the Chronicle says the paper's sports columnists "gleefully mocked her, sometimes writing more about de Carvalho than the actual event." When she was assigned to photograph a rehearsal of the San Francisco Symphony Orchestra, the guest conductor, Sir Thomas Beecham, mistook her for a girl and directed management to "get rid of the cute little pest" A Chronicle article about the ejection was titled "She Plays a Mighty Mean Camera".

== Personal life and family ==
De Carvalho was born on February 15, 1917, in Hong Kong. Her father was Arthur Alfred de Carvalho (1890–1969), a dental surgeon, head of a Shanghai import-export concern, and also an amateur painter and photographer. Her mother was Alice Lorraine Faraday Carvalho (1890–1952). Arthur de Carvalho had been born in Hong Kong and was of Portuguese ancestry. Alice de Carvalho had been born and raised in San Francisco. Arthur de Carvalho's import-export business dealt almost exclusively with San Francisco, and Alice Carvalho's father was de Carvalho's representative in San Francisco. He also ran his own import business. Arthur and Alice were married in 1915 in Yokohama.

De Carvalho had a sister, Juanita, born in 1919, and a brother, George, born in 1921.

While living in Shanghai, she participated in polo tournaments as a member of a riding club, the Columbia and Great Western Riding Academy.

In the mid-1930s, her parents divorced. After moving to California, de Carvalho, then working in advertising, helped support her mother, who was then working as a hotel maid. A British subject by birth, de Carvalho became a US citizen when her mother was naturalized in 1936. In 1944 her parents remarried in San Francisco. When she died in 1946, de Carvalho was living in a small town north of San Francisco called Tiburon. Her remains were buried in Saint Mary Cemetery (Oakland, California).
