= Barbara Meislin =

American author and singer

Barbara Meislin (known as the Purple Lady of Tiburon) is an American author and singer, known in the town of Tiburon, California, for her devotion to things colored purple.

== Biography ==
Meislin was born to a single mother in Newark, New Jersey, in approximately 1936. She trained as a teacher at Hunter College, taught high school and adult education French and Spanish in Tiburon. After learning guitar as an adult she became an "accomplished" singer, taught the instrument at Dominican College, had a radio show on KQED playing French music, and played local restaurants, singing in French, Hebrew, and English. She divorced her husband, Jerry Meislin, on amicable terms in 1982.

In October 2009, the large purple house where she had lived for 43 years, a local landmark, burned down.

== Career ==
She wrote and self-published the book, No One Can Ever Steal Your Rainbow, as well as a song by that name, on the occasion of the death of her daughter, Lori, from a rare childhood virus. The title was taken from a comment by her rabbi, who was consoling her after her purple mailbox was stolen (it was later returned). The book was later adapted as a ballet that premiered at the Marin Dance Theater.

== Charitable work ==
Meislin is also known for her charitable work. She has supported the construction of a hospice library, a "Purple Playground of Friendship" for both Jewish and Palestinian children in Neve Shalom / Wahat al-Salam near Latrun, Israel, a "Positively Purple for the Breast Cancer" fashion show and fundraiser, She also donated a gazebo for a local park.
