= Rancho Corte Madera del Presidio =

Mexican land grant in California

Coordinates: 37.930°N 122.520°W

Rancho Corte Madera del Presidio was a 7,845-acre (31.75 km^{2}) Mexican land grant in present day Marin County, California given in 1834 by Governor José Figueroa to John (Juan) Reed. Corte Madera del Presidio means the "lumber mill of the Presidio". The grant encompassed what is now southern Corte Madera, Mill Valley, the Tiburon Peninsula, and Strawberry Point. It reached from Point Tiburon to Larkspur Creek, then known as Arroyo Holon.

== History ==
John Thomas Reed (1805 - 1843), a native of Dublin, Ireland, came to San Francisco in 1826 and the one square league grant was made to him in 1834. In 1836, John Reed married Hilaria Sánchez (1817 -1872) who was the sister of alcaldes Francisco Sanchez and José de la Cruz Sánchez. Reed was the founder of the sawmill that gave Mill Valley its name. Reed served as administrator of the Mission San Rafael Arcángel from 1836 to 1837. He then set out to build a larger house, in what is now Mill Valley, but died in 1843, at the age of 38, before his house was finished. After Reed's death, Hilaria Sanchez married Bernardino Garcia in 1843.

With the cession of California to the United States following the Mexican-American War, the 1848 Treaty of Guadalupe Hidalgo provided that the land grants would be honored. As required by the California Land Act of 1851, a claim for Rancho Corte Madera del Presidio was filed with the Public Land Commission in 1852. The Land Commission confirmed only 4,460 acres (18.0 km^{2}) in 1856, and squatters occupied some of the land. After several lawsuits, the grant was patented for 7,845 acres (31.7 km^{2}) to the heirs of John Reed in four equal undivided parts in 1885.

== Historic sites of the Rancho ==
- Benjamin and Hilarita Lyford House. The house of Reed's daughter, Hilarita, and her husband Dr. Benjamin F. Lyford, built in 1876 and now located in Tiburon, is listed on the National Register of Historic Places.
- Lyford's Stone Tower. Built about 1889 for Dr. Benjamin F. Lyford, retired inventor, physician and scientist, as the gateway to the southern portion of his Utopian tract, "Hygeia, or goddess of Health". It is listed on the National Register of Historic Places.
- Sawmill. The first sawmill in Marin County, erected by John Reed about 1834, is registered as a California Historical Landmark.

== See also ==
- Ranchos of California
- List of Ranchos of California
