= Congregation Kol Shofar =

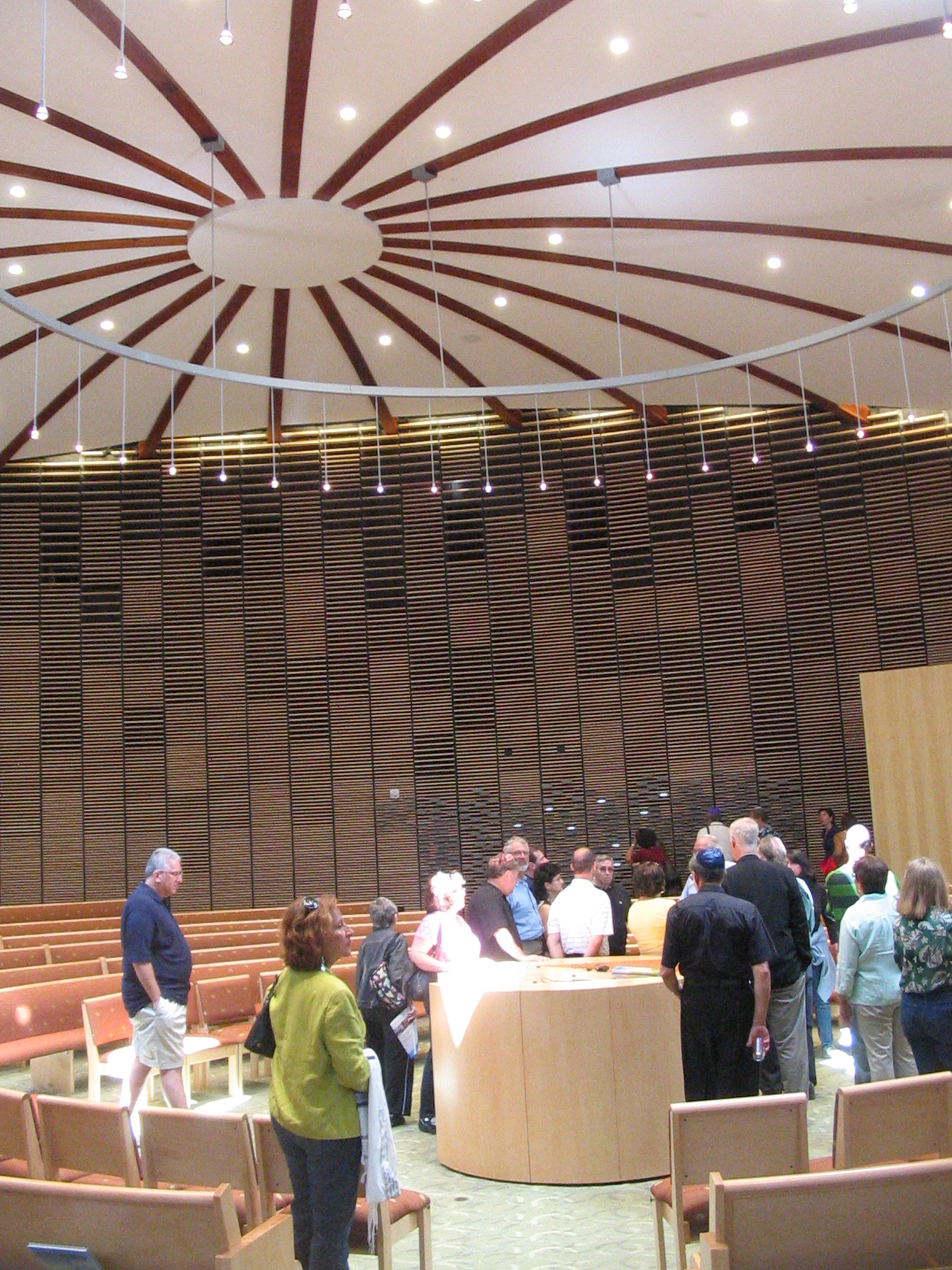
- Kol Shofar's sanctuary space

- Location in San Francisco Bay Area

Religion
- Affiliation: Conservative Judaism
- Ecclesiastical or organizational status: Synagogue
- Leadership: Rabbi Paul Steinberg
- Status: Active

Location
- Location: 215 Blackfield Drive, Tiburon, Marin County, California
- Country: United States
- Interactive map of Congregation Kol Shofar
- Coordinates: 37.90435°N 122.501893°W

Architecture
- Established: 1962 (as a congregation); 1984 (in current location)
- Completed: 2010

Website
- kolshofar.org

Congregation Kol Shofar is a Conservative synagogue founded in 1962 and located in Tiburon, Marin County, California, in the United States. The congregation is led by Rabbi Paul Steinberg, who was ordained by the Ziegler School of Rabbinic Studies.

== History ==
In the 1960s and 1970s, Kol Shofar was a nomadic congregation, meeting in various locations around Marin County. In 1984 it acquired its current location at 215 Blackfield Drive in Tiburon. The Blackfield location was previously home to Reedland Woods Middle School from 1970 to 1976.

=== Expansion ===
In 2006, Kol Shofar submitted plans to expand its synagogue space. The Tiburon Neighborhood Coalition opposed the construction, citing the traffic and noise impact due to the size of a new multi-purpose room and a proposed 27 additional events with up to 250 persons. That summer, the Tiburon Planning Commission rejected the expansion plans, claiming that Kol Shofar refused to engage in compromise discussions. As a result of the Planning Commission's rejection, the issue was brought to the attention of the town council who later that year approved a reduced synagogue expansion plan with restrictions on hours, parking, and number of events, as well as reducing the size of the social hall by 15 percent. Kol Shofar argued that Tiburon's restrictions would violate the federal Religious Land Use and Institutionalized Persons Act (RLUIPA), which prohibits "substantial burdens" on the exercise of religion by government regulations. The Becket Fund for Religious Liberty threatened litigation on behalf of Kol Shofar depending on the outcome. Both Tiburon and Kol Shofar were sued by the Coalition in March 2007, alleging environmental and land-use violations.

In 2008, a Marin Superior Court judge ruled in favor of the expansion, and the Coalition filed an appeal with the 1st District Court of Appeal. The appeal was ultimately dropped later that same year, and Kol Shofar was able to proceed, agreeing not to seek repayment of court costs.

=== Construction ===
Construction on the new space began in April 2009. The congregation held services in neighboring Westminster Presbyterian Church from February 8, 2009 until August 27, 2010. On August 27, 2010, the congregation held its first Shabbat services in its renovated sanctuary. The next day Kol Shofar held a reopening celebration. Members of the San Francisco Bay Area Jewish community were in attendance. The project costed $17.5 million, adding a brand new 8,300-square-foot (770 m^{2}) social hall, additional parking, and four class rooms, as well as a renovated sanctuary space. Herman Coliver Locus Architecture of San Francisco designed the project.

== Clergy ==
The following individuals have served as rabbis for the congregration:

- Rabbi Daniel B. Kohn
- Rabbi Jacob Milgrom ( - 1975)
- Rabbi Aryeh Wineman (1975 – 1977)
- Rabbi David White (1977 – 1991)
- Rabbi Lavey Darby (1991 – 2010)
- Rabbi Chai Levy (2002 – 2018)
- Rabbi Susan Leider (2012 – 2022)
- Rabbi Paul Steinberg (since 2017)

== Gallery ==
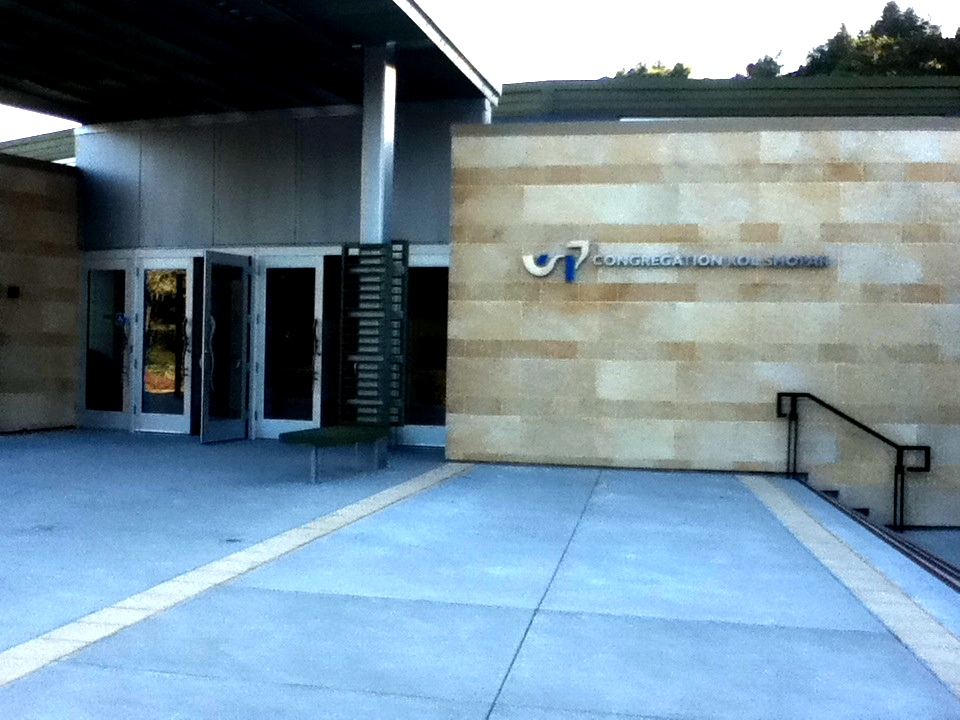
The facade of the Kol Shofar synagogue

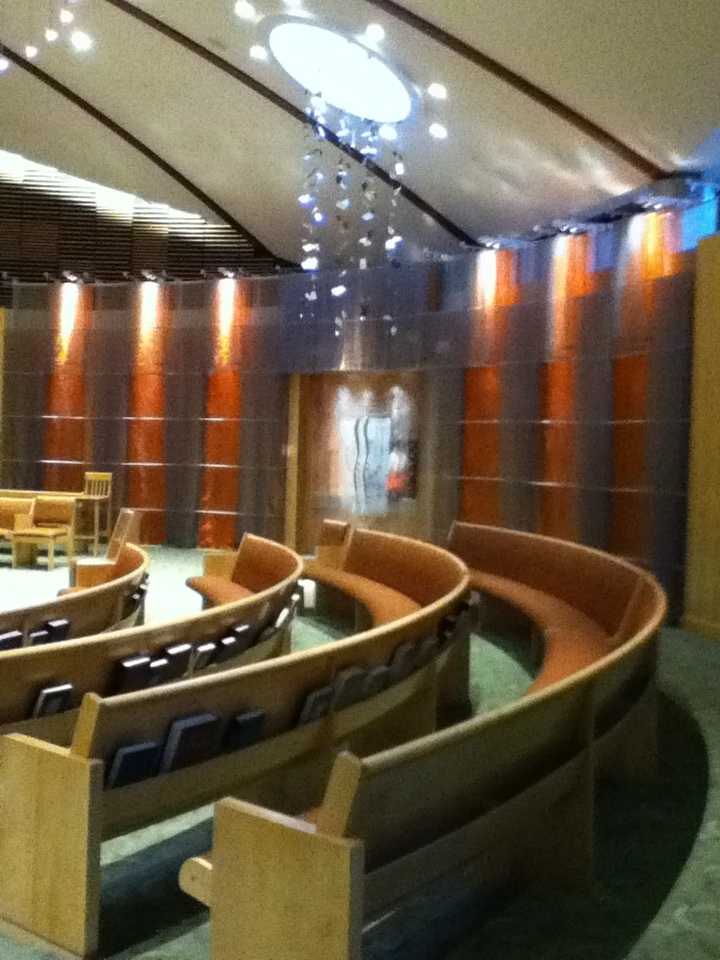
Kol Shofar's sanctuary facing the Ark and Ner Tamid
