= John Reed (early Californian) =

Irish settler to the US

John Thomas Reed
- Born: 1805; Dublin, Ireland
- Died: 1843; Corte Madera, Alta California
- Cause of death: Bled to death
- Known for: Building a saw mill in Mill Valley

John Thomas Reed (born 1805, Dublin, Ireland; died 1843, California) was an early California European settler who was the grantee of Rancho Corte Madera del Presidio in what is now Marin County, California.

== Life ==
Reed went to Acapulco, Mexico in 1820 to apply for a land grant. In 1826, he arrived in Yerba Buena (later named San Francisco). While awaiting his land grant, he established a San Francisco Bay ferry service using a sailboat.

In 1834, the governor of Alta California José Figueroa granted Rancho Corte Madera del Presidio to Reed. The grant encompassed what is now southern Corte Madera, the Tiburon Peninsula, and Strawberry Point. A large central portion of the Tiburon peninsula is presently known as Ring Mountain, most of which is in public ownership and is habitat for a diverse set of native biota.

Reed constructed the first sawmill in Marin County in 1834. The mill cut wood for the San Francisco Presidio. He also raised cattle and horses and had a brickyard and stone quarry. Reed also did brisk businesses in hunting, skins, tallow, and other products until his death in 1843.

== Family ==
In 1836, John Reed married Hilaria Sánchez (1817–1872) who was the daughter of the commandant of the Presidio and the sister of alcaldes Francisco Sanchez and José de la Cruz Sánchez. The four children of John and Hilaria Reed were: John Joseph (1837–1899) who married Carlotta Saurez; Hilarita (1839–1908) who married Benjamin Lyford (1841–1906); Maria Inez who married Thomas Boileau Deffebach (1822–1884); and Ricardo who died as a child. Hilaria Sanchez married Bernardino Garcia after Reed's death in 1843.

== See also ==
- Ring Mountain (California)
- Benjamin and Hilarita Lyford House
