= Sausalito Library =

Public library in California, United States

Coordinates: 37°51′35.30″N 122°29′20.00″W

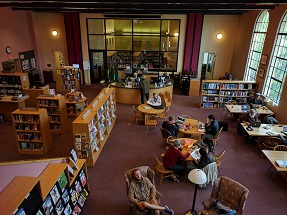
The Sausalito Library

The Sausalito Library is a public library serving the City of Sausalito and environs in Marin County, California. The library opened in 1974 at its present location at 420 Litho Street in Sausalito (inside City Hall). The library collection consists of over 45,000 items. Services offered include programs for adults and children, internet access, online databases, downloadable e-books and e-audiobooks, museum passes, and assistance with downloading library e-books onto personal devices. The library is a member of the Marin Automated Resources and Information Network (MARINet), a consortium of publicly funded libraries in Marin County. Jeffrey Jackson is the current City Librarian.

== Building History ==
The Sausalito Public Library was founded in 1906 by Father John Valentini and the Reverend George Maxwell on the second floor of the Sausalito Land & Ferry Company building on Bridgeway. In 1909 the Library was moved to 733 Bridgeway where it was expanded by stages to fill the entire second floor of the old City Hall. It remained there for the next sixty years. Although redeemed by the delightful bay view, the Library became increasingly crowded and uncomfortable and the steep stairs made access difficult.

As the city's population grew, the library's collection and use increased. In 1964 the City Council established a library over-ride tax which existed from 1965 to 1973. In 1974, when the city purchased the old Central School building at 420 Litho Street for a Civic Center, the Library moved into the former school auditorium on a temporary basis.

Various library building schemes were explored but the plans never came to fruition. In 1976, when rising costs seemed to preclude a separate library building, the City Council, with the advice of the Library Board, decided to remodel the auditorium. MLTW/Turnbull Associates were hired as architects in July 1977 and construction began in March 1979. Expanded shelving and additional seating were provided and an elevator was installed which serves the entire building. The remodeled library, with its high ceilings and tall windows looking out to the bay, opened in September 1979.

== See also ==
- Marin County Free Library
- Belvedere Tiburon Library
