= Marin County, California =

County in California, United States

Marin County
- County
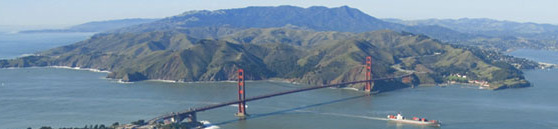
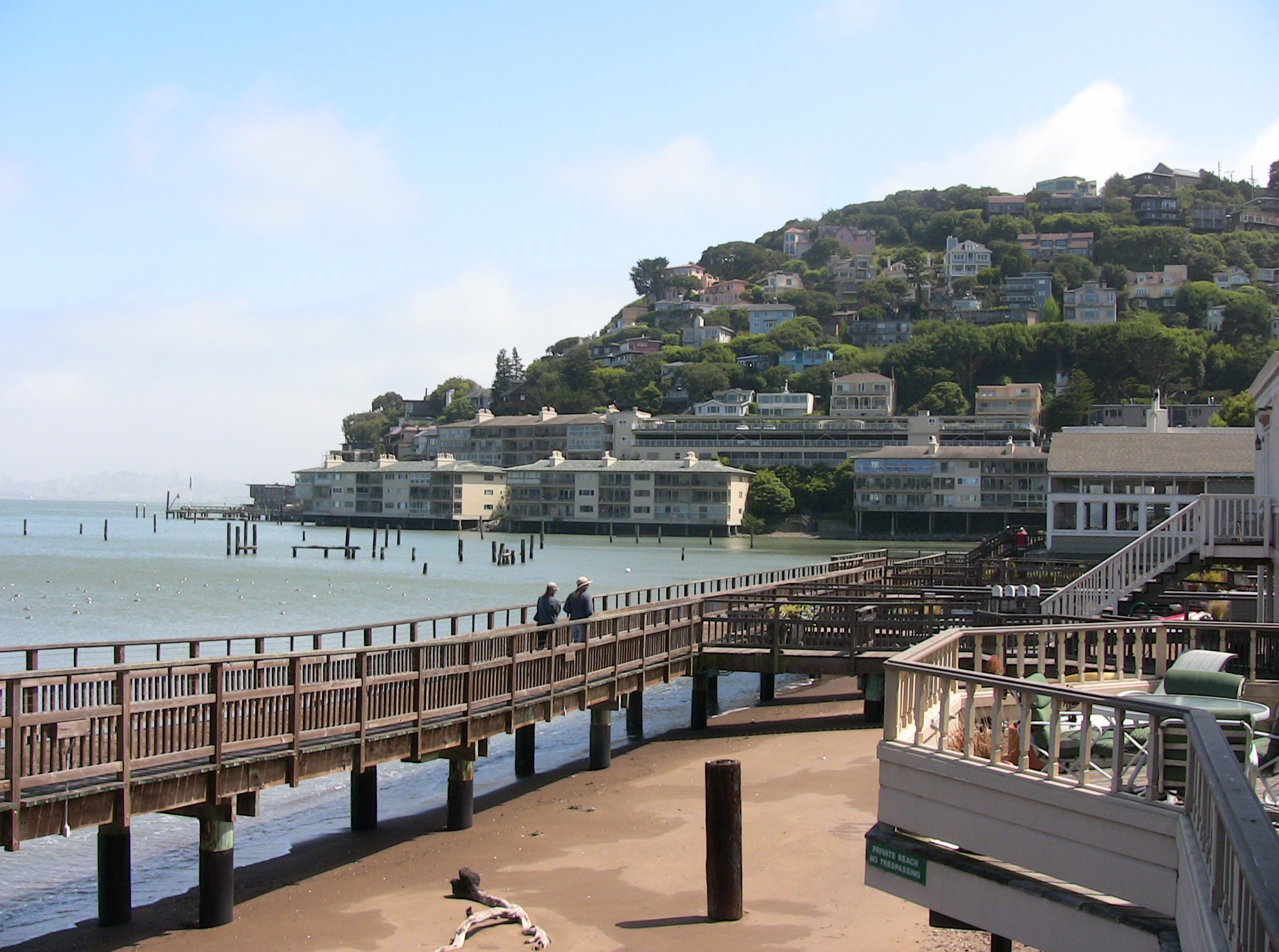
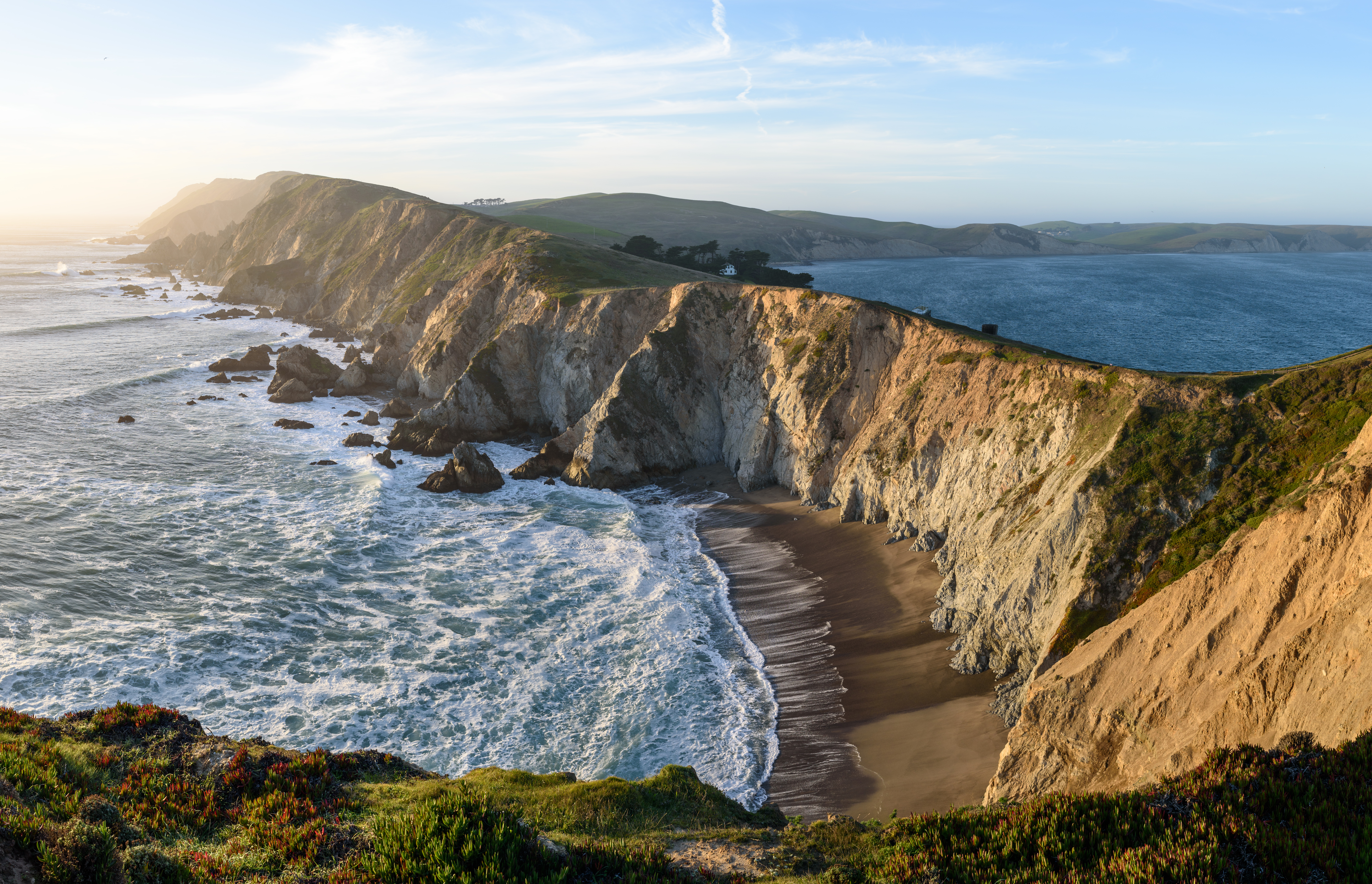
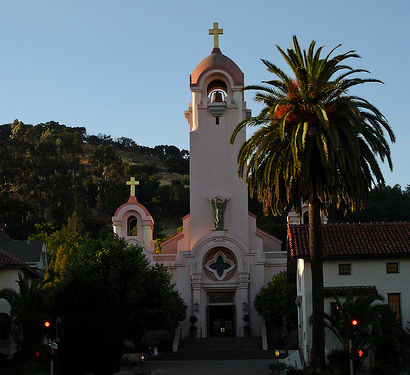
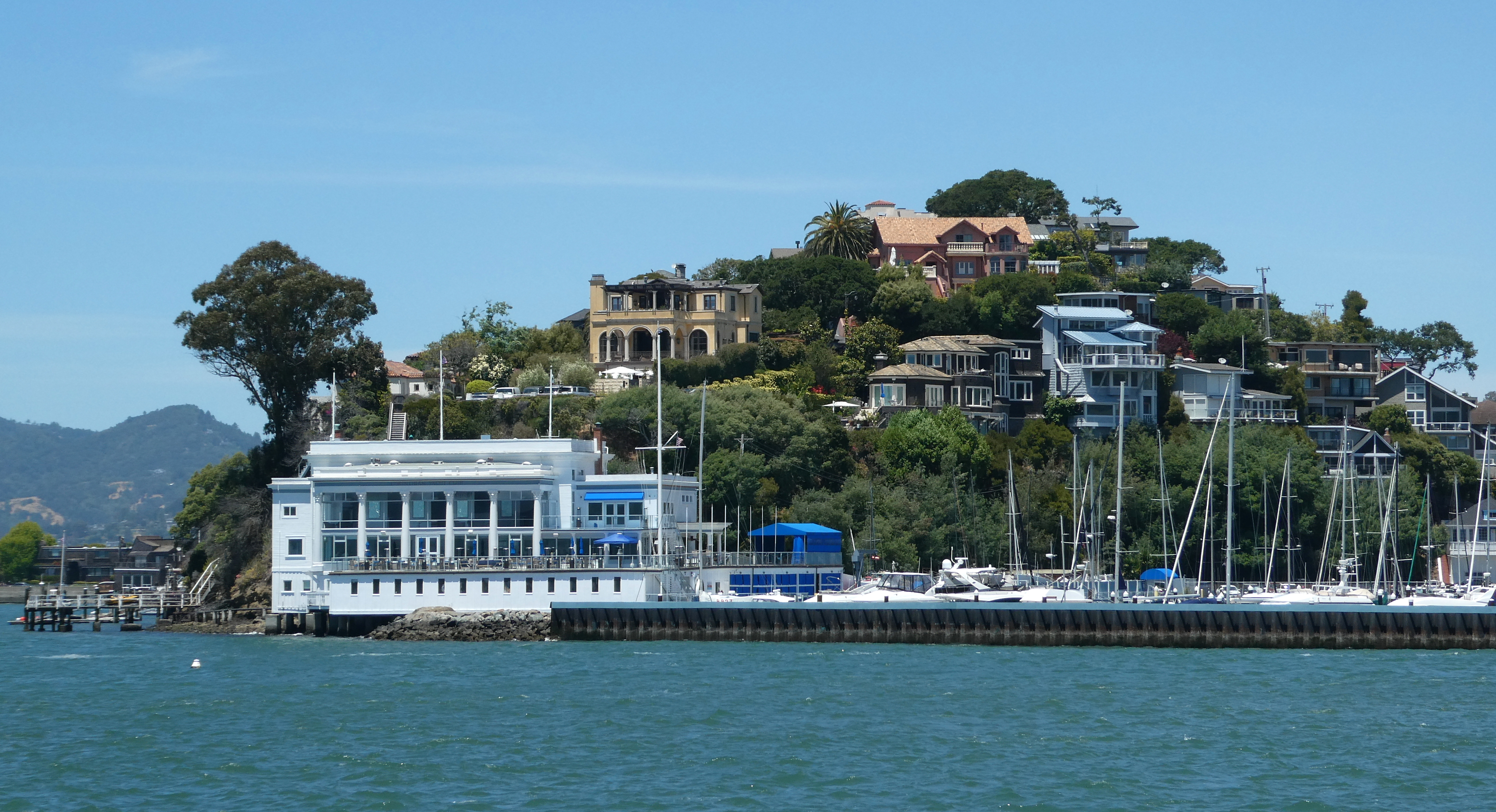
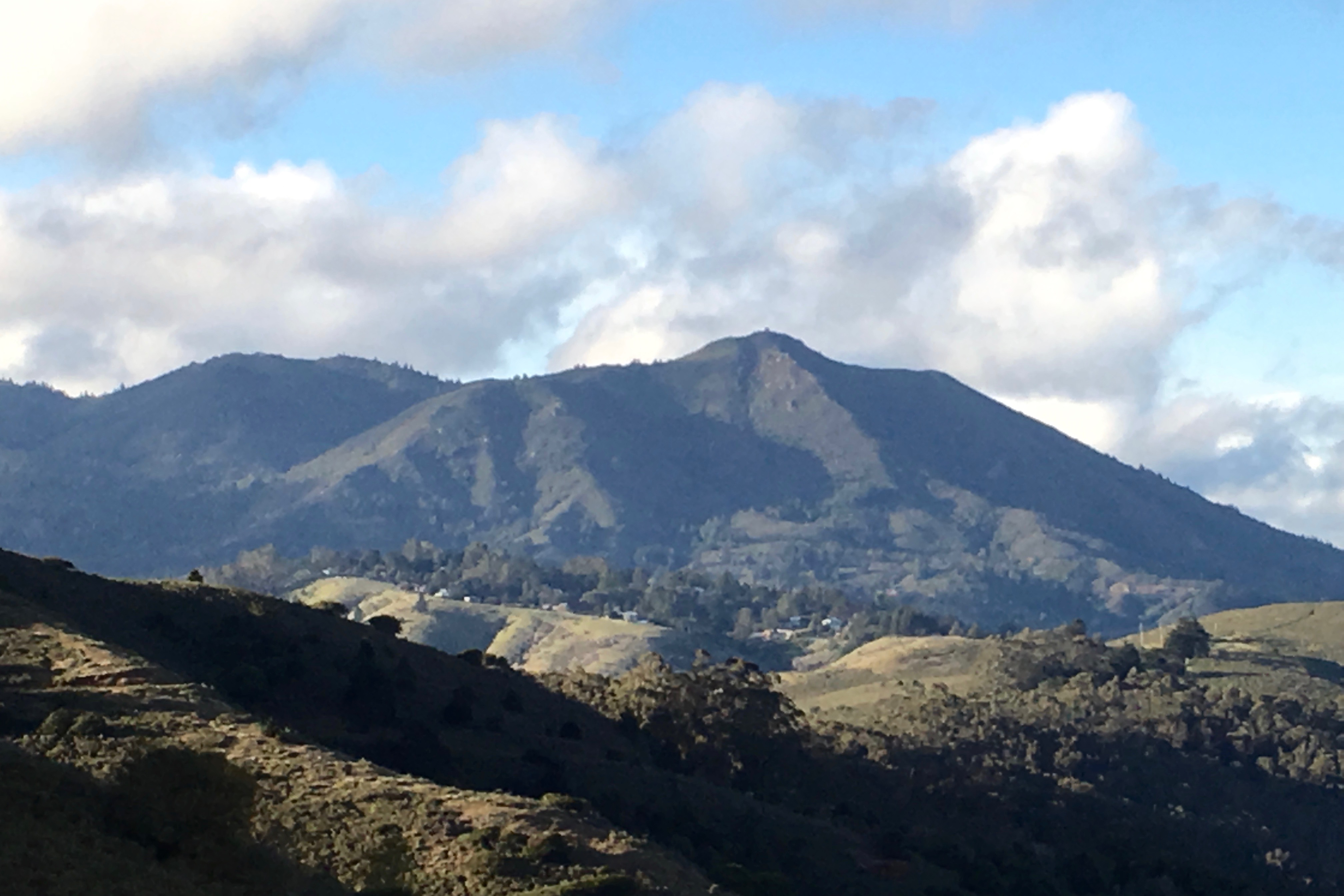
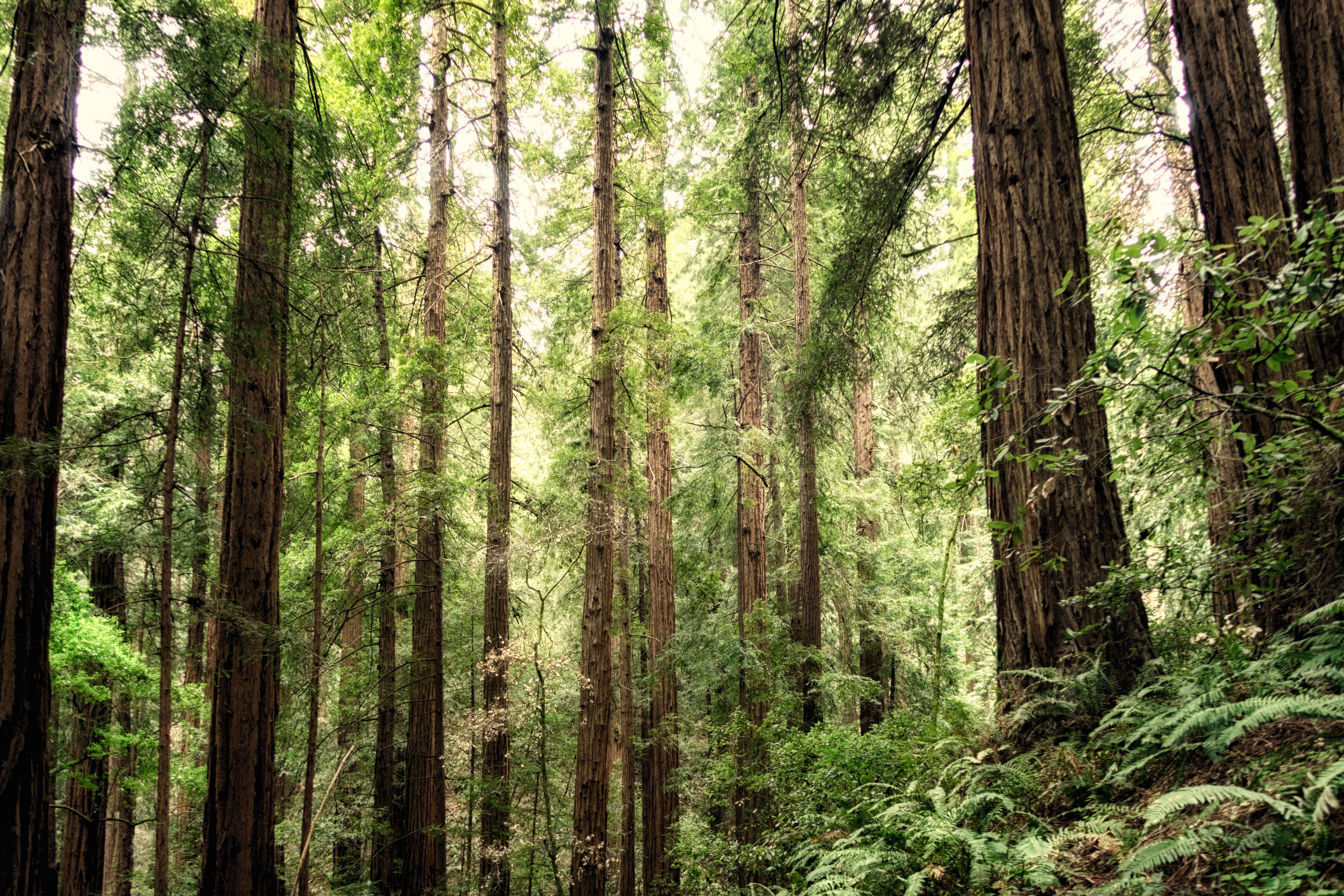
- Marin Headlands and the Golden Gate Bridge Sausalito Point Reyes San Rafael Tiburon Mt. Tamalpais Muir Woods

- Location in the state of California
- Interactive map of Marin County
- Coordinates: 38.04°N 122.74°W
- Country: United States
- State: California
- Area: San Francisco Bay
- Incorporated: February 18, 1850
- Named for: Chief Marin, "great chief of the tribe Licatiut"
- County seat: San Rafael
- Largest city: San Rafael (population) Novato (area)

Government
  - Type: Council–Administrator
  - President: Eric Lucan
  - Vice President: Stephanie Moulton-Peters
  - President Pro Tem: Brian Colbert
  - Board of Supervisors: Supervisors: Mary Sackett; Brian Colbert; Stephanie Moulton-Peters; Dennis Rodoni; Eric Lucan
  - County Executive: Derek Johnson

Area
  - Total: 828 sq mi (2,140 km^{2})
  - Land: 520 sq mi (1,300 km^{2})
  - Water: 308 sq mi (800 km^{2})
- Highest elevation: 2,574 ft (785 m)

Population (2020)
  - Total: 262,321
  - Estimate (2025): 253,694 ▼
  - Density: 504/sq mi (195/km^{2})

GDP
  - Total: $35.698 billion (2022)
- Time zone: UTC−8 (Pacific)
  - Summer (DST): UTC−7 (PDT)
- Area codes: 415 and 628, 707 (Tomales and Dillon Beach only)
- FIPS code: 06-041
- GNIS feature ID: 277285
- Congressional district: 2nd
- Website: marincounty.gov

Marin County (/məˈrɪn/ mə-RIN) is a county located in the northwestern part of the San Francisco Bay Area of the U.S. state of California. As of the 2020 census, the population was 262,321. Its county seat and largest city is San Rafael. Marin County is across the Golden Gate Bridge from San Francisco, and is included in the San Francisco–Oakland–Fremont, CA metropolitan statistical area and the San Jose–San Francisco–Oakland combined statistical area.

Marin County's natural sites include the Muir Woods redwood forest, the Marin Headlands, Stinson Beach, the Point Reyes National Seashore, and Mount Tamalpais. Marin is one of the highest-income counties by per capita income and median household income. The county is governed by the Marin County Board of Supervisors.

The Marin County Civic Center was designed by Frank Lloyd Wright and draws thousands of visitors a year to guided tours of its arch and atrium design. In 1994, a new county jail facility was embedded into the hillside nearby.

The United States' oldest cross country running event, the Dipsea Race, takes place annually in Marin County, attracting thousands of athletes. Modern mountain biking has many early origins on the slopes of Mount Tamalpais in Marin. San Quentin State Prison is located in the county.

== History ==
=== Native American settlement ===
Thousands of years ago, Coast Miwok people first populated the area today known as Marin County.

In 1770, Coast Miwok population ranged from 1,500 to 2,000, with about 600 village sites throughout the county.

In 1967, the Marin Museum of the American Indian was established, with exhibits focusing on Coast Miwok artifacts, crafts, and artwork. As of 2021, Indigenous-led events include healing drumming, dogbane cordage demonstrations, trade feasts, and traditional dancing.

=== History of Marin ===
During the Mexican-American war, areas of Marin County were seized by Americans as part of the conquest of California (1846–1847). Marin County is one of the original 27 counties of California, created February 18, 1850, following adoption of the California Constitution of 1849 and just months before the state was admitted to the Union.

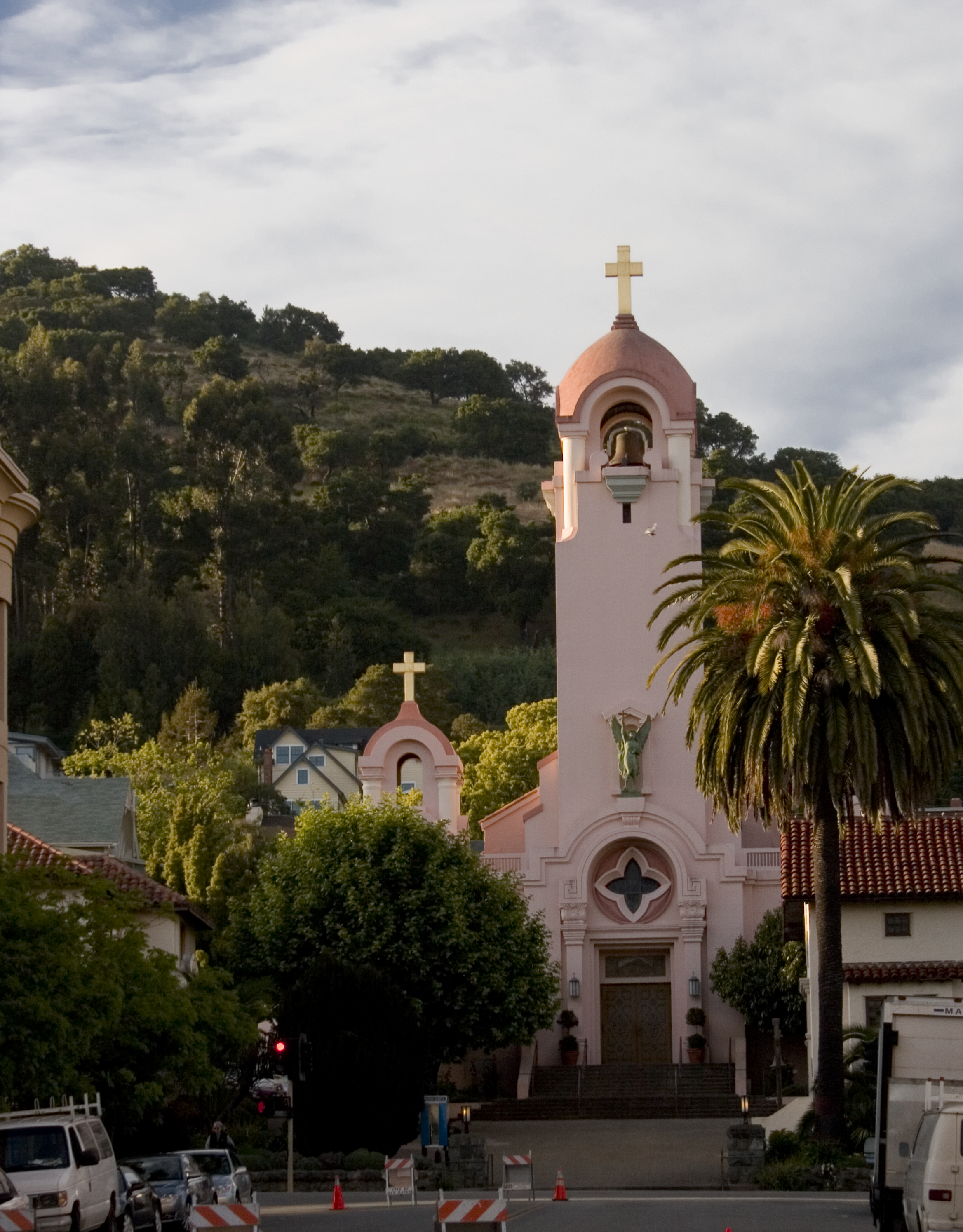
The Mission San Rafael Arcángel

According to General Mariano Vallejo, who headed an 1850 committee to name California's counties, the county was named for "Marin", great chief of the tribe Licatiut. Marin had been named "Huicmuse" until he was baptized as "Marino" at about age 20. Marin / Marino was born into the Huimen people, a Coast Miwok tribe of Native Americans who inhabited the San Rafael area. Vallejo believed that "Chief Marin" had waged several fierce battles against the Spanish. Marino definitely did reside at Mission Dolores (in modern San Francisco) much of the time from his 1801 baptism and marriage until 1817, frequently serving as a baptism witness and godfather; he may have escaped and been recaptured at some point during that time. Starting in 1817, he served as an alcalde (in effect, an overseer) at the San Rafael Mission, where he lived from 1817 off and on until his death. In 1821, Marino served as an expedition guide for the Spanish for a couple of years before escaping and hiding out for some months in the tiny Marin Islands (also named after him); his recapture resulted in a yearlong incarceration at the Presidio before his return to the Mission San Rafael area for about 15 years until his death in 1839. In 2009, a plaque commemorating Chief Marin was placed in Mill Valley.

Another version of the origin of the county name is that the bay between San Pedro Point and San Quentin Point was named Bahía de Nuestra Señora del Rosario la Marinera in 1775, and that Marin is simply an abbreviation of this name.

Francis Drake and the crew of the Golden Hind was thought to have landed on the Marin coast in 1579 claiming the land as Nova Albion. A bronze plaque inscribed with Drake's claim to the new lands, fitting the description in Drake's own account, was discovered in 1933. This so-called Drake's Plate of Brass was revealed as a hoax in 2003.

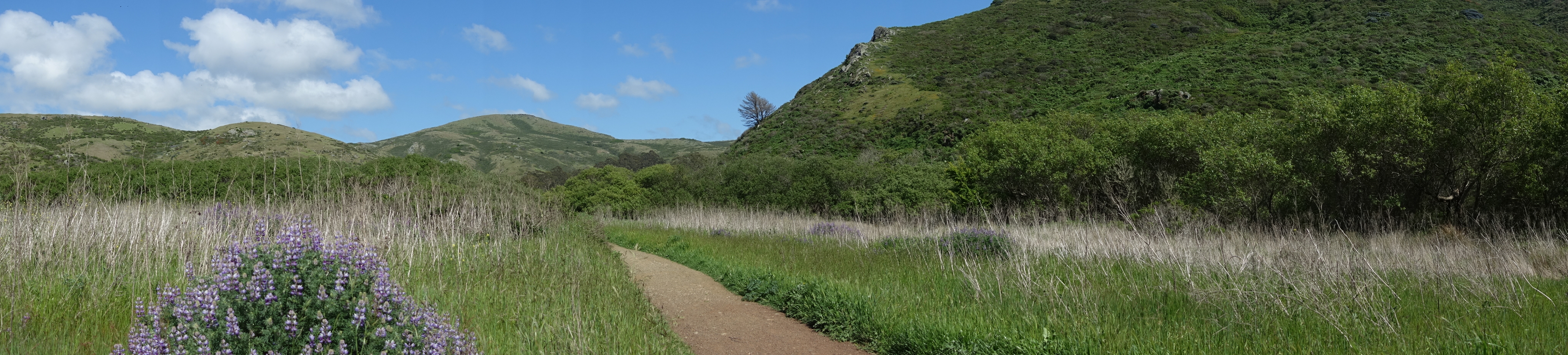
Looking east along the Tennessee Valley Trail, part of the Golden Gate National Recreation Area

In 1595, Sebastian Cermeno lost his ship, the San Agustin, while exploring the Marin Coast. The Spanish explorer Vizcaíno landed about twenty years after Drake in what is now called Drakes Bay. However the first Spanish settlement in Marin was not established until 1817 when Mission San Rafael Arcángel was founded partly in response to the Russian-built Fort Ross to the north in what is now Sonoma County. Mission San Rafael Arcángel was founded in what is now downtown San Rafael as the 20th Spanish mission in the colonial Mexican province of Alta California by four priests, Father Narciso Duran from Mission San Jose, Father Abella from Mission San Francisco de Asís, Father Gil y Taboada and Father Mariano Payeras, the President of the Missions, on December 14, 1817, four years before Mexico gained independence from Spain.

== Geography ==
According to the U.S. Census Bureau, the county has a total area of 828 square miles (2,140 km^{2}), of which 520 square miles (1,300 km^{2}) is land and 308 square miles (800 km^{2}), comprising 37.2%, is water. It is the fourth-smallest county in California by land area. According to the records at the County Assessor-Recorder's Office, as of June 2006, Marin had 91,065 acres (369 km^{2}) of taxable land, consisting of 79,086 parcels with a total tax basis of $39.8 billion. These parcels are divided into the following classifications:

Parcel Type	Tax ID	Quantity	Value
Vacant	10	6,900	$508.17 million
Single Family Residential	11	61,264	$30.13 billion
Mobile Home	12	210	$7.62 million
House Boat	13	379	$61.83 million
Multi Family Residential	14	1,316	$3.97 billion
Industrial Unimproved	40	113	$12.24 million
Industrial Improved	41	562	$482.83 million
Commercial Unimproved	50	431	$97.89 million
Commercial Improved	51	7,911	$4.52 billion

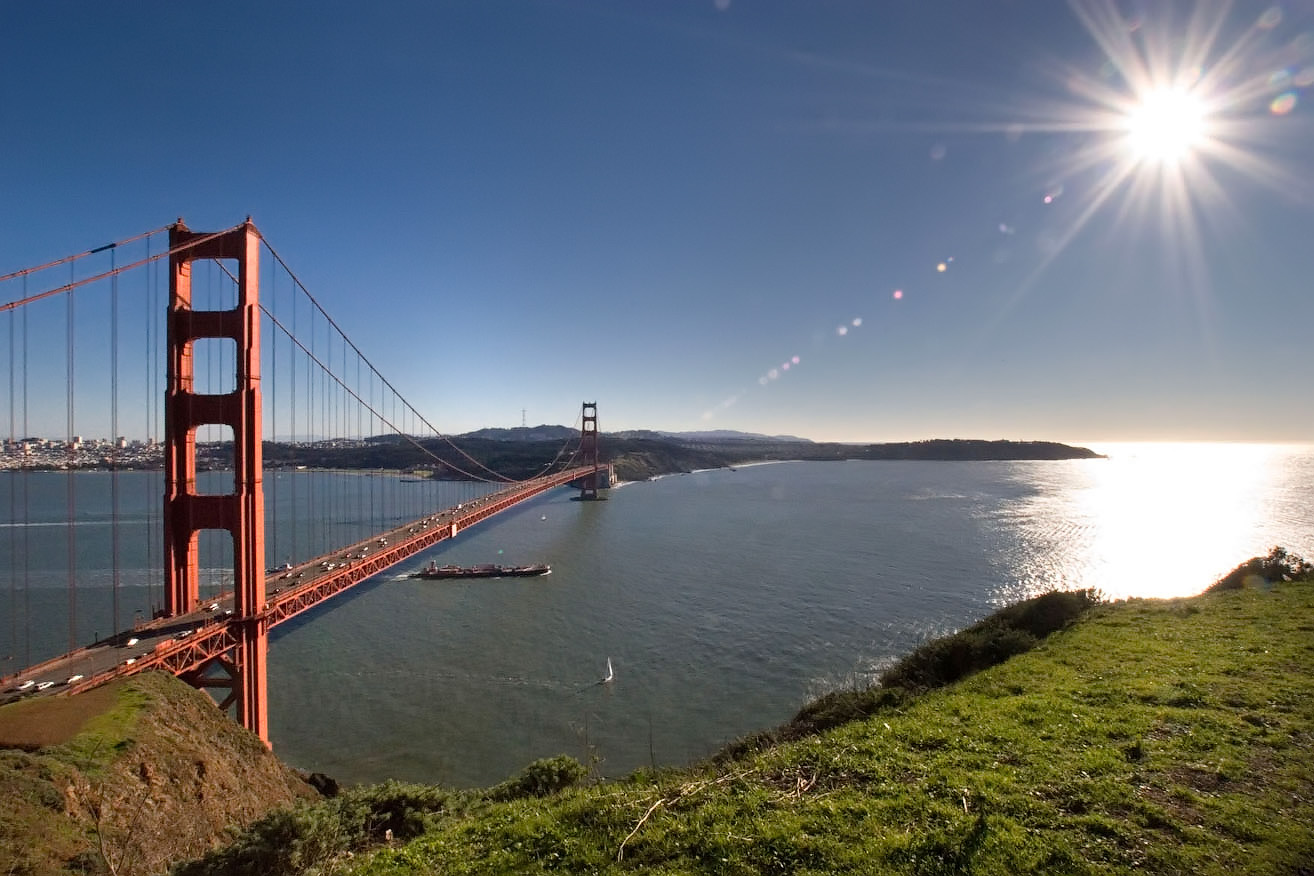
A view of the Golden Gate Bridge from the Marin Headlands

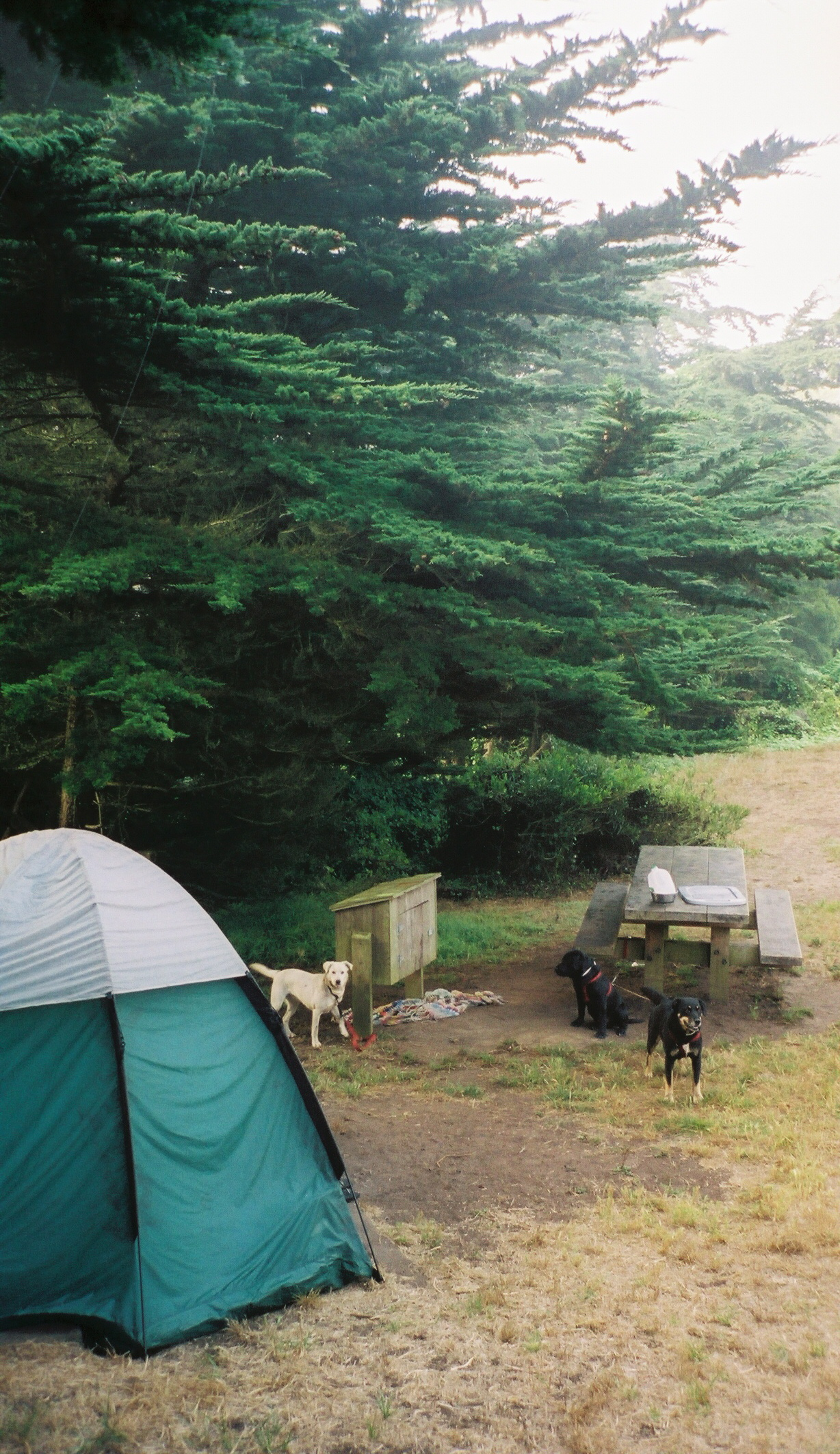
Bicentennial Campground within the Golden Gate National Recreation Area surrounding the San Francisco Bay area

Geographically, the county forms a large, southward-facing peninsula, with the Pacific Ocean to the west, San Pablo Bay, and San Francisco Bay to the east, and – across the Golden Gate – the city of San Francisco to the south. Marin County's northern border is with Sonoma County.

Most of the county's population resides on the eastern side, with a string of communities running along U.S. Route 101 and the San Francisco Bay, from Sausalito to Tiburon to Corte Madera to San Rafael and Novato. The interior contains large areas of agricultural and open space; West Marin, through which State Route 1 runs alongside the California coast, contains many small unincorporated communities whose economies depend on agriculture and tourism. West Marin has beaches which are popular destinations for surfers and tourists year-round.

Notable features of the shoreline along the San Francisco Bay include the Sausalito shoreline, Richardson Bay, the Tiburon Peninsula, Ring Mountain, and Triangle Marsh at Corte Madera. Further north lies San Quentin State Prison along the San Rafael shoreline.

=== Adjacent counties ===
- Sonoma County – north
- San Francisco – south

=== National protected areas ===
- Golden Gate National Recreation Area (part)
- Marin Islands National Wildlife Refuge
- Muir Woods National Monument
- Point Reyes National Seashore
- San Pablo Bay National Wildlife Refuge (part)
- Gulf of the Farallones National Marine Sanctuary (part)

=== State and local protected areas ===
The Marin County Department of Parks and Open Space manages numerous county parks and open spaces, including Stafford Lake County Park. The Marin Municipal Water District has 130 mi (209 km) of trails.

==== State parks ====
- Angel Island State Park
- China Camp State Park
- Mount Tamalpais State Park
- Olompali State Historic Park
- Samuel P. Taylor State Park
- Tomales Bay State Park

=== Marine protected areas ===
Like underwater parks, these marine protected areas help conserve ocean wildlife and marine ecosystems:

- Estero Americano State Marine Recreational Management Area
- Estero de San Antonio State Marine Recreational Management Area
- Point Reyes State Marine Reserve & Point Reyes State Marine Conservation Area
- Estero de Limantour State Marine Reserve & Drakes Estero State Marine Conservation Area
- Duxbury Reef State Marine Conservation Area

== Ecology ==
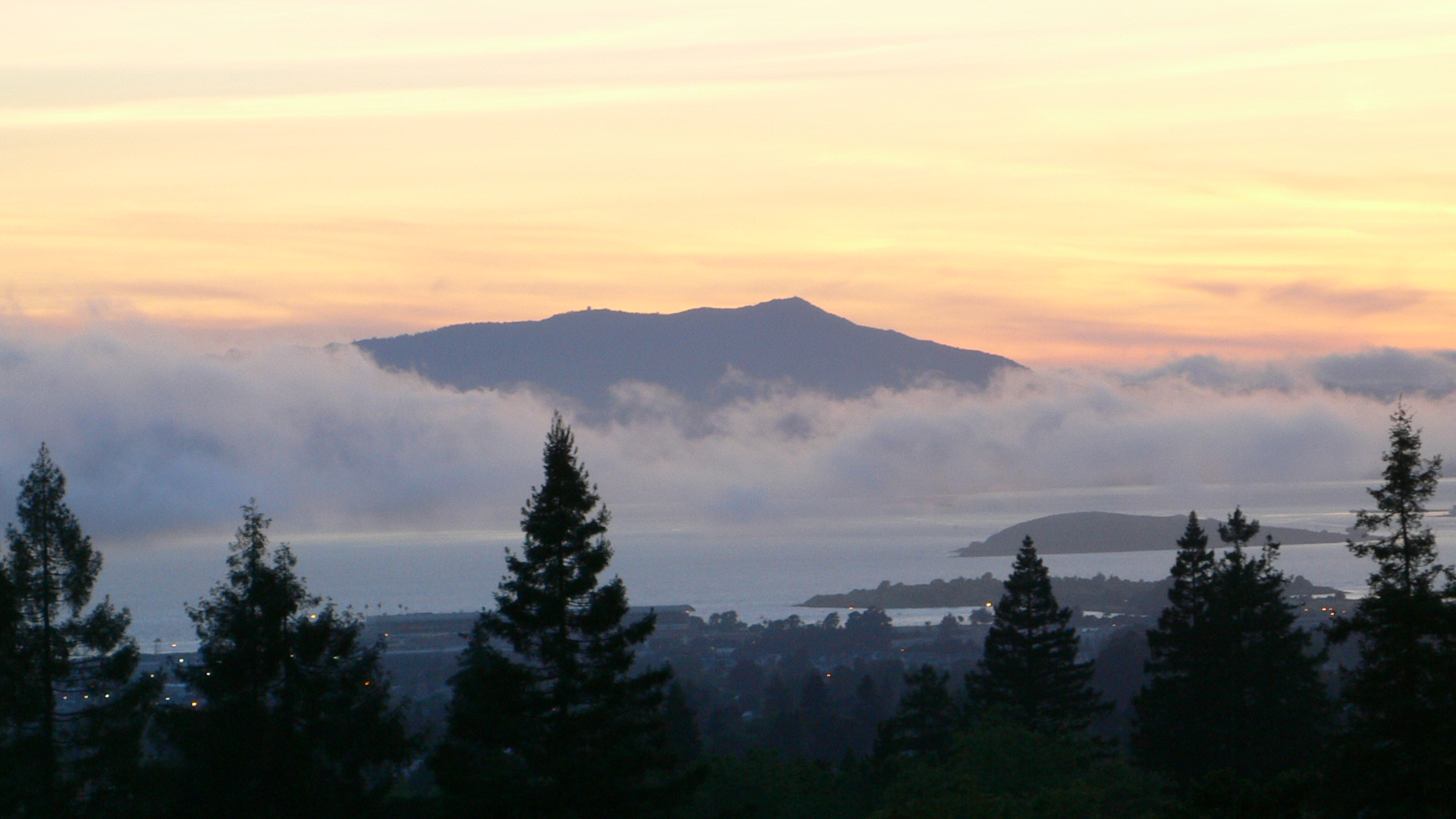
Mount Tamalpais is the highest peak in the Marin Hills and can be seen here from Berkeley in Alameda County.

Marin County is considered in the California Floristic Province, a zone of extremely high biodiversity and endemism. There are numerous ecosystems present, including Coastal Strand, oak woodland, mixed evergreen forest, and Coast Redwood Forests chaparral and riparian zones. There are also a considerable number of protected plant and animal species present: Fauna include the California red-legged frog (Rana draytonii) and California freshwater shrimp while flora include Marin Dwarf Flax, Hesperolinon congestum; Tiburon Jewelflower, Streptanthus niger; and Tiburon Indian paintbrush, Castilleja neglecta.

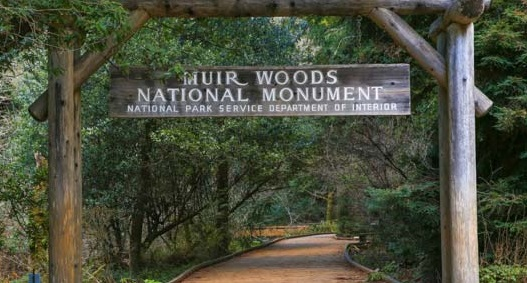
Muir Woods National Monument, which is on the Pacific coast of southwestern Marin County

A number of watersheds exist in Marin County, including Walker Creek, Lagunitas Creek, Miller Creek, and Novato Creek.

Notably, the Lagunitas Creek watershed is the southernmost stronghold for spawning runs of coho salmon (Oncorhynchus kisutch) in California. These coho are part of the "Central California Coast Evolutionarily Significant Unit, " or CCC ESU, and are listed as "endangered" at both the state and federal level. Significant efforts to protect and restore these fish have been underway in the watershed since the 1980s. Fifty percent of historical coho salmon habitat is now behind damsin Marin County. Strong efforts are also being made to protect and restore undammed, headwater reaches of the Lagunitas Creek watershed in the San Geronimo Valley, where upwards of 40% of the watershed's salmon spawn each year and where as much as 1/3 of the juvenile salmon (or fry) spend their entire freshwater lives. The "Salmon Protection and Watershed Network" (SPAWN) leads winter tours for the public to learn about and view these spawning salmon, and also leads year-round opportunities for the public to get involved in stream restoration, monitoring spawning and smolt outmigration, juvenile fish rescue and relocation in the summer, and advocacy and policy development. Despite the lack of rain in the Marin County area due to historic drought levels, in 2014, an estimated 20,000 juvenile coho salmon made the migration from their spawning grounds in the Lagunitas Creek area to the Pacific Ocean. This increase in migration was significantly up from the previous historic record for the same migration measured in 2006 at 11,000.

Around 490 different species of birds have been observed in Marin County.

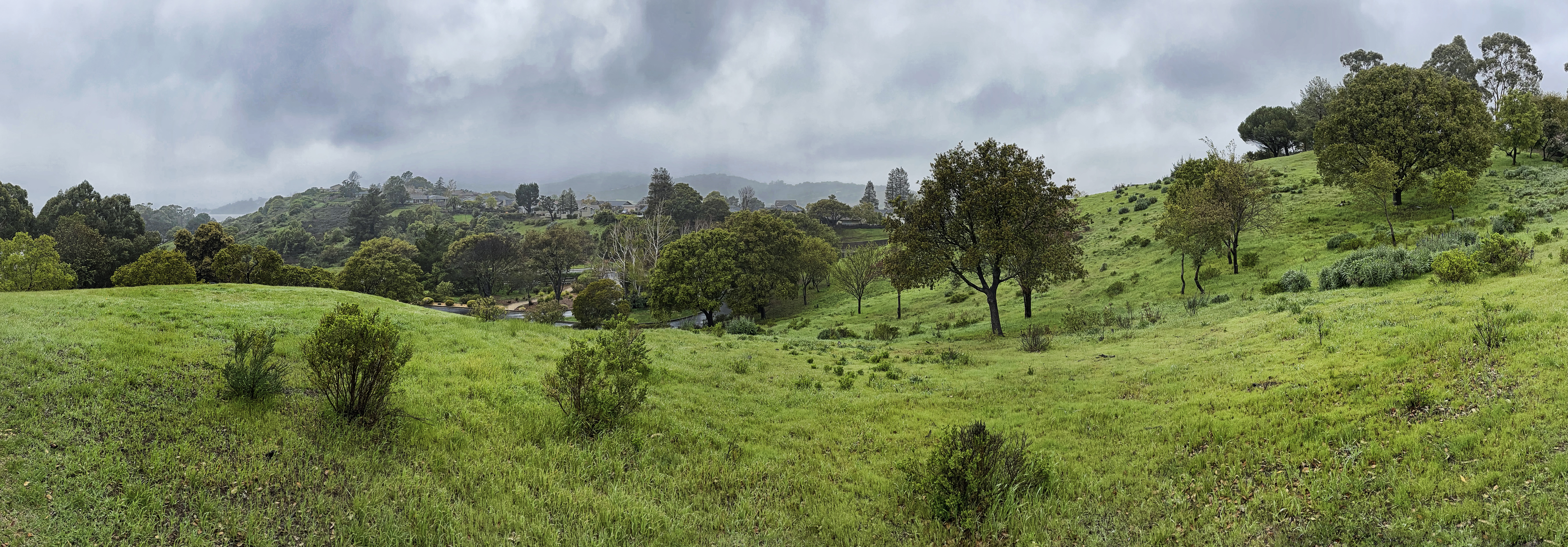
The Veench Vista - Marin County

In 2010, all of the county's beaches were listed as the cleanest in the state.

When Richard Henry Dana Jr. visited San Francisco Bay in 1835, he wrote about vast tule elk (Cervus canadensis nannodes) herds near the Golden Gate on December 27: "...we came to anchor near the mouth of the bay, under a high and beautifully sloping hill, upon which herds of hundreds and hundreds of red deer [note: "red deer" is the European term for "elk"], and the stag, with his high branching antlers, were bounding about...," although it is not clear whether this was the Marin side or the San Francisco side.

In the last decade, black bears (Ursus americanus) have re-established a foothold in Marin County.

Marin County remains the only California county north of San Francisco Bay without beaver (Castor canadensis).

== Demographics ==
Historical population
Census	Pop.	Note	%±
1850	323		—
1860	3,334		932.2%
1870	6,903		107.0%
1880	11,324		64.0%
1890	13,072		15.4%
1900	15,702		20.1%
1910	25,114		59.9%
1920	27,342		8.9%
1930	41,648		52.3%
1940	52,907		27.0%
1950	85,619		61.8%
1960	146,820		71.5%
1970	206,038		40.3%
1980	222,568		8.0%
1990	230,096		3.4%
2000	247,289		7.5%
2010	252,409		2.1%
2020	262,321		3.9%
2025 (est.)	253,694	▼	−3.3%
U.S. Decennial Census; 1790–1960 1900–1990; 1990–2000 2010 2020

=== 2020 census ===
Marin County, California – Racial and ethnic composition Note: the US Census treats Hispanic/Latino as an ethnic category. This table excludes Latinos from the racial categories and assigns them to a separate category. Hispanics/Latinos may be of any race.
Race / Ethnicity (NH = Non-Hispanic)	Pop 1980	Pop 1990	Pop 2000	Pop 2010	Pop 2020	% 1980	% 1990	% 2000	% 2010	% 2020
White alone (NH)	199,675	194,665	194,254	183,830	173,149	89.71%	84.60%	78.55%	72.83%	66.01%
Black or African American alone (NH)	5,375	7,529	6,946	6,621	6,120	2.41%	3.27%	2.81%	2.62%	2.33%
Native American or Alaska Native alone (NH)	771	661	630	531	555	0.35%	0.29%	0.25%	0.21%	0.21%
Asian alone (NH)	5,426	9,064	11,078	13,577	16,175	2.44%	3.94%	4.48%	5.38%	6.17%
Native Hawaiian or Pacific Islander alone (NH)	x	x	330	436	457	0.13%	0.17%	0.13%	0.17%	0.17%
Other race alone (NH)	2,117	247	718	1,034	2,040	0.95%	0.11%	0.29%	0.41%	0.78%
Mixed race or Multiracial (NH)	x	x	5,982	7,311	14,415	x	x	2.42%	2.90%	5.50%
Hispanic or Latino (any race)	9,204	17,930	27,351	39,069	49,410	4.14%	7.79%	11.06%	15.48%	18.84%
Total	222,568	230,096	247,289	252,409	262,321	100.00%	100.00%	100.00%	100.00%	100.00%

=== American Community Survey 2025 data ===
The United States Census Bureau estimated that in 2025, Marin County’s population was 253.694. It was also estimated that the county's population was 65,18% Non-Hispanic White, 20,54% Hispanic or Latino, 2,39% Non-Hispanic Black, 6,97% Asian, 0,20% Native American, 0,16% Pacific Islander, and 4,56% Multiracial.

Total	Population	Percentage
Non-Hispanic White	165.360	65,18%
Hispanic or Latino	52.113	20,54%
Non-Hispanic Black	6.061	2,39%
Asian	17.677	6,97%
Native American	512	0,20%
Pacific Islander	404	0,16%
Non-Hispanic Multiracial	11.567	4,56%

As of the 2020 census, the county had a population of 262,321. The median age was 46.5 years. 20.2% of residents were under the age of 18 and 22.6% of residents were 65 years of age or older. For every 100 females there were 96.2 males, and for every 100 females age 18 and over there were 93.9 males age 18 and over.

The racial makeup of the county was 68.4% White, 2.4% Black or African American, 1.5% American Indian and Alaska Native, 6.3% Asian, 0.2% Native Hawaiian and Pacific Islander, 9.9% from some other race, and 11.3% from two or more races. Hispanic or Latino residents of any race comprised 18.8% of the population.

94.0% of residents lived in urban areas, while 6.0% lived in rural areas.

There were 104,167 households in the county, of which 29.4% had children under the age of 18 living with them and 28.0% had a female householder with no spouse or partner present. About 28.6% of all households were made up of individuals and 15.6% had someone living alone who was 65 years of age or older.

There were 111,564 housing units, of which 6.6% were vacant. Among occupied housing units, 62.0% were owner-occupied and 38.0% were renter-occupied. The homeowner vacancy rate was 0.8% and the rental vacancy rate was 4.2%.

=== 2010 census ===
According to the 2010 United States census, the racial composition of Marin County was as follows:

- White: 72.8% (non-Hispanic)
- Hispanic or Latino (of any race): 15.5%
- Asian: 5.4%
- Two or more races: 2.9%
- Black: 2.6% (non-Hispanic)
- Native American: 0.2%
- Pacific Islander: 0.2%
- Other: 0.4%

=== 2000 census ===
As of the 2000 census, there were 247,289 people, 100,650 households, and 60,691 families residing in the county. The population density was 476 inhabitants per square mile (184/km^{2}). There were 104,990 housing units at an average density of 202 units per square mile (78 units/km^{2}). The racial makeup of the county was 84.0% White, 2.9% Black or African American, 0.4% Native American, 4.5% Asian, 0.2% Pacific Islander, 4.5% from other races, and 3.5% from two or more races. 11.1% of the population were Hispanic or Latino of any race.

In 2000, there were 100,650 households, out of which 27.5% had children under the age of 18 living with them, 48.4% were married couples living together, 8.5% had a female householder with no husband present, and 39.7% were non-families. 29.8% of all households were made up of individuals, and 9.6% had someone living alone who was 65 years of age or older. The average household size was 2.34 and the average family size was 2.90.

In the county, 20.3% of the population was under the age of 18, 5.5% from 18 to 24, 31.0% from 25 to 44, 29.7% from 45 to 64, and 13.5% was 65 years of age or older. The median age was 41 years. For every 100 females there were 98.2 males. For every 100 females age 18 and over, there were 96.4 males.

=== Religion ===
- Roman Catholic: 23.4%
- Protestant: 6.1%
- Mormon: 0.7%
- Other Christian: 1%
- Judaism: 1.4%
- Eastern religions: 1.4%
- Islam: 2.7%
- No religion: 63.3%

=== Place of birth ===
According to the 2006–2008 American Community Survey (ACS), 81.3% of Marin County's residents were born in the United States. Approximately 80.0% of the county's residents were born in one of the fifty states or born abroad to American parents.

Foreign-born individuals made up the remaining 18.7% of the population. Latin America was the most common birthplace of foreign-born residents; those born in Latin America made up the plurality (42.2%) of Marin County's foreign population. Individuals born in Europe were the second largest foreign-born group; they made up 25.3% of Marin County's foreign population. Immigrants from Asia made up 23.7% of the county's foreign population. Those born in other parts of North America and Africa made up 3.9% and 3.8% of the foreign-born populace respectively. Lastly, residents born in Oceania made up a mere 1.2% of Marin County's foreign population.

=== Language ===
According to the 2006–2008 ACS, English was the most commonly spoken language at home by residents over five years of age; those who spoke only English at home made up 77.1% of Marin County's residents. Speakers of non-English languages accounted for the remaining 22.9% of the population. Speakers of Spanish made up 11.7% of the county's residents, while speakers of other Indo-European languages made up 7.1% of the populace. Speakers of Asian languages and indigenous languages of the Pacific islands made up 3.4% of the population. The remaining 0.7% spoke other languages. Source:

=== Ancestry ===
According to the 2007–2009 ACS, there were 16 ancestries in Marin County that made up over 0.9% of its population each. The 16 ancestries are listed below:

- Italian: 16.2%
- German: 15.4%
- English: 13.5%
- Irish: 9.1%
- Russian: 3.6%
- Scottish: 3.5%
- French: 3.4%
- Swedish: 2.6%
- Polish: 2.3%
- Scotch-Irish: 2.3%
- American: 2.3%
- Norwegian: 2.1%
- Dutch: 1.5%
- Portuguese: 1.3%
- Danish: 1.3%
- Swiss: 0.9%

=== Income ===
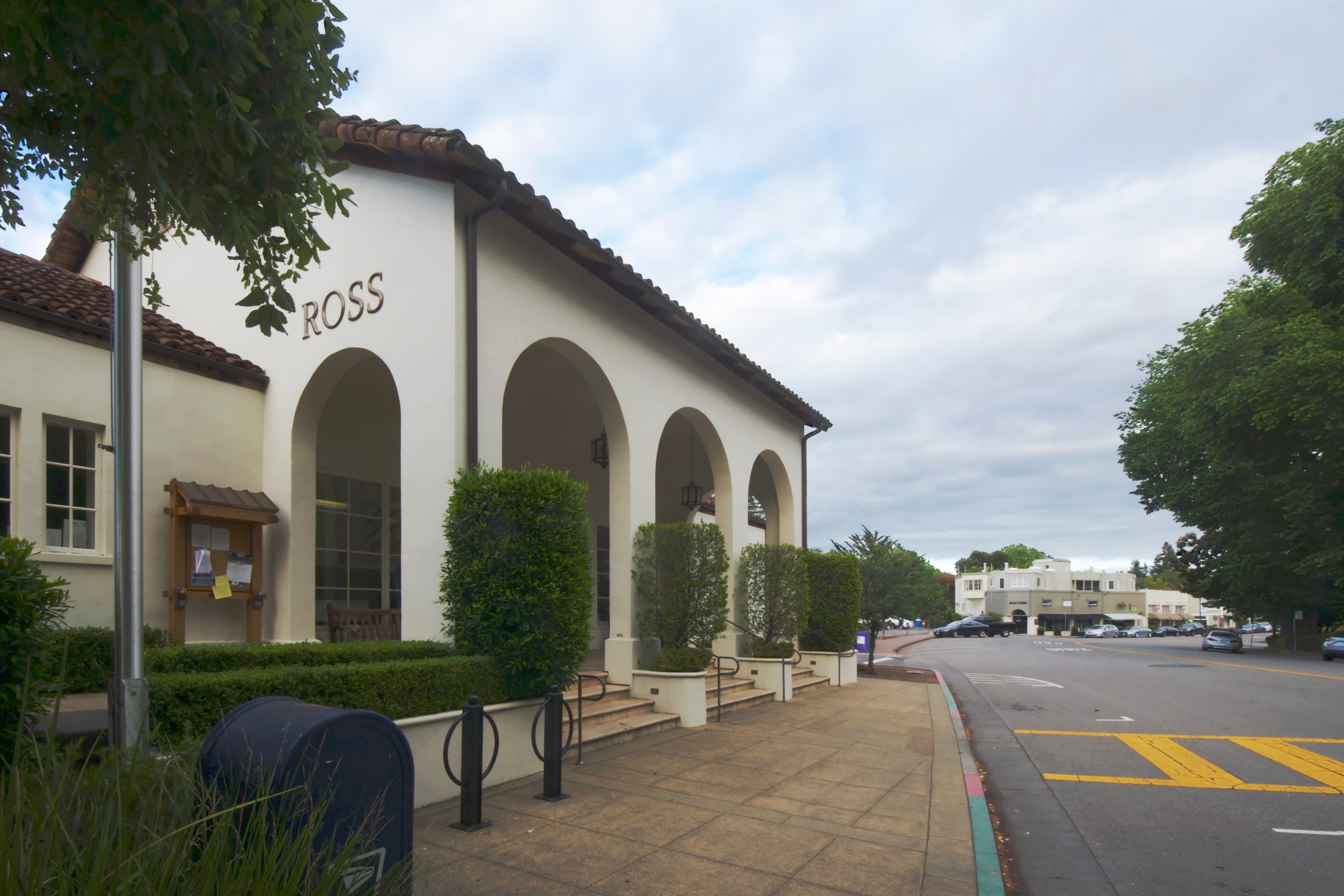
Ross is the 4th most expensive zip code in the United States.

The median income for a household in the county was $71,306 and the median income for a family was $88,934. As of 2007, these figures had risen to $83,732 and $104,750.

In May 2010, the county had the lowest unemployment rate in California. However, according to the U.S. Bureau of Labor Statistics, Marin's unemployment rate rose to 8.3% in July 2010.

== Government and infrastructure ==
=== Government ===
Marin County is a General Law County Governed by a five-member Board of Supervisors who are elected by district to serve alternating four year terms, The County government provides countywide services and voter registration, law enforcement, jails, vital records, property records, tax collection, public health, and social services, In addition the county serves as the local government for all unincorporated areas.

=== Law enforcement ===
San Quentin State Prison of the California Department of Corrections and Rehabilitation is in the county. San Quentin houses the male death row and the execution chamber of California.

The Marin County Sheriff's Office serves as the county's main law enforcement agency.

The Central Marin Police Authority is responsible for law enforcement in Larkspur, Corte Madera, and San Anselmo.

=== Fire protection ===
Marin County Fire Department

Agency overview
- Established: July 1, 1941
- Employees: 145
- Fire chief: Jason Weber
- IAFF: 1775

Facilities and equipment
- Stations: 6
- Engines: 5 - Type 1; 10 - Type 3
- Rescues: 1
- Tenders: 3
- Bulldozers: 1

Website
- Official website
- IAFF website

A fire department for the county was discussed as early as 1881 by the California State Legislature; the Tamalpais Forestry Association formed c. 1900. The Marin County Fire Department came into existence in its current incarnation on July 1, 1941, with passage of an ordinance and two resolutions by the Board of Supervisors.

=== Population Numeric Change ===
Marin County population increased 9,912 residents 3.93% from 252,409 residents in 2010 to 262,321 residents in 2020

== Politics ==
In the United States House of Representatives, Marin County is in California's 2nd congressional district, represented by Democrat Jared Huffman. From 2008 to 2012, Huffman represented Marin County in the California State Assembly.

In the California State Legislature, Marin County is in:

- the 12th Assembly District, represented by Democrat Damon Connolly
- the 2nd senatorial district, represented by Democrat Mike McGuire.

=== Voter registration statistics ===
Population and registered voters
Total population	250,666	
Registered voters (Note: Percentage of registered voters with respect to total population. Percentages of party members with respect to registered voters follow.)	154,250	61.5%
Democratic	83,853	54.4%
Republican	28,116	18.2%
Democratic–Republican spread	+55,737	+36.2%
American Independent	3,303	2.1%
Green	2,206	1.4%
Libertarian	837	0.5%
Peace and Freedom	254	0.2%
Americans Elect	4	0.0%
Other	426	0.3%
No party preference	35,251	12.9%

==== Cities by population and voter registration ====
Cities by population and voter registration
City	Population	Registered voters	Democratic	Republican	D–R spread	Other	No party preference
Belvedere	2,118	72.0%	38.2%	34.1%	+4.1%	6.6%	23.9%
Corte Madera	9,191	65.6%	55.7%	16.9%	+38.8%	6.3%	23.3%
Fairfax	7,410	73.2%	64.4%	7.1%	+57.3%	9.1%	21.1%
Larkspur	11,870	69.8%	54.7%	18.4%	+36.3%	5.6%	23.2%
Mill Valley	13,810	71.1%	61.5%	12.3%	+49.2%	5.3%	22.6%
Novato	51,206	57.9%	49.6%	23.3%	+26.3%	7.7%	22.3%
Ross	2,079	80.3%	42.9%	30.1%	+12.8%	5.8%	23.5%
San Anselmo	12,273	69.8%	62.0%	11.6%	+50.4%	7.4%	21.0%
San Rafael	57,374	51.5%	55.1%	17.9%	+37.2%	6.3%	22.7%
Sausalito	7,047	75.3%	52.1%	15.8%	+36.3%	6.7%	27.6%
Tiburon	8,895	67.8%	46.0%	25.0%	+21.0%	5.4%	25.7%

=== Overview ===
For most of the 20th century, Marin County was a Republican stronghold in presidential elections. From 1880 until 1984, the only Democrats to win there were Woodrow Wilson, Franklin Roosevelt and Lyndon Johnson. However, the brand of Republicanism prevailing in Marin County was historically a moderate one. Like most of the historically Republican suburbs of the Bay Area, it became friendlier to Democrats as the demographics of the area changed and the national party embraced social and religious conservatism. In 1984, it very narrowly voted for Walter Mondale and has supported the Democratic candidate in every presidential election since then. In the 2024 presidential election, Kamala Harris received 80.59% of the vote in Marin County, which was her highest vote share in any California county, and the only one higher than notably liberal San Francisco County.

United States presidential election results for Marin County, California (Note: This total comprised 2,750 votes for Progressive Theodore Roosevelt (who was official Republican nominee in California), 733 votes for Socialist Eugene V. Debs and 68 votes for Prohibition Party nominee Eugene W. Chafin.)
Year	Republican		Democratic		Third party(ies)	
Year	No.	%	No.	%	No.	%
1880	761	56.58%	561	41.71%	23	1.71%
1884	851	53.62%	727	45.81%	9	0.57%
1888	936	52.76%	802	45.21%	36	2.03%
1892	1,186	53.59%	949	42.88%	78	3.52%
1896	1,448	61.41%	874	37.07%	36	1.53%
1900	1,681	63.58%	904	34.19%	59	2.23%
1904	2,199	70.71%	772	24.82%	139	4.47%
1908	2,732	68.25%	983	24.56%	288	7.19%
1912	0	0.00%	2,849	44.52%	3,551	55.48%
1916	4,328	50.05%	3,789	43.82%	530	6.13%
1920	5,375	68.80%	1,688	21.61%	750	9.60%
1924	5,780	53.52%	656	6.07%	4,364	40.41%
1928	7,862	57.44%	5,686	41.54%	140	1.02%
1932	6,480	38.13%	9,764	57.45%	752	4.42%
1936	6,211	33.44%	12,152	65.43%	209	1.13%
1940	10,974	48.47%	11,365	50.20%	301	1.33%
1944	13,304	47.69%	14,516	52.04%	76	0.27%
1948	18,747	57.06%	12,540	38.17%	1,568	4.77%
1952	31,178	67.08%	14,824	31.90%	475	1.02%
1956	33,792	65.94%	17,301	33.76%	151	0.29%
1960	37,620	57.29%	27,888	42.47%	157	0.24%
1964	28,682	38.06%	46,462	61.65%	220	0.29%
1968	41,422	50.05%	36,278	43.84%	5,055	6.11%
1972	54,123	52.10%	47,414	45.64%	2,346	2.26%
1976	53,425	52.52%	43,590	42.86%	4,700	4.62%
1980	49,678	45.78%	39,231	36.16%	19,598	18.06%
1984	56,887	49.02%	57,533	49.58%	1,630	1.40%
1988	46,855	39.73%	69,394	58.85%	1,671	1.42%
1992	30,479	23.32%	76,158	58.27%	24,070	18.42%
1996	32,714	28.17%	67,406	58.04%	16,020	13.79%
2000	34,872	28.32%	79,135	64.26%	9,148	7.43%
2004	34,378	25.40%	99,070	73.21%	1,877	1.39%
2008	28,384	20.25%	109,320	77.98%	2,493	1.78%
2012	30,880	22.96%	99,896	74.26%	3,740	2.78%
2016	21,771	15.63%	108,707	78.05%	8,795	6.31%
2020	24,612	15.79%	128,288	82.33%	2,930	1.88%
2024	24,054	16.69%	116,152	80.59%	3,923	2.72%

Marin has voted for many gubernatorial candidates who went on to become high-profile national figures, including Richard Nixon, Ronald Reagan, Jerry Brown, and Dianne Feinstein.

On November 4, 2008, the citizens of Marin County voted strongly against Proposition 8, a constitutional amendment which eliminated the right of same-sex couples to marry, by a 75.1 percent to 24.9 percent margin. The official tally was 103,341 against and 34,324 in favor. Only San Francisco County voted against the measure by a wider margin (75.2% against).

According to the California Secretary of State, as of February 10, 2019, Marin County has 161,870 registered voters. Of those, 89,526 (55.31%) are registered Democrats, 23,380 (14.44%) are registered Republicans, 7,020 (4.35%) are registered with other political parties, and 41,908 (25.89%) have declined to state a political party. Democrats hold wide voter-registration majorities in all political subdivisions in Marin County. Democrats' largest registration advantage in Marin is in the town of Fairfax, wherein there are only 344 Republicans (6.1%) out of 5,678 total voters compared to 3,758 Democrats (66.2%) and 1,276 voters who have declined to state a political party (22.5%).

The last time Marin elected a Republican to represent them in the United States House of Representatives was William S. Mailliard in 1972. The last competitive race for the U.S. House of Representatives in Marin was in 1982 when Barbara Boxer was first elected. The longest serving representative of Marin in congress was Clarence F. Lea who served in the House from 1917 to 1949.

Due to the dynamic nature of California's population, Marin's congressional district has changed numerous times over the decades. The county has been part of the 2nd congressional district of California since 2012; the only other time it was part of the 2nd district was 1902–12. It has also been part of the 1st (1894–1902 and 1912–66), 3rd (1864–94), 5th (1974–82), and the 6th (1972–74 and 1982–2012). The only time the county has not been in a single congressional district was between 1966 and 1972, when it was divided between the northern half in the 1st district and the southern half in the 6th district.

=== "Marin County hot-tubber" ===
In 2002, former U.S. President George H. W. Bush denounced convicted American Taliban associate John Walker Lindh as "some misguided Marin County hot-tubber," as a reference to the county's liberal, "hippie" political culture, mispronouncing "Marin" as he did so. Outraged by the label, some local residents wrote scathing letters to the Marin Independent Journal, complaining of Bush's remarks. In response, Bush wrote a letter to readers in the same newspaper, admitting regret and promising to not use the phrases Marin County and hot tub "in the same sentence again."

== Transportation ==
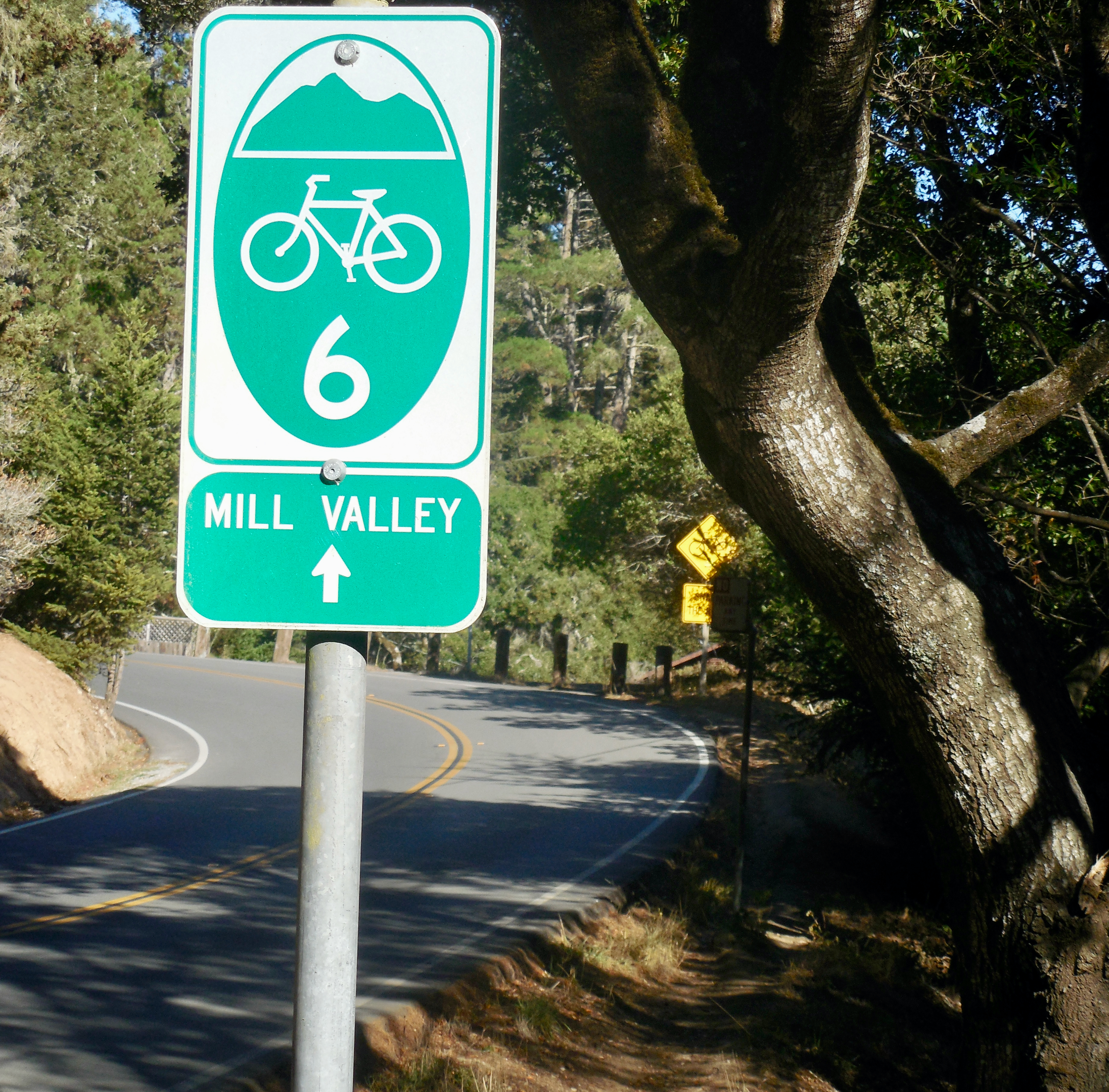
CA Bicycle Network Route 6 along Muir Woods Road near Mill Valley

=== Major highways ===
- I-580
- US 101
- SR 1
- SR 37
- SR 131

=== Public transportation ===
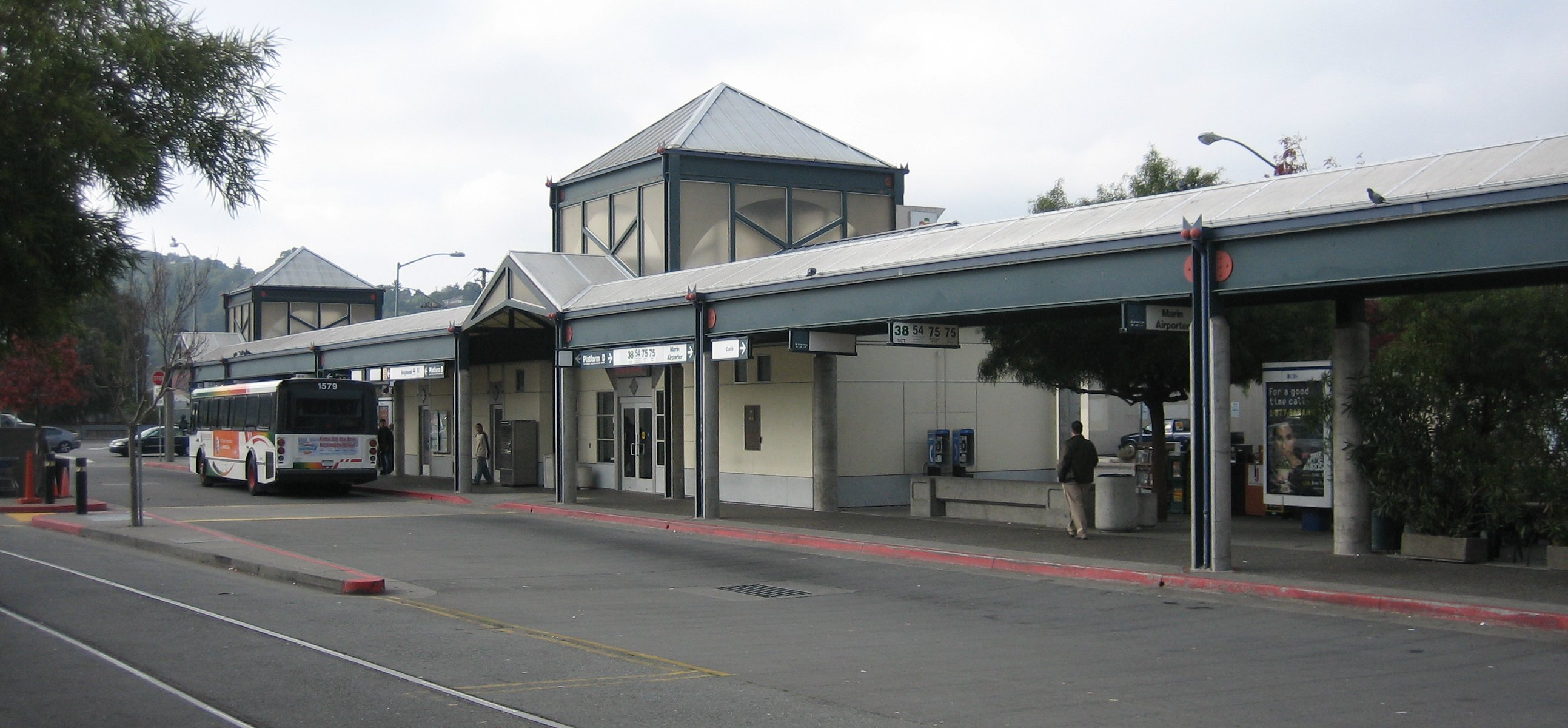
San Rafael Transit Center, a hub for Marin Transit and Golden Gate Transit buses and station for SMART

Golden Gate Transit provides service primarily along the U.S. 101 corridor, serving cities in Marin County, as well as San Francisco and Sonoma County. Service is also provided to Contra Costa County via the Richmond-San Rafael Bridge. Ferries to San Francisco operate from Larkspur, Sausalito and Tiburon. Ferry service from Tiburon is provided by Golden Gate Ferry, Blue and Gold Fleet and by the Angel Island Ferry.

Local bus routes within Marin County are operated by Golden Gate Transit under contract with Marin Transit. Marin Transit also operates the West Marin Stage, serving communities in the western, rural areas of Marin County, the Muir Woods Shuttle, and 6 community shuttle routes.

The Sonoma–Marin Area Rail Transit system, which began service in August 2017, is a commuter rail service and bicycle-pedestrian pathway serving Sonoma and Marin counties. As of 2019 service operates from Sonoma County Airport to six stations in Marin ending near Larkspur Landing. Later phases of construction will extend service further north to Cloverdale in Sonoma County.

The Marin Airporter offers scheduled bus service to and from Marin County and the San Francisco Airport.

Greyhound Lines buses service San Rafael.

=== Airports ===
Marin County Airport or Gnoss Field (ICAO: KDVO) is a general aviation airport operated by the County Department of Public Works. The nearest airports with commercial flights are San Francisco International Airport and Oakland International Airport, as well as Charles M. Schulz–Sonoma County Airport, which is located north of Marin County.

== Education ==
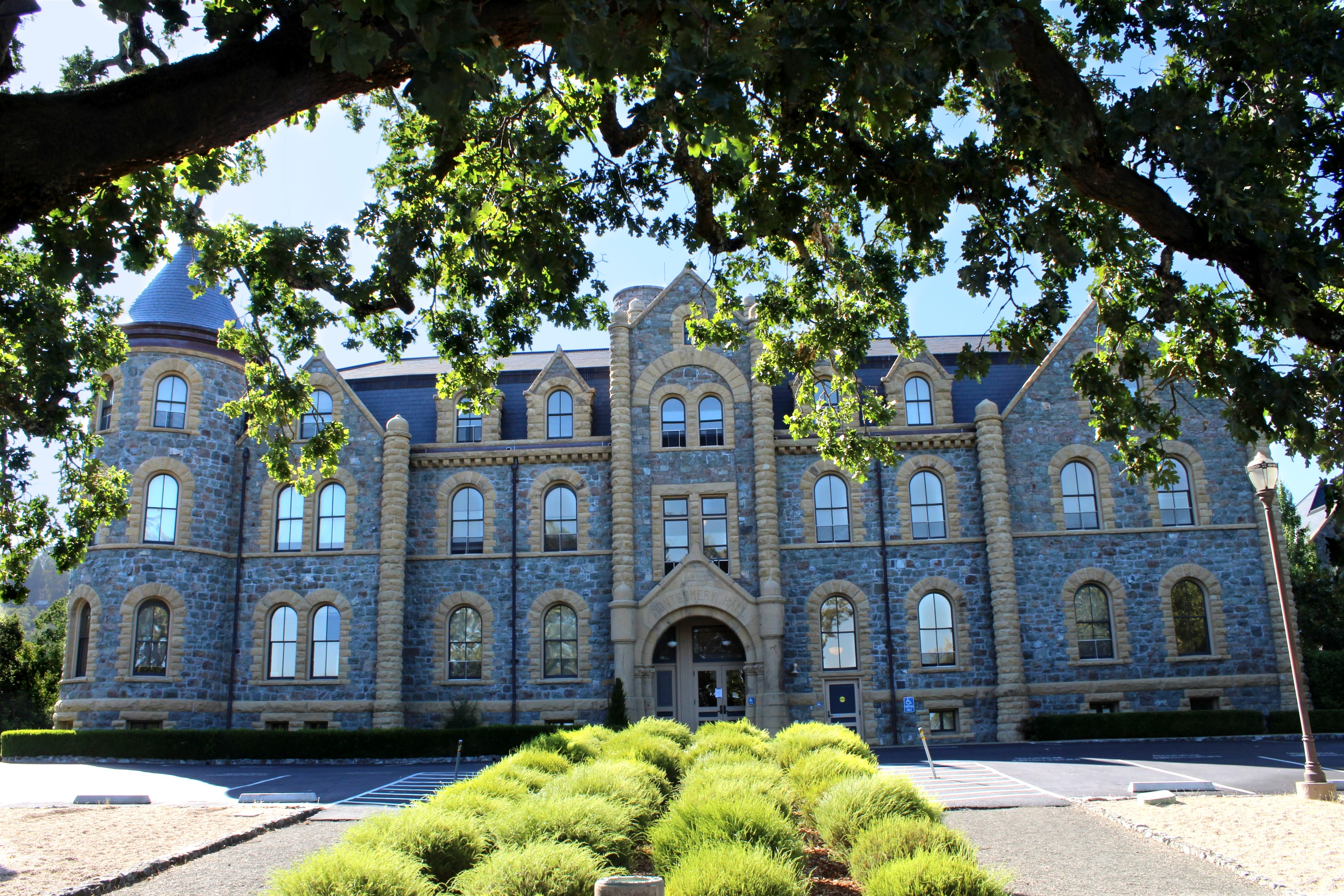
San Francisco Theological Seminary in San Anselmo.

Marin County Free Library is the county library system. It is headquartered in San Rafael. In addition, the Belvedere-Tiburon Library is in Tiburon.

College of Marin, established in 1926, includes two campuses. The Kentfield Campus is in Kentfield; the Indian Valley Campus is in Novato. The college offers more than 40 degree programs leading to an Associate of Arts or Associate of Science degree and over 20 Certificates of Achievement with various specialties. The college serves approximately 9,000 students each term. Approximately 5,700 students enroll in COM's credit program. About 1,300 students enroll in English as a Second Language classes. Approximately 1,900 enroll in community education classes. The college employs about 300 permanent staff and faculty and many part-time employees.

Marin is also home to Dominican University of California, in San Rafael. Founded as a women's college in 1890 by the Dominican Sisters of San Rafael, it became the first Catholic institution in California to offer bachelor's degrees to women. The college became fully coeducational in 1971, and in 2000 became an independent liberal-arts university, changing from its original name of Dominican College of San Rafael. There are about 1,400 undergraduate and 500 graduate students.

== Culture ==
- Marin Museum of the American Indian
- Marin Museum of Contemporary Art
- Marin Museum of Bicycling
- Museum of International Propaganda
- The Space Station Museum

== Economy ==
As of 2011, the largest private-sector employers in Marin County were:

1. Kaiser Permanente (1,803 full-time employees in Marin County)
2. MarinHealth (1,100)
3. Fireman's Fund Insurance Company (950)
4. Autodesk (878)
5. BioMarin Pharmaceutical (871)
6. Safeway Inc. (841)
7. Comcast (620)
8. Macy's (380)
9. Bradley Real Estate (376)
10. MHN (350)
11. Dominican University of California (346)
12. Wells Fargo (332)
13. Kentfield Rehabilitation and Specialty Hospital (315)
14. Community Action Marin (268)
15. Costco (260)
16. Brayton Purcell (256)
17. CVS/pharmacy (232)
18. Novato Community Hospital (227)
19. Lucasfilm (220)
20. FICO (200+)
21. Mollie Stone's Markets (190)
22. Guide Dogs for the Blind (189)
23. W. Bradley Electric (185)
24. Bank of Marin (178)
25. Cagwin & Dorward (175)
26. Ghilotti Bros. (145)
27. West Bay Builders (133)
28. Villa Marin (130)

The 2013 gross value of all agricultural production in Marin County was about $84 million; of this, more than $63 million was from the sale of livestock and their products (milk, eggs, wool, etc.). Only 175 acres were planted to grapes.

As of the fourth quarter 2021, Marin County had a median home value of $1,090,583, an increase of 11% from the prior year.

== Media ==
Marin County receives media from the rest of the Bay Area.

The county also has several media outlets that serve the local community:

- Marin Magazine, a monthly lifestyle magazine with headquarters in Sausalito.
- Marin Independent Journal, a daily newspaper with headquarters in San Rafael.
- Pacific Sun, a free weekly distributed throughout the county.
- Novato Advance, a weekly newspaper that serves Marin's second-largest city.
- The Point Reyes Light, a weekly newspaper.
- KWMR radio, West Marin Radio, in Point Reyes.
- Channel 26, public-access television cable TV in Marin.
- Marin Local Music, Music listings for Marin's Restaurants & Venues who host live music.
- San Francisco Examiner, Rick Marianetti, Marin County Culture & Events.

== Communities ==
=== Cities and towns ===
- Belvedere
- Corte Madera
- Fairfax
- Larkspur
- Mill Valley
- Novato
- Ross
- San Anselmo
- San Rafael
- Sausalito
- Tiburon

=== Census-designated places ===
- Alto
- Black Point-Green Point
- Bolinas
- Dillon Beach
- Inverness
- Kentfield
- Lagunitas-Forest Knolls
- Lucas Valley-Marinwood
- Marin City
- Muir Beach
- Nicasio
- Point Reyes Station
- San Geronimo
- Santa Venetia
- Sleepy Hollow
- Stinson Beach
- Strawberry
- Tamalpais-Homestead Valley
- Tomales
- Woodacre

=== Unincorporated communities ===
- Bel Marin Keys
- Burdell
- California Park
- Dogtown
- Fallon
- Greenbrae
- Hamlet
- Ignacio
- Inverness Park
- Las Gallinas
- Los Ranchitos
- Marconi
- Marshall
- Olema
- Paradise Cay
- San Quentin
- Shafter
- Tocaloma

=== Population ranking ===
The population ranking of the following table is based on the 2020 census of Marin County.

† county seat

Rank	City/Town/etc.	Municipal type	Population (2020 Census)
1	† San Rafael	City	61,271
2	Novato	City	53,225
3	Mill Valley	City	14,231
4	Larkspur	City	13,064
5	San Anselmo	Town	12,830
6	Tamalpais-Homestead Valley	CDP	11,492
7	Corte Madera	Town	10,222
8	Tiburon	Town	9,146
9	Fairfax	Town	7,605
10	Sausalito	City	7,269
11	Kentfield	CDP	6,808
12	Lucas Valley-Marinwood	CDP	6,259
13	Strawberry	CDP	5,447
14	Santa Venetia	CDP	4,292
15	Marin City	CDP	2,993
16	Sleepy Hollow	CDP	2,401
17	Ross	Town	2,338
18	Belvedere	City	2,126
19	Lagunitas-Forest Knolls	CDP	1,924
20	Bolinas	CDP	1,483
21	Black Point-Green Point	CDP	1,431
22	Woodacre	CDP	1,410
23	Inverness	CDP	1,379
24	Point Reyes Station	CDP	895
25	Alto	CDP	732
26	Stinson Beach	CDP	541
27	San Geronimo	CDP	510
28	Muir Beach	CDP	304
29	Dillon Beach	CDP	246
30	Tomales	CDP	187
31	Nicasio	CDP	81

== In popular culture ==
- The 1954 science fiction novel The Body Snatchers was set in Mill Valley.
- The 1965 film Dear Brigitte features characters living in the Sausalito houseboat community.
- The 1978 novel The Serial satirized Marin County lifestyles of that era and drew national attention to the area. The novel was adapted into a 1980 film titled Serial, which was also filmed in Marin County.
- Several Philip K. Dick novels, including the 1984 novel The Man Whose Teeth Were All Exactly Alike were set in Marin County.
- The 1986 film On the Edge was filmed and set in Marin County and features a fictionalized version of the Dipsea Race.
- Other films and programs set and filmed in Marin include Mother (1996), Wildflowers (1999), and Edge of Everything (2023).

== See also ==
- Gnoss Field
- Harkleroad wind turbine
- List of California counties
- List of people from Marin County, California
- List of school districts in Marin County, California
- National Register of Historic Places listings in Marin County, California
- Skywalker Sound, a division of Lucasfilm in Marin County
- I Want It All Now!
