= Marin Museum of the American Indian =

Museum in California, U.S.

Museum of the American Indian
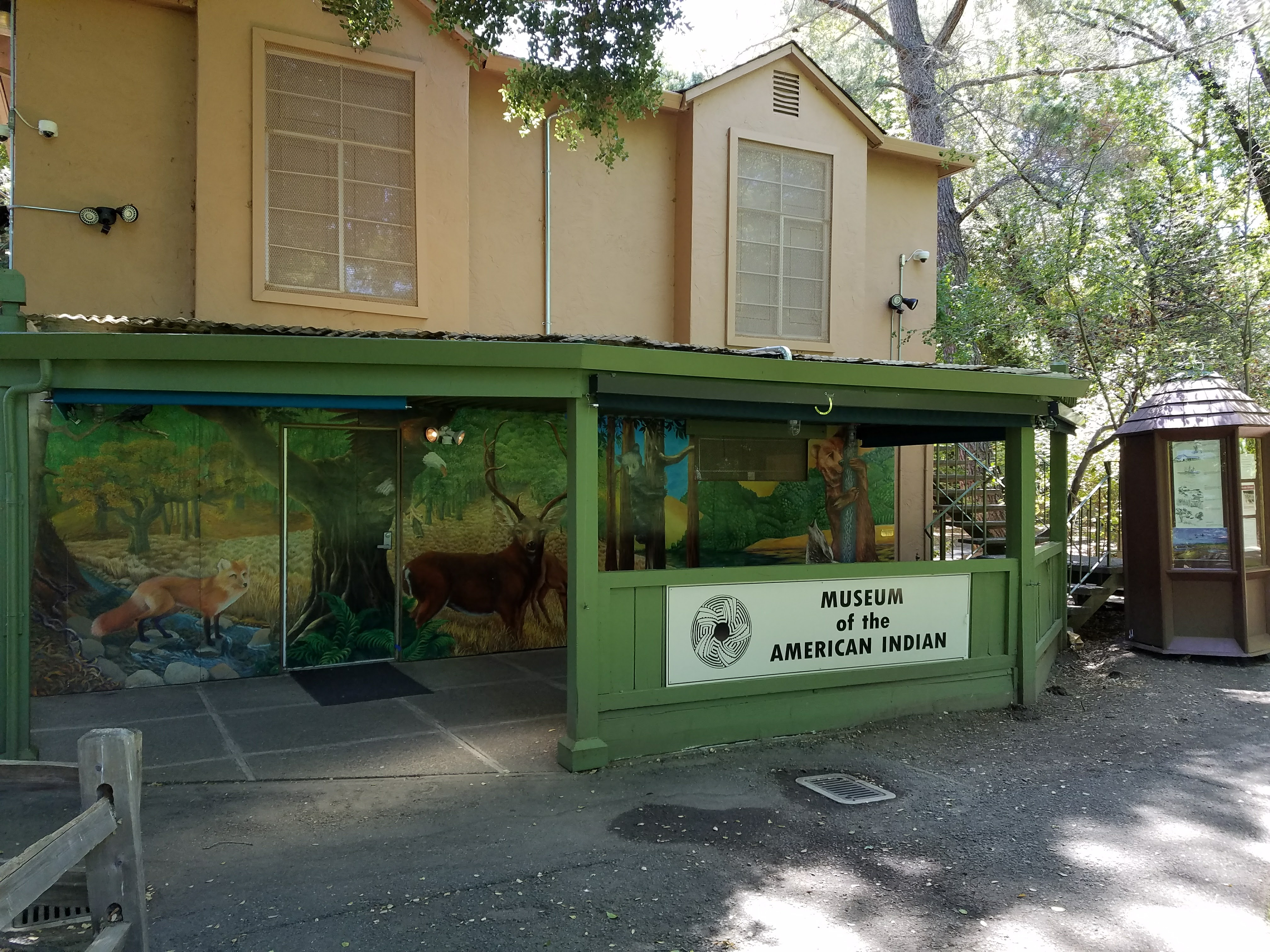
- Museum of the American Indian in Miwok Park, Novato, California
- Former name: Marin Museum of the American Indian
- Established: 1967
- Location: Novato, California, US
- Website: www.marinindian.com

The Museum of the American Indian (formerly the Marin Museum of the American Indian) was founded in 1967 and is located in Novato, California, U.S. on the site of a former Coast Miwok settlement. The museum is within the 35 acres (14 ha) of Miwok Park in northern Marin County.

== History ==
Founded in 1967, after the Novato High School Archaeology Club petitioned the Novato board of supervisors to lobby for an antiquities ordinance to ensure the preservation of the local artifacts and remains. The ordinance was approved. In May 1967, the Novato High School Archaeology Club published their official “Report on the Excavation of Marin – 374." This led to a write-up in the December 1967 issue of the magazine “Scientific American.” Club member, Pete Moore advocated for a location to house the artifacts unearthed during the club's digs. In 1967, the Museum of the American Indian opened its doors.

== About ==
Today, over 7,000 people visit the museum annually, including 4,000 school children from around the Bay Area. The museum collection includes Native American artifacts, paintings, photography, and more.

The museum also hosts an annual Trade Feast in Miwok Park which features indigenous dancers, basket weaving and arrow head napping demonstrations, children's activities, native foods, and more. The Museum is open from 12:30 p to 4:30 p Friday through Sunday and hosts free activities throughout year.
