= Marin County Free Library =

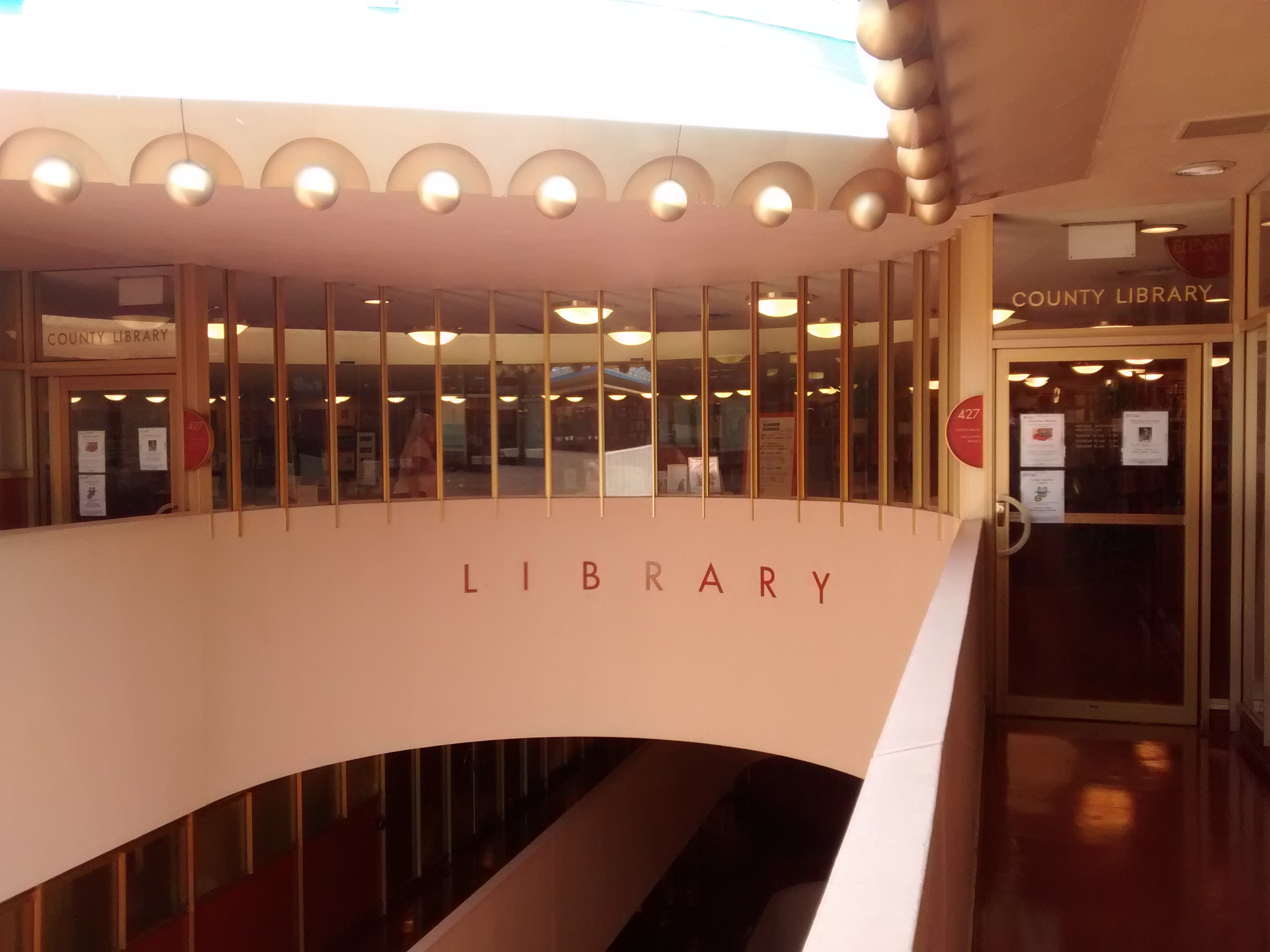
Civic Center Branch of the Marin County Free Library

Marin County Free Library is a medium-sized public library system that serves the unincorporated areas of Marin County, as well as municipalities in the County that are not served by a city-run public library.

== History ==
The Marin County Free Library was established in 1926 by the county's Board of Supervisors. In 1927, Muriel Wright opened its first branch in the basement of what was at the time the County Courthouse in San Rafael.

The library has a digital collection related to the California Motion Picture Corporation's film productions.

== Funding ==
The library is funded predominantly by a parcel tax levied on properties within its jurisdiction.

== Branches ==
The Marin County Free Library serves two core communities in Marin County. The eastern half of the county is heavily developed and branches in the area are typically larger and serve incorporated communities. The western half of the county, West Marin, is largely rural, and the branches in the region are smaller and serve predominantly unincorporated communities. The West Marin branches are administered jointly by a single manager.

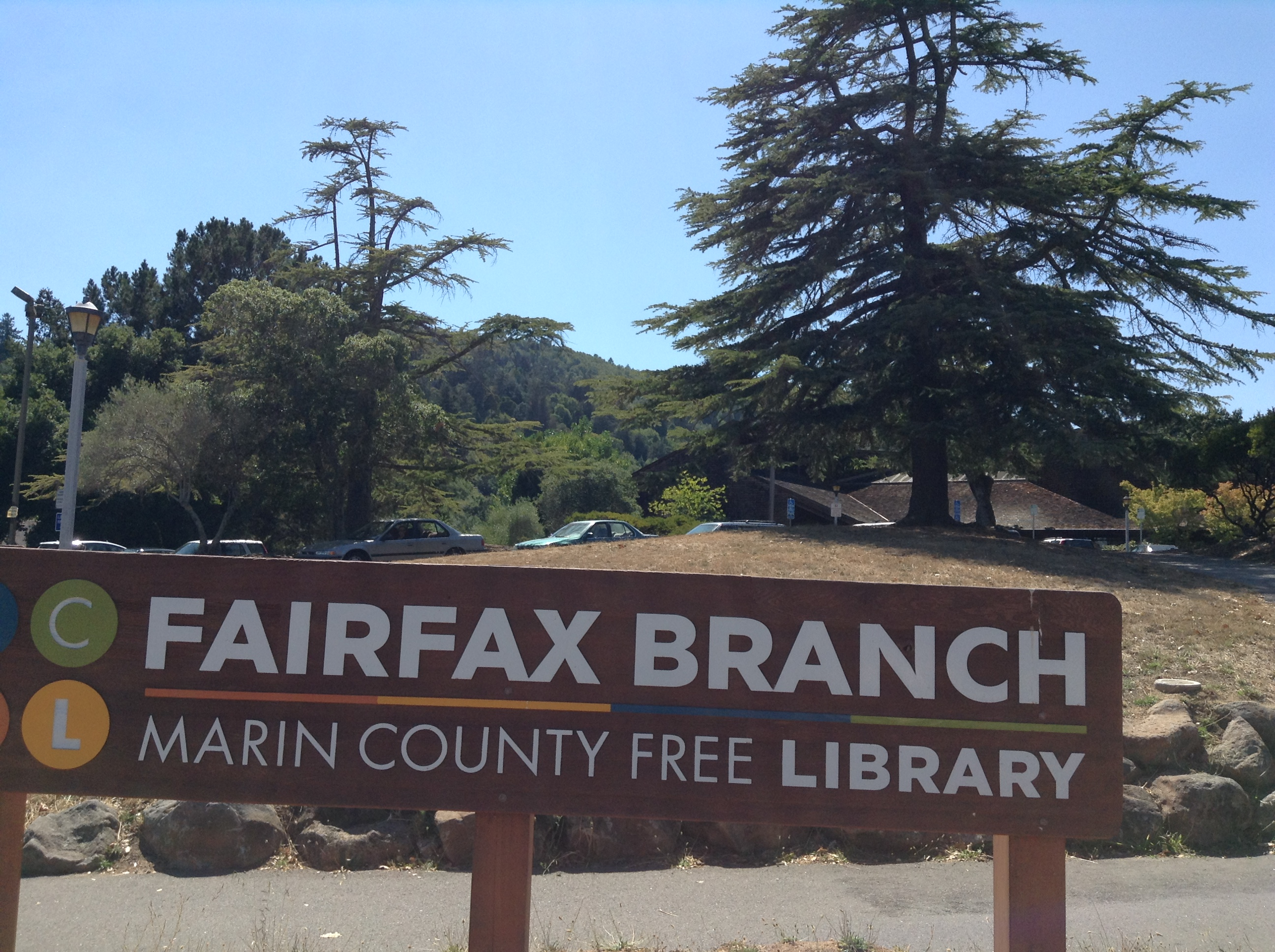
A sign for the Fairfax branch of the Marin County Library system

== See also ==
- Belvedere Tiburon Library
- Sausalito Library
