= Novato rotating house and wind turbine =

Wind turbine in Novato, California

Harkleroad wind turbine
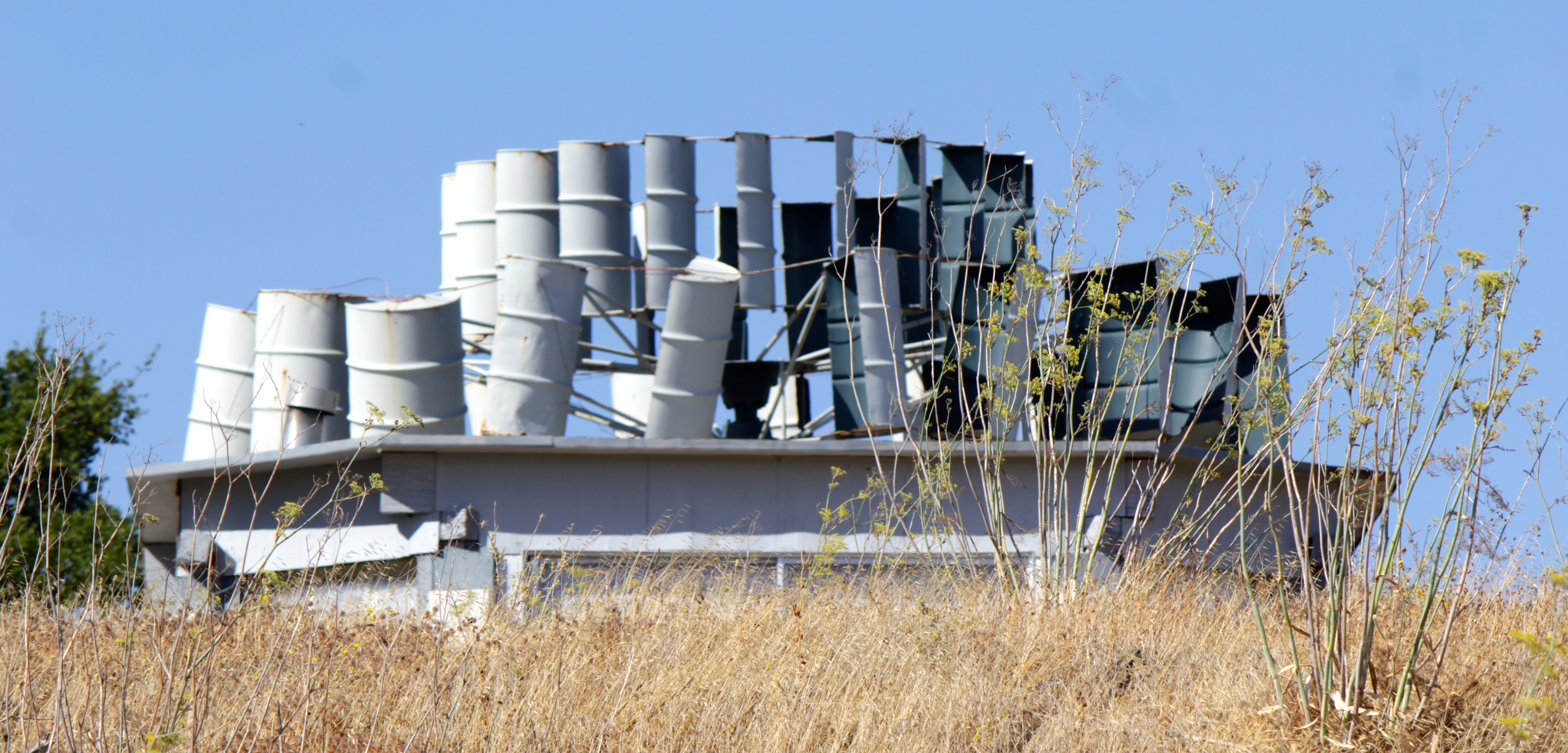
- Interactive map of the Harkleroad wind turbine area

General information
- Location: 19 Harkle Road, Novato, California 94945-4109, United States
- Coordinates: 38.10086°N 122.56246°W

Technical details
- Floor area: 1562 sq/ft

Design and construction
- Architect: Samuel A. Harkleroad

Other information
- Number of rooms: 3 br

The Harkleroad rotating house, the Harkleroad taco House, and a workshop with a distinctive Harkleroad wind turbine on its roof are 3 unusual structures built by Sam Harkleroad in Novato, California, in the late 1950s and early 1960s. The Rotating House is built on a platform and is able to rotate 320 degrees, while the Taco House has a parabolic saddle roof. Both residences still stand and are in use today. However, the wind turbine was removed from the roof of the workshop structure in 2021 and is no longer visible.

== Sam Harkleroad ==
Sam Harkleroad was born on October 20, 1909, and grew up on a farm in Fresno. His education ended with high school. He lived much of his life in Marin County. Harkleroad died on June 12, 1993, at the age of 83. Harkleroad had a wife, Fern, and a daughter, Renee Israel.

Harkleroad was a contractor who liked to take on unusual architectural projects and use recycled materials.

Around 1960, Harkleroad designed and constructed three unusual structures on a low hill on Harkle Road in Novato:

- A round home that rotates.
- A home built with a roof shaped as a hyperbolic paraboloid, known as the "Taco House" or the "Potato Chip House" or the "Parabola House".
- A workshop building, with the Harkleroad wind turbine mounted on the roof.

Harkleroad built various other unusual dwellings in the area. Most were destroyed when the U.S. Route 101 was built across his land. Sam Harkleroad was known as "The Frank Lloyd Wright of Marin County."

== Round house ==
The round house is able to rotate 320 degrees, while the plumbing and electrical systems continue to function.

Harkleroad round hou

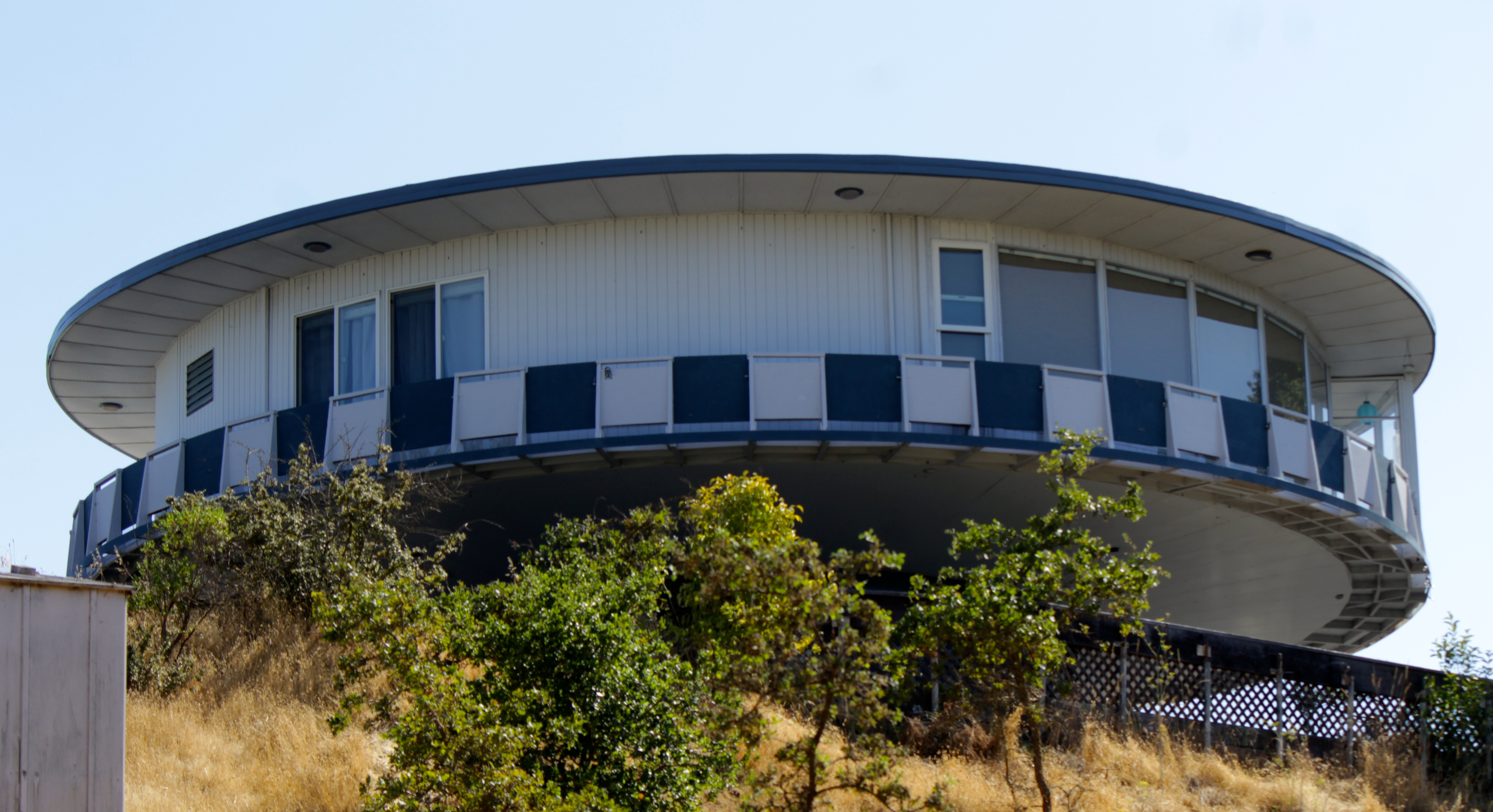
Round house

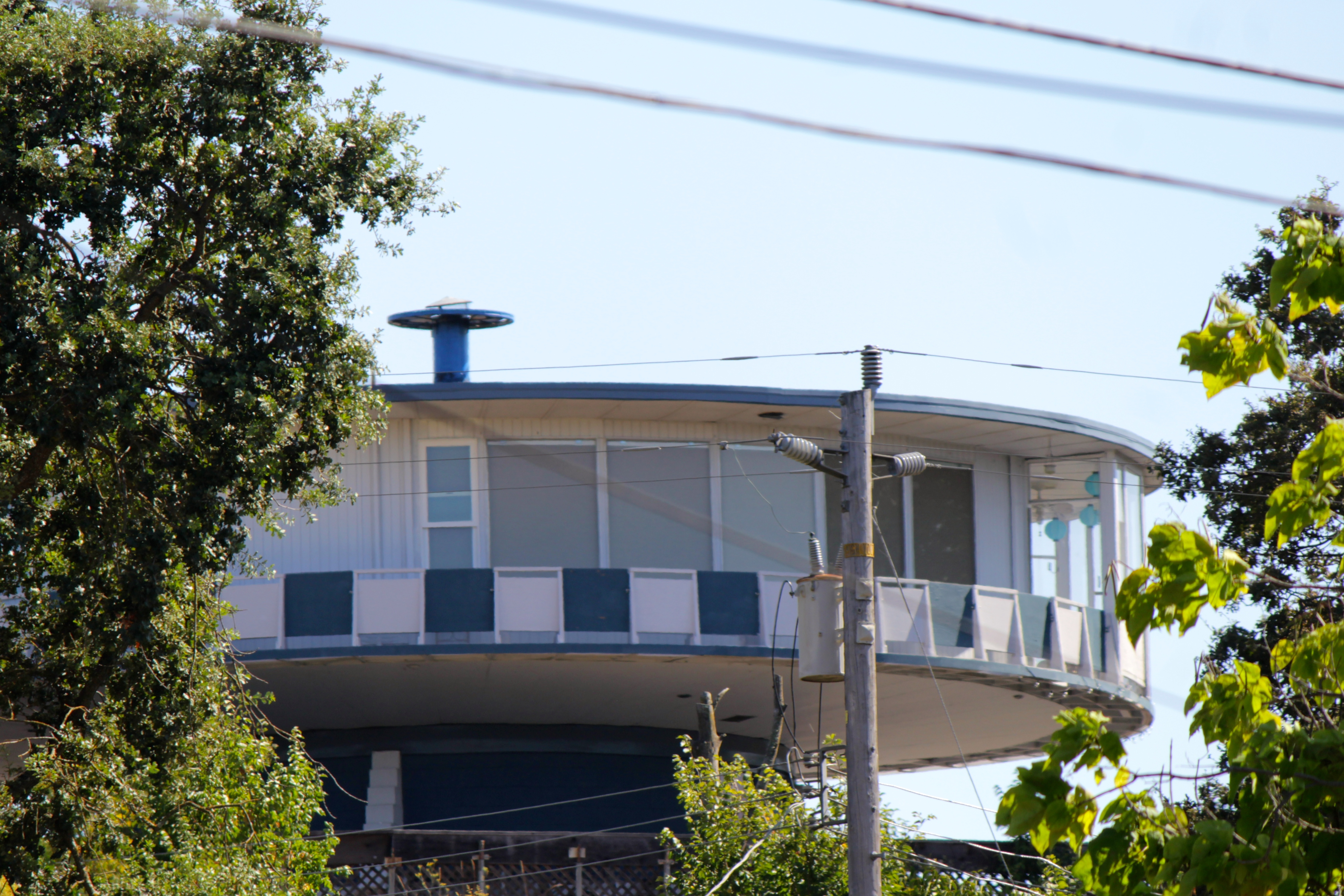
Round house with part of support base showingse

The house rides on "inverted" railroad track and is powered by a used washing machine motor. The rooms are wedge-shaped. There is a spiral staircase in the middle leading to the basement and motor room. The dark squares around the outside of the house are gates. There is one stationary stairway leading up to the deck, so regardless of how the house is rotated, a gate is available to allow access to the deck from the stairway.

The house had been rented for a number of years. It went on sale as part of a 7-home property in August 2026, with an asking price of $3,300,000. Harold Pozzi, Sam Harkleroad's grandson, cited the difficulty maintaining the property at his advancing age as the reason for the sale.

== Taco house ==
This residence has a parabolic saddle roof made of 2-by-4 lumber.

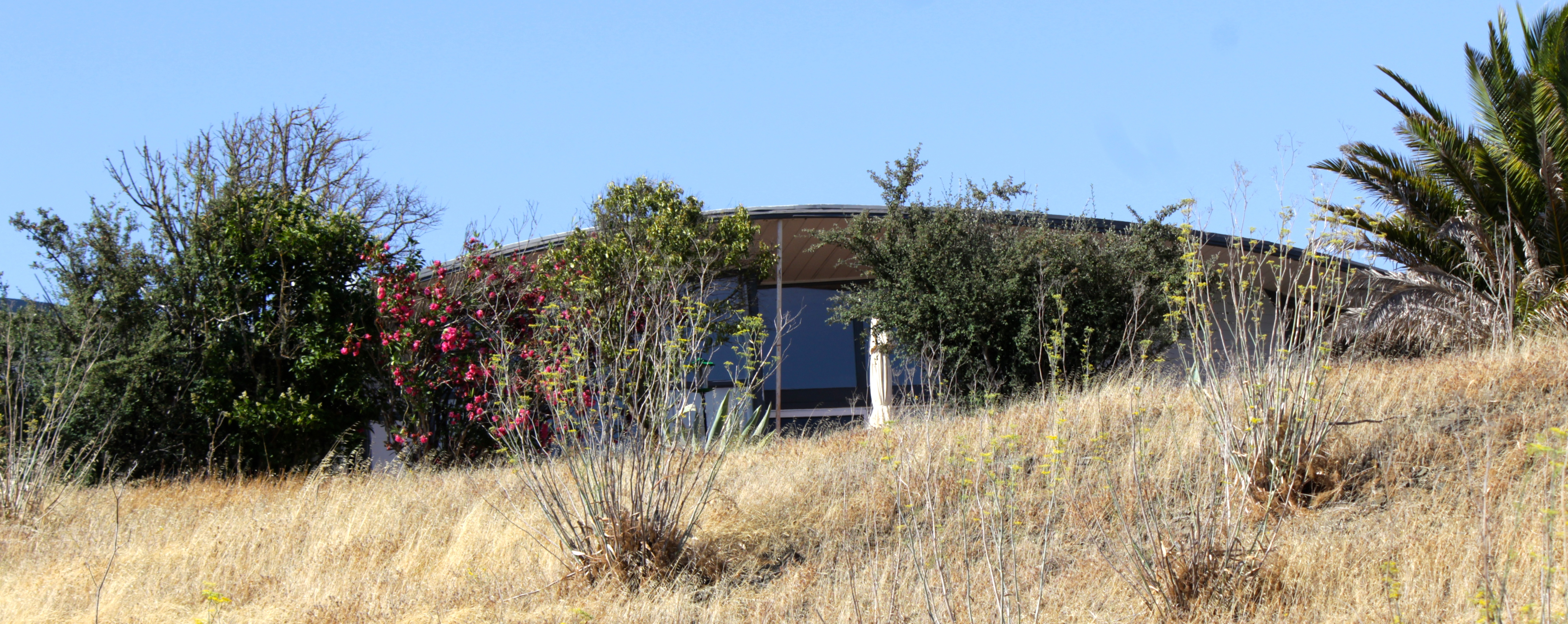
Harkleroad Taco house

This house was for sale in 1959, with a minimum bid of $32,000. It has movable interior walls so the occupant can change the shape and size of rooms.

== Workshop with wind turbine ==
The workshop had a distinctive Savonius wind turbine mounted on its roof to generate electricity. It was visible from U.S. Route 101, a heavily traveled freeway. In 2021, the turbine was removed from the roof of the workshop, and it is no longer visible from the freeway.
