= Belvedere Tiburon Library =

Public library in Tiburon, California, US

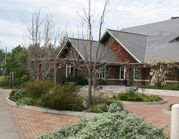
- The Belvedere Tiburon Library entryway
- 37.8771°N 122.4615°W
- Location: Tiburon
- Established: 1929

Collection
- Size: 206,829 books and other items

Access and use
- Population served: 11,665 (Tiburon and Belvedere)

Other information
- Director: Crystal Duran
- Employees: 14
- Website: www.beltiblibrary.org

The Belvedere Tiburon Library is an independent public library serving the communities of Belvedere, Tiburon, and Strawberry, in California and it is operated by The Belvedere Tiburon Library Agency. It has as its mission the provision of library services now and in the future that will encourage and support a literate, enlightened and cultured community.

The Tiburon Peninsula has had a library presence since 1895. Belvedere Tiburon joined as a branch of Marin County Free Libraries in 1929. The library ceased to be a branch in 1997, when it moved to its current location. The brand new 10,200 sq. ft. library building was built next to the new town hall to complete a civic center at the end of the peninsula.

The library is a member of the Marin Automated Resources and Information Network (MARINet), a consortium of publicly funded libraries in Marin County. Deborah Mazzolini was the director of the Belvedere Tiburon Library from 1997 to 2022. She is succeeded by Crystal Duran. The architectural style is that of the 19th-century railroad yard in Tiburon, a nod to local history.

== History ==
1895: The Flora Temple Steamer

The Temple Library Society of Tiburon established a free public library aboard an abandoned Sacramento River side-wheeler named the Flora Temple. The side-wheeler was tethered close to old Tiburon's less decorous Main Street at the site of today's Woodlands supermarket. At the turn of the century, the books from the Flora Temple Library may have been moved to a ferry carrying commuters between Tiburon and San Francisco, according to local historians.

1929: American Trust Building

A branch library serving Tiburon and Belvedere opened under county aegis upstairs in the American Trust Building on Tiburon's Main Street for $15 a month. Mrs. Ellen Weldin was the custodian of the library for thirteen years.

1931: Belvedere Land Company

Two years after the branch library was created on Main Street, Belvedere set up its own library in the back of the Belvedere Land Company offices on Beach Road. One of the several librarians who served in Belvedere was artist Selden Connor Gile. Nobody, least of all Mr. Gile, would have guessed that he was going to become one of the famous “Society of Six”, consisting of California's leading landscape painters. The mural that he created for the library was always admired. It was destroyed in the Oakland hills fire in 1991. Prints of the painting are available from the Landmarks Society. Following Mr. Gile, Belvedere's Artelle Farley ran the library.

1950: The Old Ark

In 1950, the owner of the American Trust Building decided to convert the old bank building to offices. The library needed to move and along to the rescue came Sam Vella, the civic-minded owner of Sam's Anchor Café. He offered to renovate an old ark that was grounded on the edge of the lagoon (long since filled) across the street from the bank building in what is now the entrance to the Main Street parking lot. The library served Tiburon readers in slightly soggy quarters for five years, under the management of Ellene Weldin and Nikki Lamott.

1953, 1955: Boardwalk Shopping Center

In 1953 the City of Belvedere and the Town of Tiburon again reunited to form a library. Artelle Farley came from Belvedere to join Nikki Lamott at the library on the converted ark in Tiburon. Facilities in the little ark were stretched to the limit and it took two years to find new quarters. In the meantime, Nikki Lamott was replaced by Librarian Betty McKegney and the remarriage of the Tiburon and Belvedere libraries would never again be put asunder. In 1955 the Belvedere Land Company offered space in its brand new Boardwalk Shopping Center. It became an active library, circulation grew, and the library stayed on the Boardwalk for ten years.

1966: Beach Road

The library in the Boardwalk Shopping Center was in a great location, but still relatively small and was housed on the second floor. In 1966 the generous Harry Allen family of the Belvedere Land Company offered larger ground floor space across the street from the end of the Boardwalk. Next door to the Tiburon-Belvedere Post Office, it was a vastly better place for a library. The library remained in this location for thirty-one years. The long narrow space was cluttered. Despite that, it was warm and cozy and welcoming and it was the place where the growing community of adults, teenagers and children fell in love with their library.

1997: 1501 Tiburon Blvd.

Over time the small, county branch library became inadequate for the community. In 1984, meetings began to raise specific issues about ways and means to improve the library and residents from both Belvedere and Tiburon joined forces to confront the situation. In 1987 a small group of people began meeting regularly for breakfast at the home of Rex and Rita Fink in Belvedere.

Following two county studies concluding that the Belvedere Tiburon branch was too small for the needs of the community, Marin County Supervisor Al Aramburu and Jim Levorsen joined the initial group and suggested putting together statistics and documenting what was needed. Levorsen went on to draft an outline for a library expansion program.

In March 1989 the Library Committee met and started a series of community meetings to solicit ideas. By August 1990, they began looking for a new location where a new library could be built and started meeting weekly and looking for a new home. A piece of land donated to the city of Tiburon by the Zelinsky family, Ed Zelinsky of Main Street Properties and his sister Barbara Abrams, became the frontrunner site.

In 1991 the committee decided to ask the Tiburon Town Council to dedicate the Mar West site for the new library. At first, the town expected payment for this property but in 1995, the council agreed to convey the property without payment in memory of Rex Fink. In 1992, library volunteers celebrated by erecting a sign at the site reading"Future Home of the New Belvedere Tiburon Library". An aggressive fundraising drive was launched and library plans were unveiled later on in 1992. The architectural contract was won by Bull, Stockwell, Allen of San Francisco, and they unveiled the sketches of a one-story 10,200 square foot building designed in the tradition of Belvedere brown shingle cottages and waterfront townhouses.

While other groups were negotiating for a bigger share of the tax revenue with the county system a secession proposal emerged. The foundation's steering committee came out and recommended that Belvedere Tiburon withdraw from the Marin County Free Library system and establish an independent library district for the Tiburon Peninsula. Fundraising began in earnest with groups such as the Bookmarks organizing a raft of benefits, luncheons, concerts, to support the new library building.

County officials agreed to turn over to the new library all general and special tax revenue generated by Tiburon and Belvedere property owners. The Belvedere and Tiburon city councils agreed to the withdrawal from the Marin County library system as well. A seven-member board was formed to lead the Belvedere Tiburon Library Agency with members appointed by the local city councils and the Reed Union School District.

Voters completed the financing for the new library when they approved a $1.6 million bond measure in November 1995. Construction began soon after and the new building opened its doors in April 1997.

== Governance ==
The Belvedere Tiburon Library Agency

The Joint Power Agreement created the Belvedere Tiburon Library Agency for the purpose of establishing a new entity to construct, own, and operate, and maintain a new public municipal library under the authority of Education CodeSection 18900 et seq. The all-volunteer Library Agency Board consists of three Trustees appointed by the elected Belvedere City Council, three Trustees appointed by the elected Tiburon Town Council, and one Trustee appointed by the elected Reed Union School District Board.

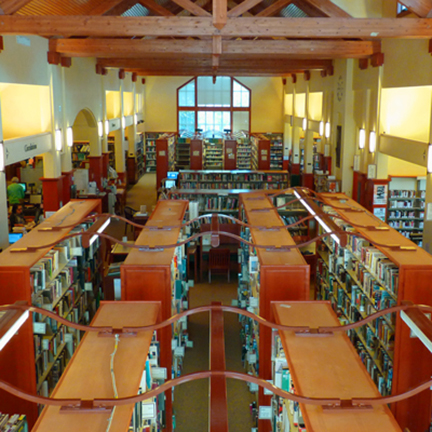
view of library book stacks

The Board is responsible for personnel, the collection of tax monies, budget development, operation and expenditure of money for the Library's development, operation and maintenance. The Board usually meets on the third Monday of the month at 6:15 p.m. in the Founders Room of the Library. Meeting dates may vary for holidays and summer break. The public is welcome to attend.

The first board to serve was made up of Allan Littman, Margaret Jones, Leonard Rogers, Carol Forell, Richard Rozen, Sharon Bass and Charles Auerbach.

The current board is composed of Jeff Foran, Tom Gram, Fredric Postle, Tom Cromwell, George Bo-Linn, Niran Amir, and Bill Smith.

The Belvedere Tiburon Library Foundation

The Belvedere Tiburon Library Foundation is the library's fundraising partner and advocate. The foundation is responsible for various popular events throughout the year that raise funds to support the library and its mission:

- Blackie’s Hay Day, an old fashioned country fair with pony rides, relay races, toy tractor rides, carnival games, jumpies, a climbing wall, a petting zoo as well as entertainment and food
- Gently Used Art Auction, a bi-annual silent art auction
- Petrocelli Luncheon, an annual event featuring a book talk by Elaine Petrocelli, owner of the Book Passage bookstores
- Wreath Silent Auction, an auction of wreaths created by local designers as a benefit for the library
- Teddy Bear Tea, a children's tea with cocoa, food, and treats

== Collection ==
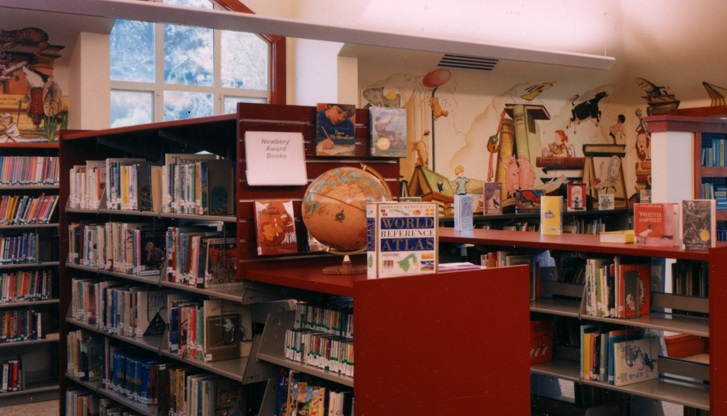
view of children's room collection

The library collection consists of over 200,000 books, periodicals, CDs, DVDs, and audio books in print and electronic formats. The library also boasts a robust digital library of research databases, ebooks, emagazines, and streaming videos.

== Services ==
The library offers a portfolio of services that strengthen and advance its mission. Some popular services are:

- 3D Printing
- Lending eReaders
- Lending Rokus
- Homebound delivery
- Museum passes
- Notary service

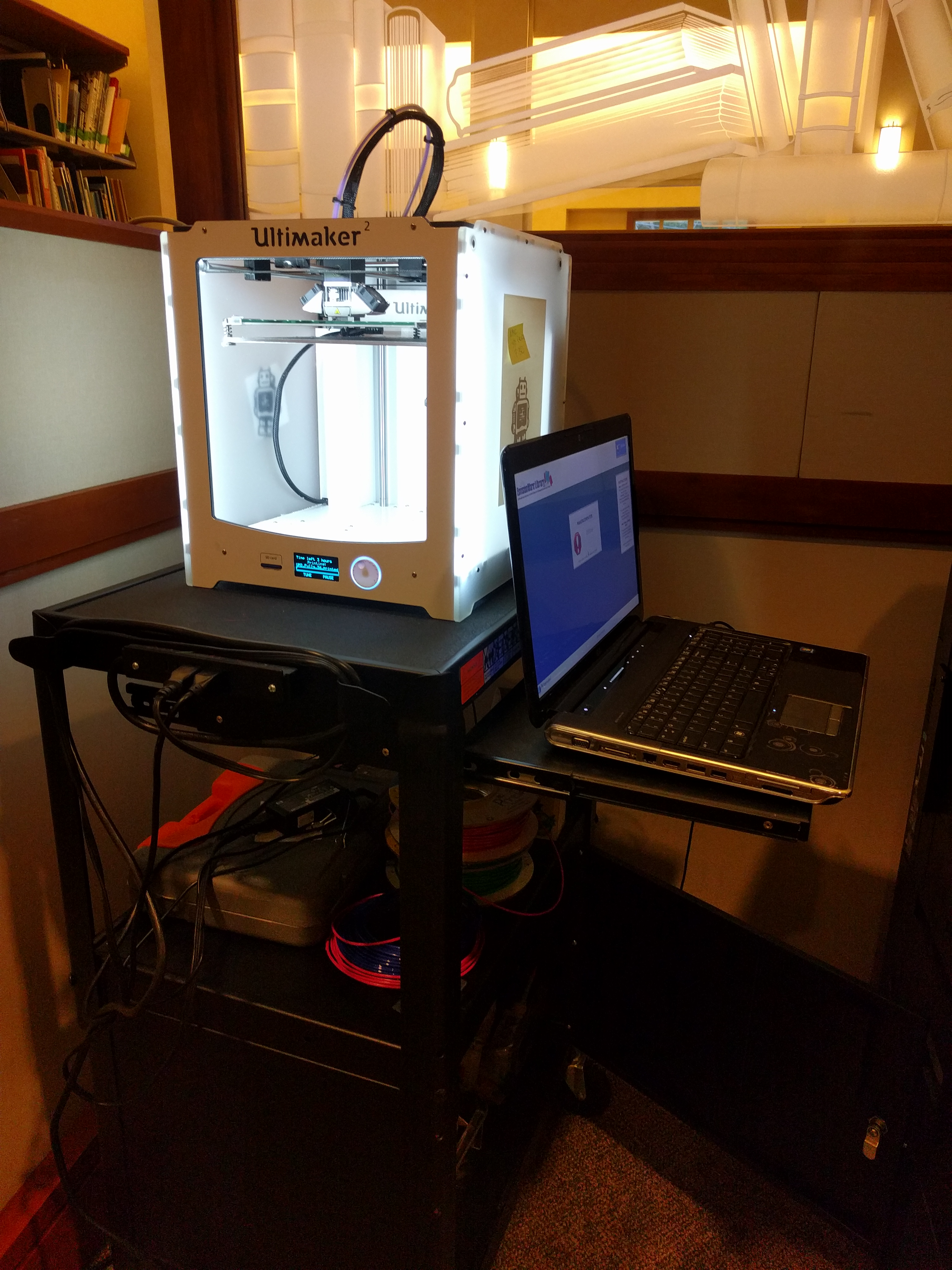
3D printing at the library

== See also ==
- Marin County Free Library
- Sausalito Library
