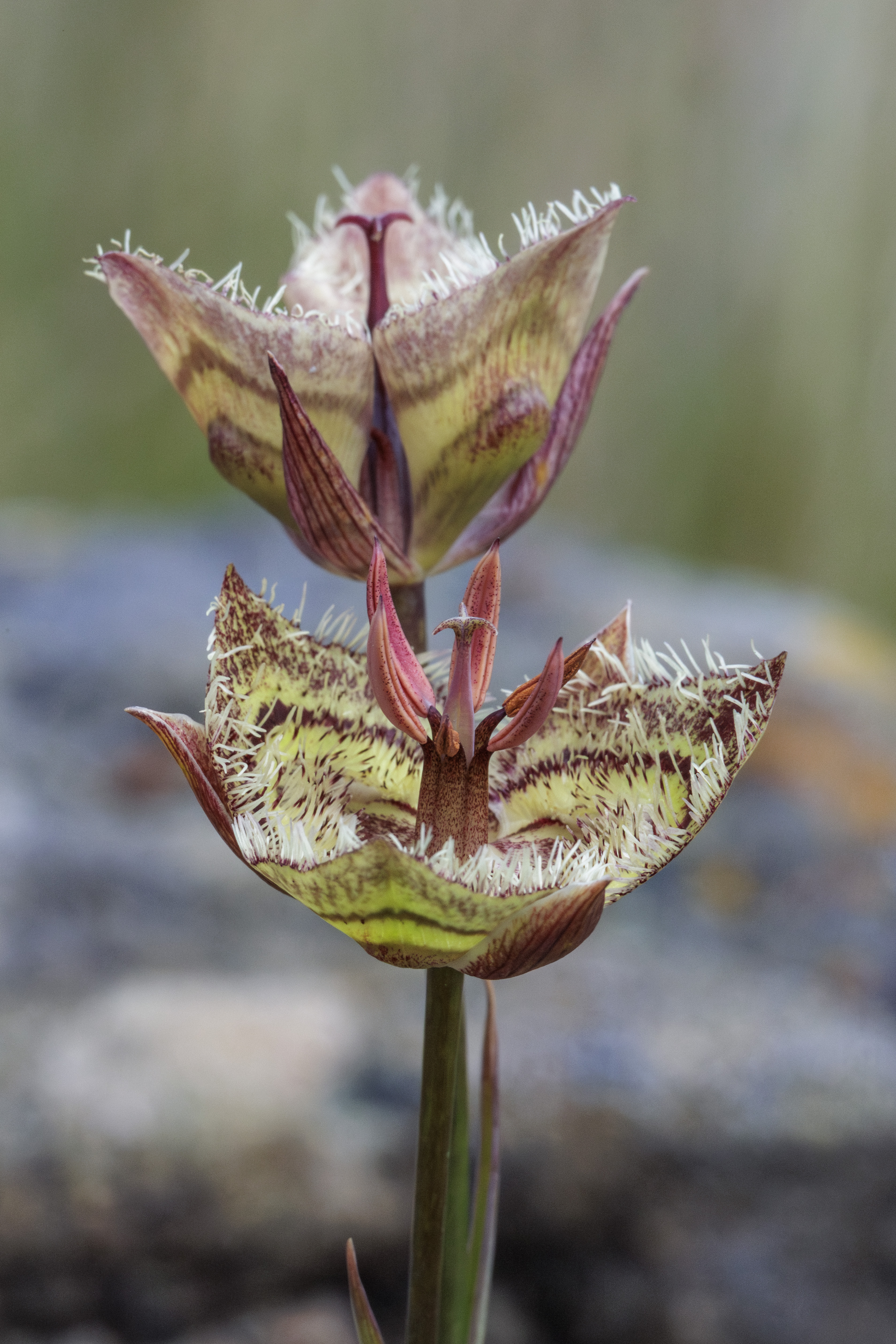

Conservation status
- Critically Imperiled (NatureServe)

Scientific classification
- Kingdom: Plantae
- Clade: Embryophytes
- Clade: Tracheophytes
- Clade: Spermatophytes
- Clade: Angiosperms
- Clade: Monocots
- Order: Liliales
- Family: Liliaceae
- Genus: Calochortus
- Species: C. tiburonensis

Binomial name
- Calochortus tiburonensis A.J.Hill

= Calochortus tiburonensis =

Species of flowering plant

Calochortus tiburonensis, the Tiburon mariposa lily, is a rare member of the genus Calochortus in the family Liliaceae. It is only grows in Marin County, California, where it is known only from one population on Ring Mountain east of Mill Valley.

== Description ==
The Tiburon Mariposa lily is a perennial growing from a bulb that produces a flowering stem 10 to 60 centimeters (4–24 in) tall, usually branched. Each plant has a lone, flat basal leaf 10 to 70 cm (4–28 in) long, with one or more smaller leaves attached to the stem with successive leaves getting smaller further up. The basal leaf can be as wide as 1.7 cm; it emerges with the winter rains in mid-December. Underground, the bulb is egg-shaped with a fibrous covering in larger plants.

Flowering occurs in late spring to early summer, May and June. Tiburon Mariposa lilies can produce one to eight flowers per plant, but usually have two or three flowers, with only very small plants producing a single bloom. The flowers are bell shaped with three pointed petals atop the erect flowering stem. The ciliate, light yellow-green petals are streaked with purplish-brown. When mature, ovaries form a capsule full of small, dark brown seeds.

== Taxonomy ==
Calochortus tiburonensis was scientifically described and named by Albert Joseph Hill in 1973. Hill was at the time a physician from the San Francisco Bay area and an amateur botanist. The species is part of the genus Calochortus which is classified in the Liliaceae family. The first recorded observation of the species was by Robert West, but the person that reported it to Hill inspiring his investigation was Annetta Carter. Carter had seen the species at a later date in company with Mrs. J. C. Youngberg and Mrs. George Ellman. The type specimen was collected by Hill on 19 June 1972. The relatively late description of the species in the later half of the 1900s despite its habitat being quite near the Golden Gate Bridge is unusual, considering the developed nature of the area.

=== Names ===
Calochortus tiburonensis is known by the common name Tiburon mariposa lily, less frequently it is also called the Tiburon mariposa tulip.

== Range and habitat ==
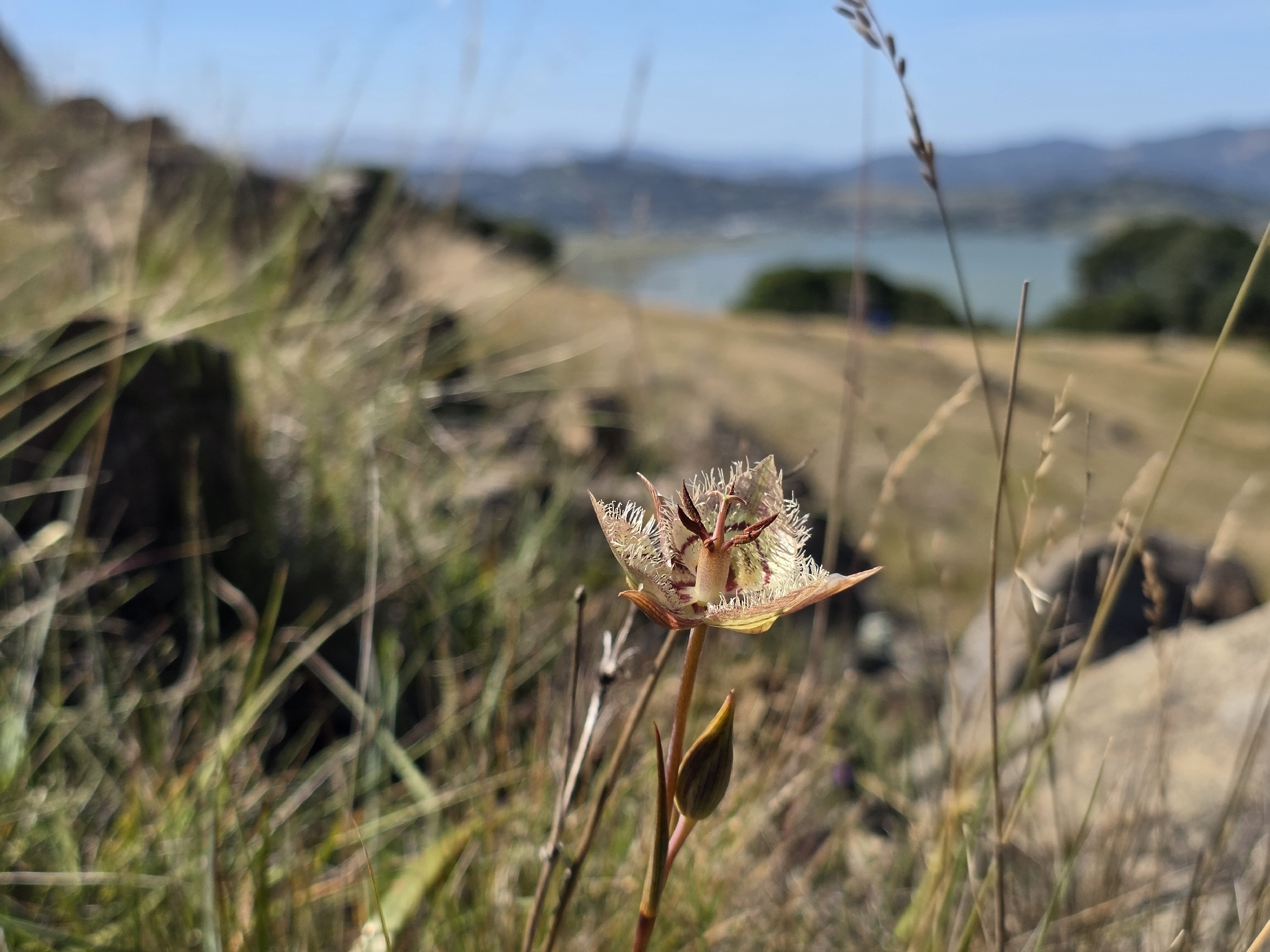
On a grassy hillside with a bay in the distance

Tiburon mariposa lilies are endemic to the Ring Mountain Preserve in the northern part of the Tiburon Peninsula in Marin County. There are three populations of the plant that grow in rocky areas of serpentinite or on soils derived from serpentinite. It is associated with the serpentine bunchgrass community growing alongside serpentine reedgrass (Calamagrostis ophitidis), Tiburon buckwheat (Eriogonum luteolum var. caninum), purple needlegrass (Stipa pulchra), Tiburon paintbrush (Castilleja affinis ssp. neglecta), and Marin dwarf flax (Hesperolinon congestum).

== Conservation ==
The plant was federally listed as a threatened species in 1995. It is considered threatened due to loss of surrounding habitat to recreational activities, to competition from invasive plant species, to its proximity to a dense population center, and to its confinement to a single population of plants. It is protected along with a number of other rare serpentine soils endemic plants that grow on and around Ring Mountain.

The plant has probably always been rare and limited to its current distribution on the Ring Mountain outcrop. A 1991 estimate placed the total population size at about 40,000 individuals. While the land is protected, the flora upon it are still vulnerable to events such as wildfires or drought, and to damage from off-leash dogs, hikers, cyclists, vandals, and wildflower collectors. The species would be difficult to preserve away from its natural habitat as attempts to grow it in gardens have usually failed. When it was recognized as a species it was threatened by immediate plans to develop the area Ring Mountain. Local residents formed the Save Ring Mountain Committee to advocate for preservation and allow for the purchase of the area by The Nature Conservancy, the first 29 hectares (72 acres) at the top of the mountain being purchased in 1981. The land was transferred to the Marin County Open Space District in November 1995.
