= Schreckensteinia felicella =

Scientific classification
- Kingdom: Animalia
- Phylum: Arthropoda
- Class: Insecta
- Order: Lepidoptera
- Family: Schreckensteiniidae
- Genus: Schreckensteinia
- Species: S. felicella

Binomial name
- Schreckensteinia felicella (Walsingham, 1880)

Synonyms
- Chrysocorys felicella Walsingham, 1880

Moth species in family Schreckensteiniidae

Schreckensteinia felicella is a moth of the family Schreckensteiniidae. It is found in western North America, including and possibly limited to California.

The wingspan is 10–12 mm.

The larvae feed on Castilleja affinis.
