= Paradise Cay, California =

Unincorporated community in California, United States

Paradise Cay County Service Area No. 29
- Unincorporated community
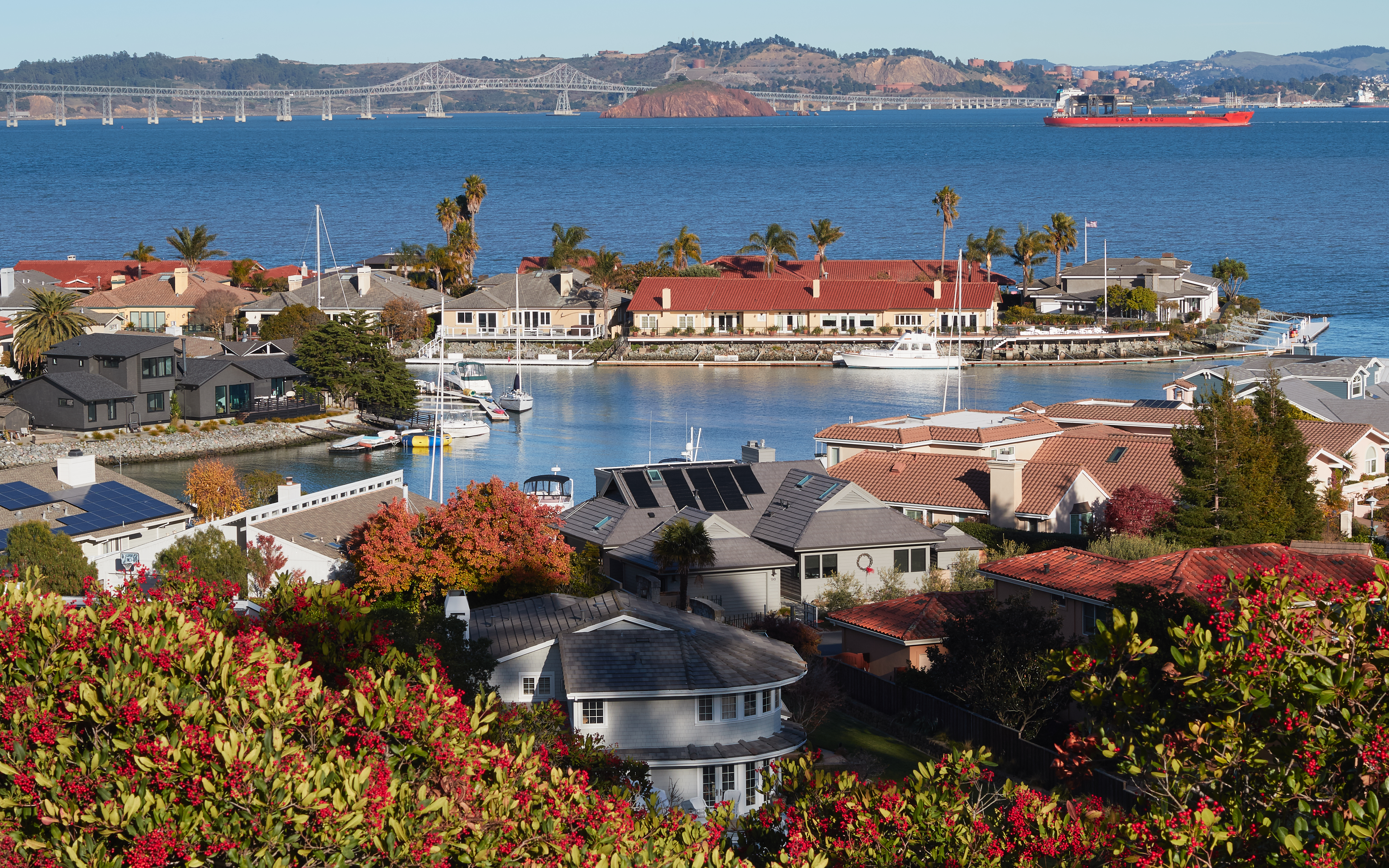
- A view of Paradise Cay near Tiburon

- Location in California
- Coordinates: 37°54′46″N 122°28′32″W
- Country: United States
- State: California
- County: Marin
- Elevation: 23 ft (7 m)

Paradise Cay, also known as County Service Area No. 29, is an unincorporated enclave, surrounded by the town of Tiburon in Marin County, California, United States, located 2 miles (3 km) south of Point San Quentin at an elevation of 23 feet (7 m). The waterfront community lies at the foot of the Tiburon Peninsula south of Corte Madera Creek along the San Francisco Bay. The community is in ZIP code 94920 and area code 415.

== History ==
In the 1960s, the community was built as one of the last landfills allowed in San Francisco Bay. To many people who reside in Paradise Cay, it is known as "Moseleyville." The community was developed by patriarch Tim Moseley. Currently, his son Tom Moseley, his grandson Jeff Moseley, and Jonny Moseley (who won a gold medal in the 1998 Winter Olympics), and other family members all reside in their own respective homes in Paradise Cay, which includes just over 200 homes (Belvedere-Tiburon zip code 94920). Many of Paradise Cay's homes have docks that can accommodate a 60-foot (18 m) yacht. Located along the community's north end is Tiburon Yacht Club, formerly called Paradise Yacht Club.

Paradise Cay is situated close to Triangle Marsh, a location of considerable biological productivity. To the south is the Tiburon Peninsula, which is dominated by Ring Mountain; Ring Mountain itself includes extensive floral biodiversity and Native American petroglyphs.

== Politics ==
In the state legislature, Paradise Cay is in the 3rd Senate District, and in the 6th Assembly District. Federally, Paradise Cay is in California's 2nd congressional district, represented by Democrat Jared Huffman.

== Notable people ==
- Robin Williams (1951–2014), American stand-up comedian and actor, died in his Paradise Cay home.
