= Ptilosticha cyanoplaca =

Scientific classification
- Kingdom: Animalia
- Phylum: Arthropoda
- Class: Insecta
- Order: Lepidoptera
- Family: Schreckensteiniidae
- Genus: Ptilosticha
- Species: P. cyanoplaca

Binomial name
- Ptilosticha cyanoplaca Meyrick, 1910

Moth species in family Schreckensteiniidae

Ptilosticha cyanoplaca is a moth in the family Schreckensteiniidae. It was described by Edward Meyrick in 1910.
