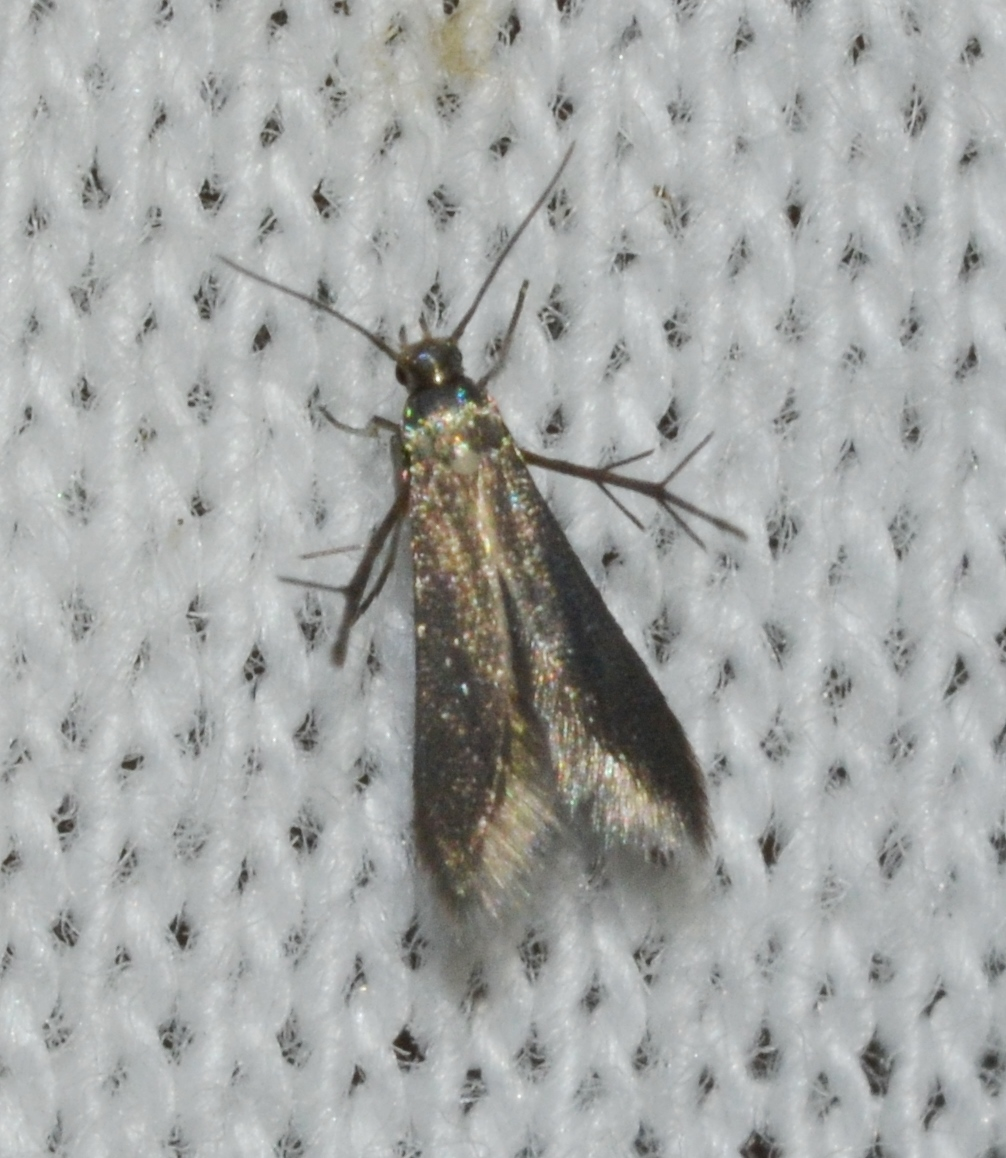

Scientific classification
- Kingdom: Animalia
- Phylum: Arthropoda
- Class: Insecta
- Order: Lepidoptera
- Family: Schreckensteiniidae
- Genus: Schreckensteinia
- Species: S. erythriella

Binomial name
- Schreckensteinia erythriella (Clemens, 1860)

= Schreckensteinia erythriella =

Moth species in family Schreckensteiniidae

Schreckensteinia erythriella is a moth of the family Schreckensteiniidae. It is found in north-eastern North America.

The wingspan is 10–12 mm.

The larvae feed on the flowers or fruits of Rhus species.
