= Schreckensteinia inferiorella =

Scientific classification
- Domain: Eukaryota
- Kingdom: Animalia
- Phylum: Arthropoda
- Class: Insecta
- Order: Lepidoptera
- Family: Schreckensteiniidae
- Genus: Schreckensteinia
- Species: S. inferiorella

Binomial name
- Schreckensteinia inferiorella Zeller, 1877

Moth species in family Schreckensteiniidae

Schreckensteinia inferiorella is a moth in the family Schreckensteiniidae. It was described by Philipp Christoph Zeller in 1877.
