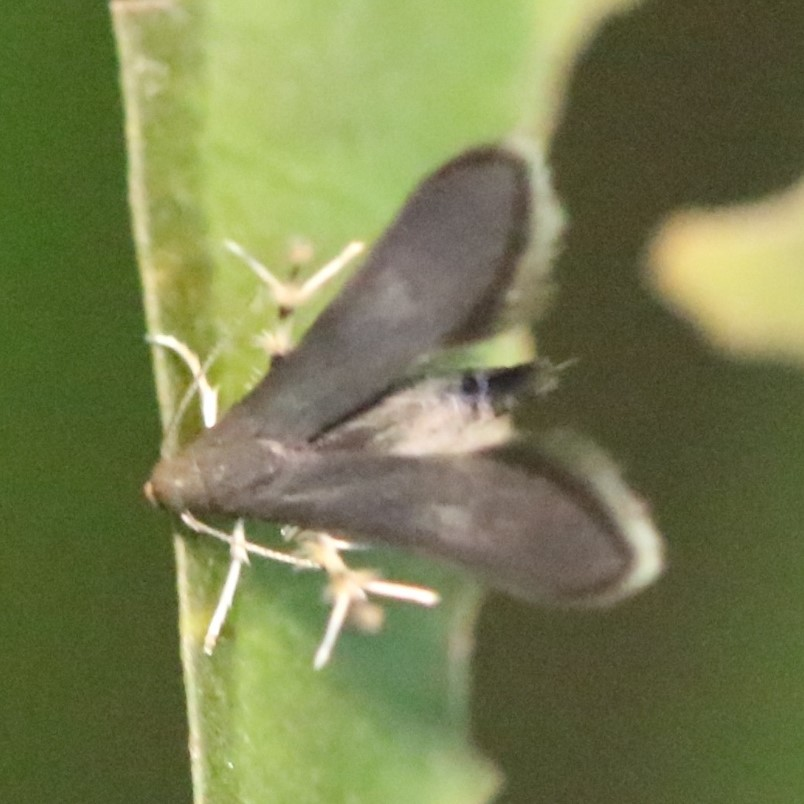

Scientific classification
- Kingdom: Animalia
- Phylum: Arthropoda
- Clade: Pancrustacea
- Class: Insecta
- Order: Lepidoptera
- Family: Schreckensteiniidae
- Genus: Corsocasis
- Species: C. coronias

Binomial name
- Corsocasis coronias Meyrick, 1912

= Corsocasis coronias =

Moth species in family Schreckensteiniidae

Corsocasis coronias is a species of moth in the family Schreckensteiniidae. It was first described by Edward Meyrick in 1912.
