= Schreckensteinia jocularis =

Scientific classification
- Domain: Eukaryota
- Kingdom: Animalia
- Phylum: Arthropoda
- Class: Insecta
- Order: Lepidoptera
- Family: Schreckensteiniidae
- Genus: Schreckensteinia
- Species: S. jocularis

Binomial name
- Schreckensteinia jocularis Walsingham, 1914

Moth species in family Schreckensteiniidae

Schreckensteinia jocularis is a moth in the family Schreckensteiniidae. It was described by Thomas de Grey in 1914.
