= Corsocasis gastrozona =

Scientific classification
- Domain: Eukaryota
- Kingdom: Animalia
- Phylum: Arthropoda
- Class: Insecta
- Order: Lepidoptera
- Family: Schreckensteiniidae
- Genus: Corsocasis
- Species: C. gastrozona

Binomial name
- Corsocasis gastrozona Meyrick, 1932

Moth species in family Schreckensteiniidae

Corsocasis gastrozona is a moth in the family Schreckensteiniidae. It was described by Edward Meyrick in 1932.
