= Ptilosticha bimaculata =

Scientific classification
- Kingdom: Animalia
- Phylum: Arthropoda
- Class: Insecta
- Order: Lepidoptera
- Family: Schreckensteiniidae
- Genus: Ptilosticha
- Species: P. bimaculata

Binomial name
- Ptilosticha bimaculata Walsingham, 1889

Moth species in family Schreckensteiniidae

Ptilosticha bimaculata is a moth in the family Schreckensteiniidae. It was described by Walsingham in 1889.
