= Ptilosticha incandescens =

Scientific classification
- Kingdom: Animalia
- Phylum: Arthropoda
- Class: Insecta
- Order: Lepidoptera
- Family: Schreckensteiniidae
- Genus: Ptilosticha
- Species: P. incandescens

Binomial name
- Ptilosticha incandescens Meyrick, 1910

Moth species in the family Schreckensteiniidae

Ptilosticha incandescens is a moth in the family Schreckensteiniidae. It was described by Edward Meyrick in 1910.
