= Corsocasis cryptosema =

Scientific classification
- Domain: Eukaryota
- Kingdom: Animalia
- Phylum: Arthropoda
- Class: Insecta
- Order: Lepidoptera
- Family: Schreckensteiniidae
- Genus: Corsocasis
- Species: C. cryptosema

Binomial name
- Corsocasis cryptosema Meyrick, 1929

Moth species in family Schreckensteiniidae

Corsocasis cryptosema is a moth in the family Schreckensteiniidae. It was described by Edward Meyrick in 1929.
