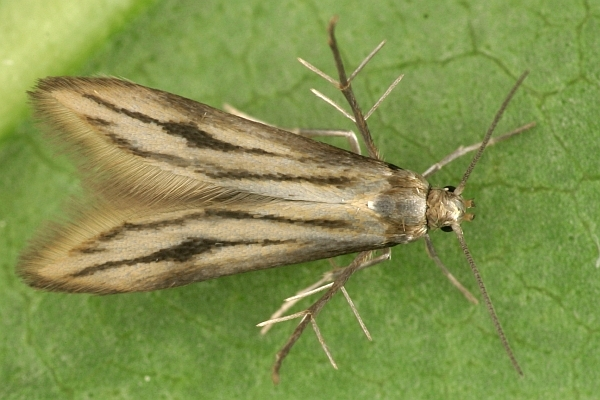

Scientific classification
- Domain: Eukaryota
- Kingdom: Animalia
- Phylum: Arthropoda
- Class: Insecta
- Order: Lepidoptera
- Family: Schreckensteiniidae
- Genus: Schreckensteinia
- Species: S. festaliella

Binomial name
- Schreckensteinia festaliella (Hübner, [1819])

Synonyms
- Tinea festaliella Hübner, [1819]; Chrysocorus angustipennella Curtis, 1833

= Schreckensteinia festaliella =

Blackberry skeletonizer

Moth species in family Schreckensteiniidae

Schreckensteinia festaliella, the blackberry skeletonizer, is a moth of the family Schreckensteiniidae first described by Jacob Hübner in 1819. It is found in the Palearctic including Europe and has been introduced to North America

== Description ==
The moth's wingspan is 10–12 mm. The head is pale metallic bronzy-ochreous. Forewings are pale shining ochreous; base and costa suffused with fuscous; a dark fuscous streak from base along fold to tornus, thence along termen nearly to apex; a dark fuscous median longitudinal streak from before 1/3 of disc to costa close before apex, at 2/5 enlarged into a spot, which tends to form a fascia with dark costal and tornal suffusion. Hindwings are dark grey. The larva is pale green; dorsal line darker head and plate of 2 green.

== Biology ==
There are two or three generations and adults are on wing from March to September. The imago is active by day and rests on its forelegs and mid-legs only, with the hindlegs raised over the abdomen. It is occasionally attracted to light.

Eggs are laid singly on either side of a leaf, near the margin, or on a petiole of bramble (Rubus fruticosus) and raspberry (Rubus idaeus). When hatching the larvae are colourless and chew through the top of the egg, leaving the rest uneaten. They soon become green matching the colour of their foodplant and live on the upper side of a leaf under a slight web, occasionally moving to a fresh leaf. The pupa ia initially green and darkens with successive colour changes before becoming iridescent. It is in an open network cocoon which is attached to a stem; often low down.

== Distribution ==
It is native to the Palearctic, but was introduced to North America and is now widespread from California and Alberta to Quebec and the north-eastern United States.
