= Ptilosticha =

Scientific classification
- Kingdom: Animalia
- Phylum: Arthropoda
- Class: Insecta
- Order: Lepidoptera
- Family: Schreckensteiniidae
- Genus: Ptilosticha; Meyrick, 1910

Moth genus in family Schreckensteiniidae

Ptilosticha is a genus of moths in the family Schreckensteiniidae. It was erected by Edward Meyrick in 1910.

== Species ==
- Ptilosticha bimaculata Walsingham, 1889
- Ptilosticha cyanoplaca Meyrick, 1910
- Ptilosticha incandescens Meyrick, 1910
