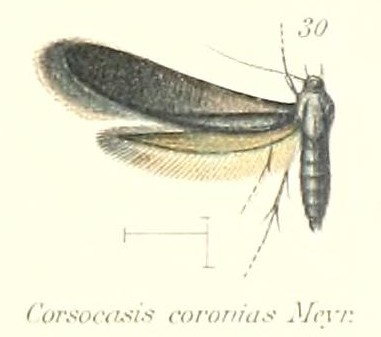
- Corsocasis coronias

Scientific classification
- Domain: Eukaryota
- Kingdom: Animalia
- Phylum: Arthropoda
- Class: Insecta
- Order: Lepidoptera
- Family: Schreckensteiniidae
- Genus: Corsocasis; Meyrick, 1912

= Corsocasis =

Moth genus in family Schreckensteiniidae

Corsocasis is a genus of moths in the family Schreckensteiniidae. The species of this genus are found in South-East Asia.

== Species ==
- Corsocasis coronias Meyrick, 1912 (from Japan and Taiwan)
- Corsocasis cryptosema Meyrick, 1929
- Corsocasis gastrozona Meyrick, 1932
