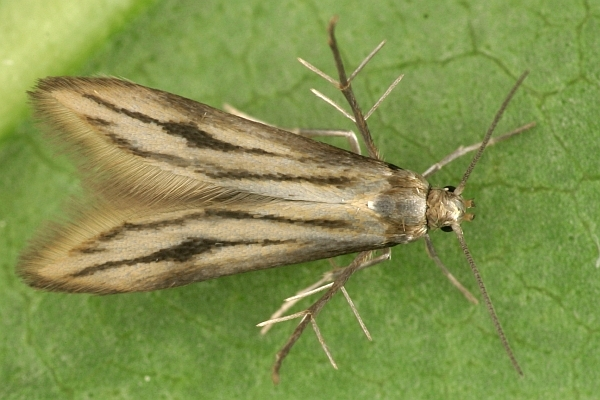
- Schreckensteinia festaliella

Scientific classification
- Domain: Eukaryota
- Kingdom: Animalia
- Phylum: Arthropoda
- Class: Insecta
- Order: Lepidoptera
- Family: Schreckensteiniidae
- Genus: Schreckensteinia; Jacob Hübner, 1825

= Schreckensteinia =

Moth genus in family Schreckensteiniidae

Schreckensteinia is a moth in the family Schreckensteiniidae.

== Species ==
- Schreckensteinia erythriella Clemens, 1860
- Schreckensteinia felicella Walsingham, 1880
- Schreckensteinia festaliella Hübner, 1819
- Schreckensteinia inferiorella Zeller, 1877
- Schreckensteinia jocularis Walsingham, 1914
