= Euhomalocera =

Scientific classification
- Domain: Eukaryota
- Kingdom: Animalia
- Phylum: Arthropoda
- Class: Insecta
- Order: Lepidoptera
- Family: Schreckensteiniidae
- Genus: Euhomalocera; Diakonoff, [1968]
- Species: E. heliosema

Binomial name
- Euhomalocera heliosema Diakonoff, [1968]

Monotypic moth genus in family Schreckensteiniidae

Euhomalocera is a genus of moths in the family Schreckensteiniidae. It contains the species Euhomalocera heliosema, which is found in the Philippines (Mindanao).

16 mm. The forewings are black with strong purple reflections except on the broad dull edges to the markings. The markings are bright yellow. There is a rather slender semiclavate longitudinal median mark from beyond the base to one-third of the wing, its anterior end touching a shorter wedge-shaped parallel streak above the preceding. There is a streak along the dorsum from well beyond the base to before the tornus, containing a semi-oval spot of ground color on one-fourth of the dorsum. This streak is gently narrowed posteriorly, but on the middle of the dorsum dilated into a triangle with the acute top reaching the middle of the disc. There is also an elongate-triangular patch on the costa occupying less than its third fourth, the anterior edge little, the posterior strongly oblique, the top to the closing vein. There is a longitudinal stripe from the closing vein, below the middle of the wing, furcate posteriorly, a narrow line above and beyond it and another, shorter, below it. The hindwings are deep blackish brown with purple reflections.
