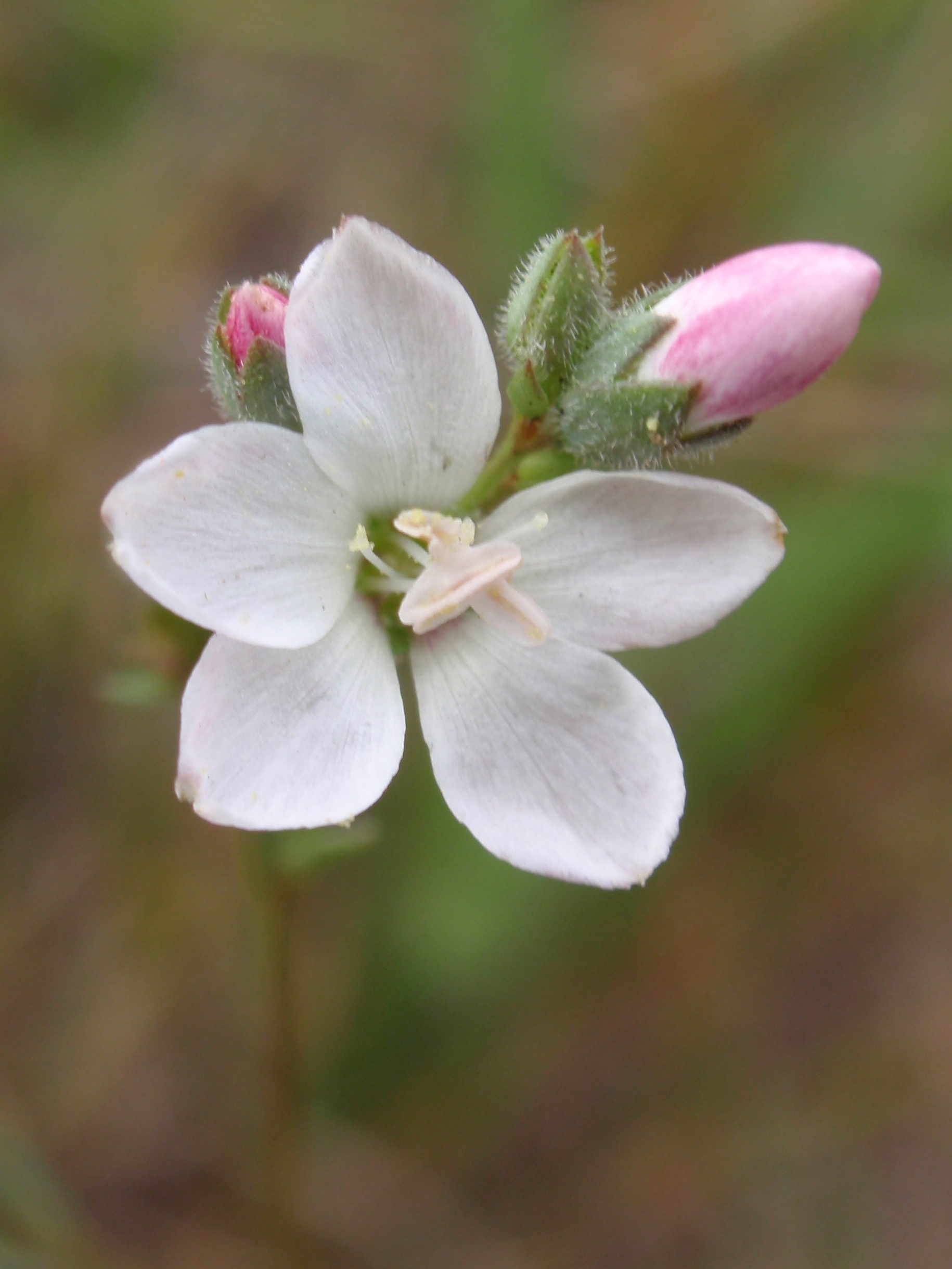

Conservation status
- Threatened (ESA)

Scientific classification
- Kingdom: Plantae
- Clade: Tracheophytes
- Clade: Angiosperms
- Clade: Eudicots
- Clade: Rosids
- Order: Malpighiales
- Family: Linaceae
- Genus: Hesperolinon
- Species: H. congestum

Binomial name
- Hesperolinon congestum (A. Gray) Small

= Hesperolinon congestum =

Species of flowering plant

Hesperolinon congestum, or Marin dwarf flax, is an annual herb, which is known to occur only in San Mateo, San Francisco and Marin County, California, United States. This plant occurs chiefly on serpentine soils, especially in dry native bunch grasses, chaparral or other grasslands at elevations less than 200 meters. The flowers are congested at the tips of the dichotomously branching stems. H. congestum is in flower between April and July. The outlook for this plant depends on survival of only about twenty small colonies, most of which are not actively managed for protection, even though the species is federally and state-listed as threatened. This species is also less commonly known as Marin western flax.

== Description ==
Stems of this wildflower vary between five and fifteen centimeters in length, with linear leaves manifesting alternately. The leaves are typically not planar and not clasping, and stipule glands are well developed with red exudate. Inflorescences are dense, with cymes characteristically open and 0.5 to 8.0 millimeter pedicels somewhat thread-like and ascending. The flower has five hairy sepals, which are three to four millimeters in size, whose margins are minutely glandular. Five petals are widely spreading between three and eight millimeters in dimension. These pink to rose colored petals each manifest three minute scales at the inner base; stamen dimensions vary between 5.5 and 7.0 millimeters. There are five stamens, and anthers are pink to deep purple. There exist six ovary chambers; the number of whitish styles is three. Fruits have a smooth surface exterior. Chromosomal characterization is: n=18.

== Taxonomy ==
Henry Nicholas Bolander was the first to collect and characterize Marin Dwarf Flax in the year 1863 in Marin County, during a project conducted by the California Geological Survey. Originally the new species was called Linum congestum by Asa Gray, although he described it in the section Hesperolinon within the same publication in the year 1865. It was J.K. Small who conveyed the discrete genus Hesperolinon to this plant in 1907.

By 1925 Jepson designated the genus Hesperolinon as a sector of the genus Linum and described Hesperolinon congestum as a subspecies of L. californicum. In 1961 Helen K. Sharsmith produced a definitive study of Hesperolinon, with the result that this taxon clearly merited genus standing; moreover, she also returned Marin Dwarf Flax, H. congestum to species status.

== Distribution ==
Collection and recognition of the species was made in the late 19th and early 20th centuries by botanical pioneers W.L. Jepson, Alice Eastwood and Katharine Brandegee. Most of these early sightings were made in Tiburon and San Francisco. In the mid-1900s recording arose in San Mateo County, principally in Redwood City (Edgewood Park) and in San Mateo

== Conservation ==
The State of California classified Marin Dwarf Flax as a threatened species in the year 1992, and the federal government listed this plant as threatened in 1995. In addition to the state of California and U.S. federal government protected designations, the California Native Plant Society has classified Marin Dwarf Flax: List 1B, R-E-D Code 3-3-3ru. In 2006 the Pacific Gas and Electric Company announced a program that has the potential for further reducing the habitat and population of H. congestum and a number of other listed species.

In these activities Pacific Gas and Electric announced it would destroy or modify over 500,000 acres (2,000 km^{2}) of habitat in California, some of which is known habitat for H. congestum. It is indicated that a full Environmental Impact Report would be prepared for public review prior to any of the proposed actions. The most destructive element of this proposed program is the use of herbicide to effect a kill of virtually all vegetation in large areas of power line rights-of-way.

Ring Mountain in Marin County, California is a location of occurrence of H. congestum; in fact the sole population that is actively managed is found on Ring Mountain, a nature reserve on the Tiburon Peninsula managed by The Nature Conservancy.

Many of the existing colonies are in San Mateo County; two of these in the vicinity of the Crystal Springs Reservoir are in danger of destruction by an expanded trail system proposed by the county. The proposed Jefferson-Martin 230 kV transmission line, running from San Francisco to north San Mateo County, would traverse and impact known habitat of Marin Dwarf Flax.

In 2014, a previous unknown population on serpentine habitat within the Town of Woodside was discovered by Pacific Gas and Electric when a gas pipeline was being replaced between Farm Hill Blvd. and Woodside Road, east of I-280, and the project is destroying about 10% of the population, however, a restoration plan was written during construction of the pipeline, to try to mitigate the damages.

Prior to the discovery of the new population in Woodside, the California Natural Diversity Database listed a total of 27 populations—12 in Marin County, three in San Francisco (however, one of those populations is known to be extinct and at a second site, only a single plant seen in 1985) and 12 populations in San Mateo County.
