= Tiburon Peninsula (California) =

Peninsula of the Marin Peninsula in California, United States

Coordinates: 37°53′30″N 122°28′34″W

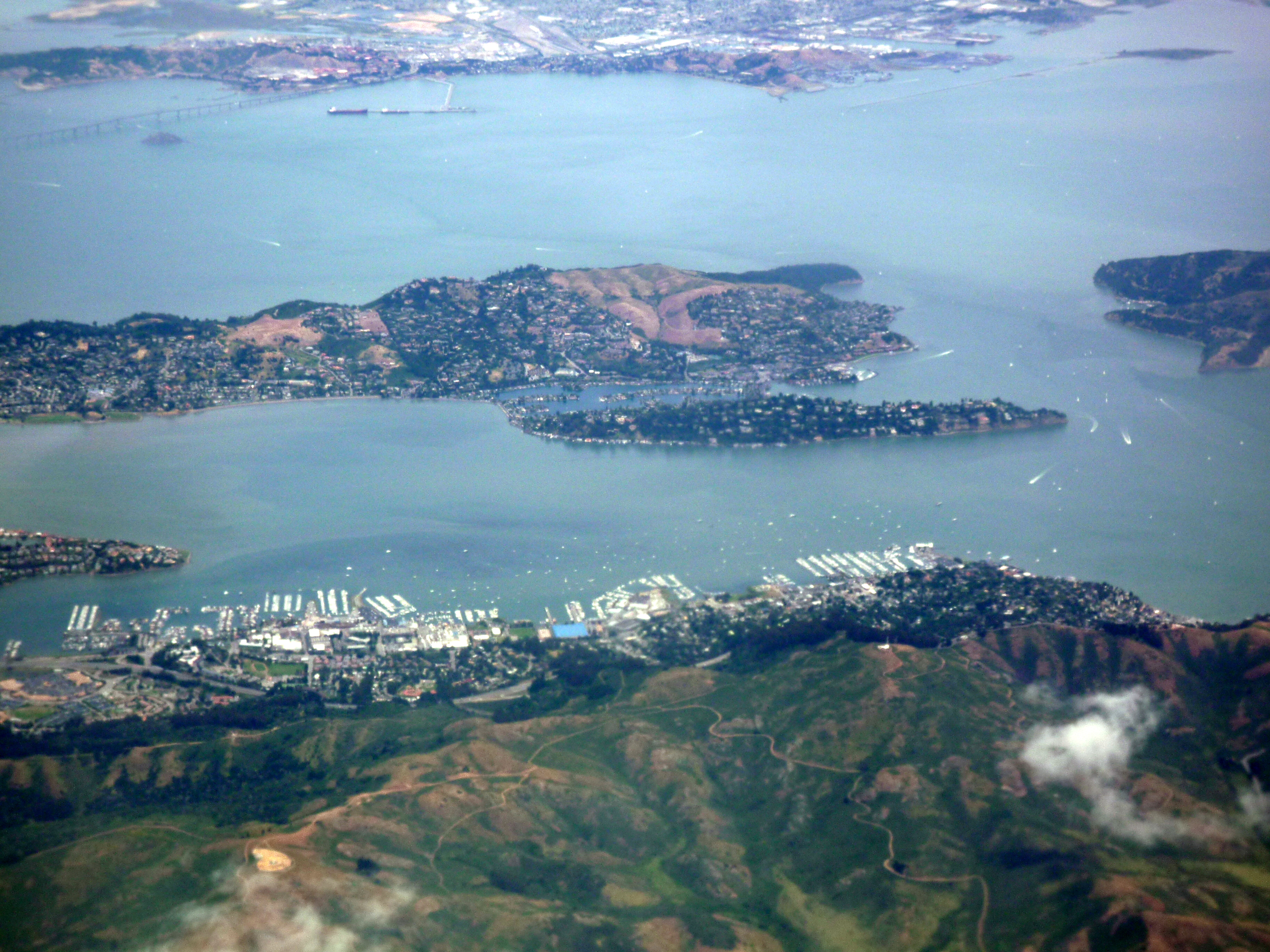
Aerial view of the Tiburon Peninsula

The Tiburon Peninsula is a landform of the San Francisco Bay Area's Marin County and is home to the incorporated municipalities of Tiburon, Belvedere, and a portion of Corte Madera, California. Much of the peninsula is unincorporated, including portions of the north side and the communities of Paradise Cay and Strawberry. Richardson Bay separates the peninsula from the Marin County mainland. Angel Island lies app. 1 mile south of the peninsula's southern tip. Much of the land area of the Tiburon Peninsula was part of a Spanish land grant originally given to the early Californian John Reed. A prominent feature of the Tiburon Peninsula is Ring Mountain, Marin County, which forms the backbone of the peninsula and is the highest elevation of the peninsula. The Tiburon Peninsula is the location of a number of rare and endangered flora species, and is also the site of ancient Native American rock carvings. The mineral lawsonite was first described from an occurrence on the Tiburon Peninsula.

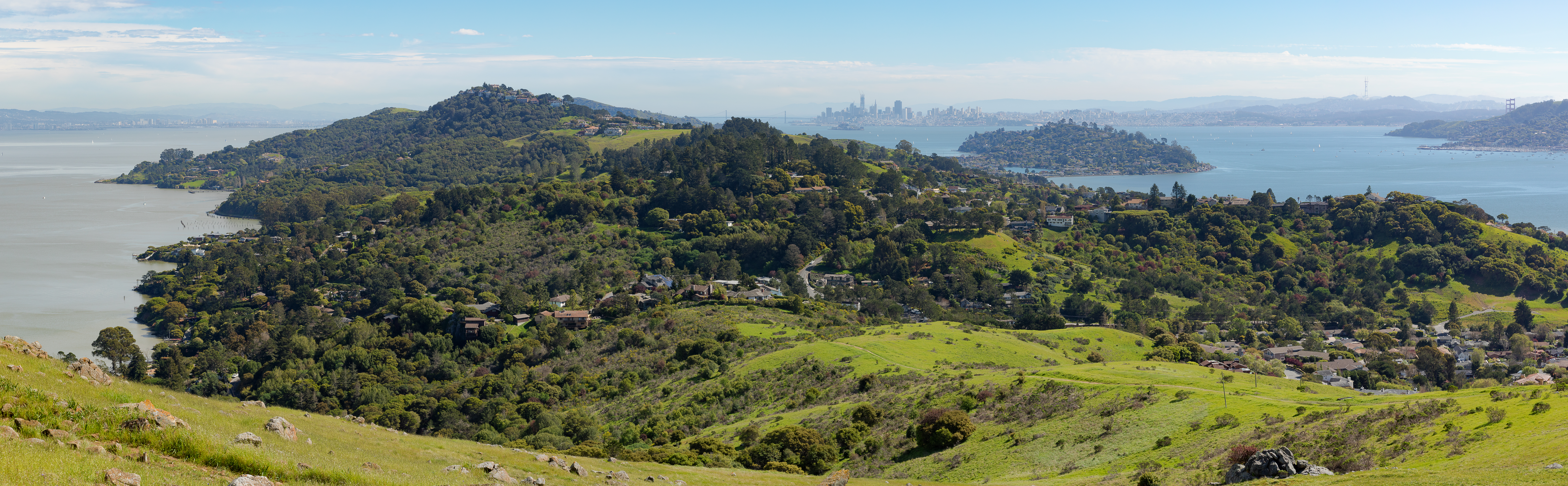
Tiburon Peninsula as seen from Ring Mountain in 2017

== See also ==
- Old Saint Hilary Church
- Triangle Marsh
