= Pecked curvilinear nucleated =

Form of prehistoric rock carving

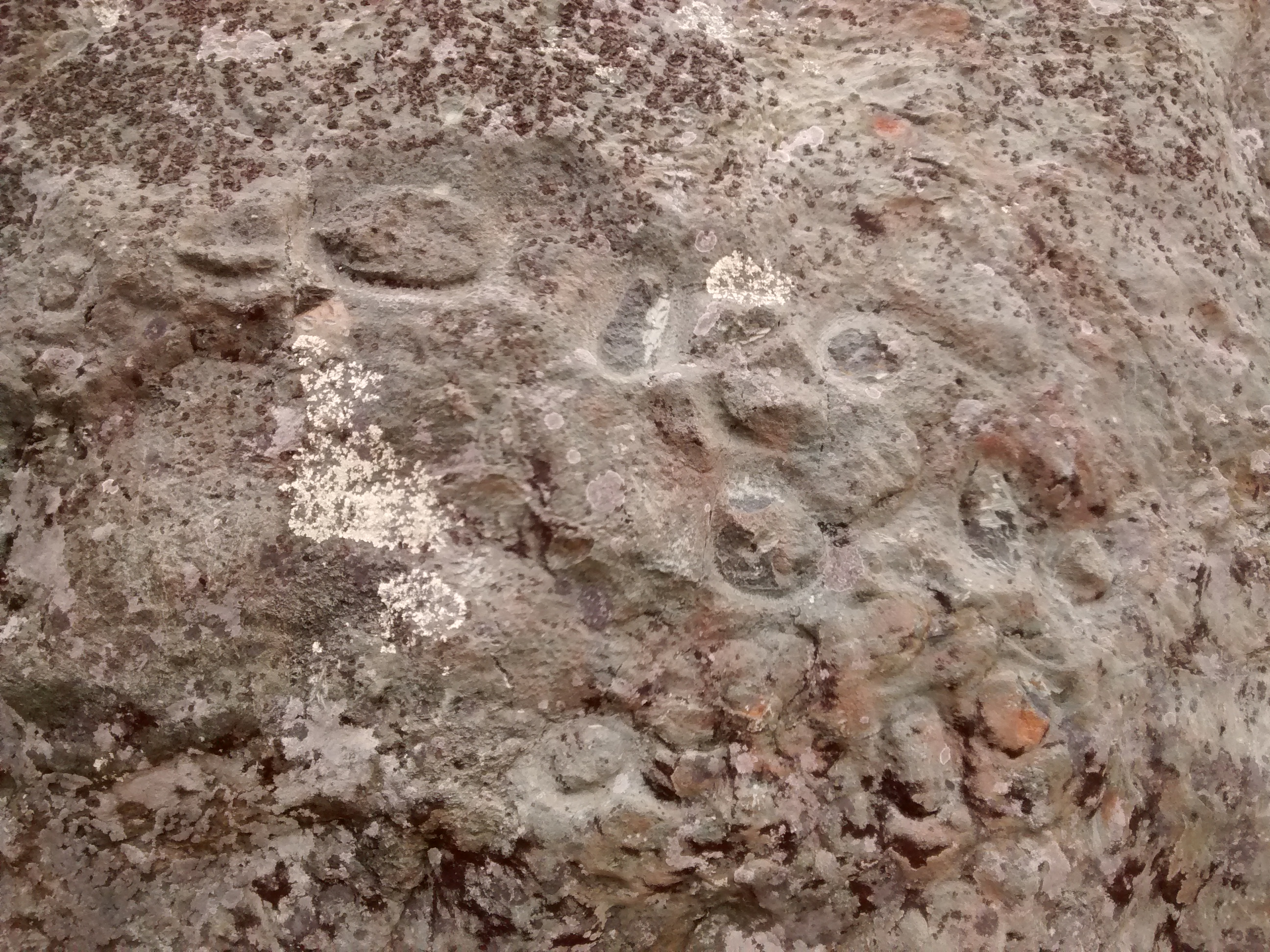
Pecked curvilinear nucleated petroglyphs on Ring Mountain, California

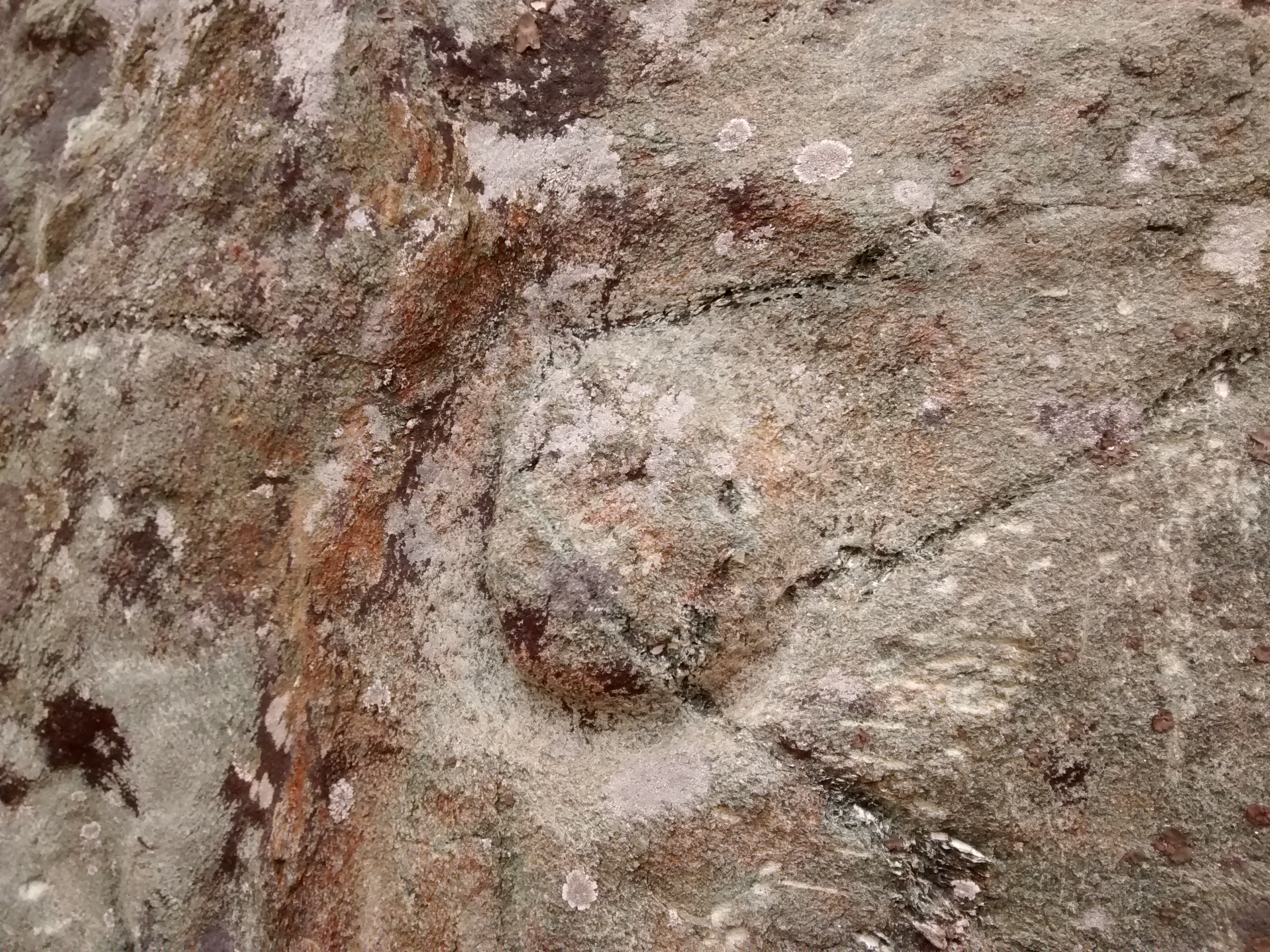
Close-up

Pecked curvilinear nucleated (PCN), in archaeology, is a form of prehistoric rock carving. The term was originally proposed by Teresa Miller and Reed Haslam in 1976 to describe a widespread type of rock carving in western North America. The form is characterized by a circular or oval groove element, which results in a raised center area. The form is quite prevalent in California and is applied to a number of Native American rock carving sites in this portion of the United States.

== Examples ==
Occurrences of this type of rock carving can be found at Ring Mountain, Marin County, California, and in Lakeport, California.

== See also ==
- Petroglyph
- Pictograph
