= Triangle Marsh =

Wetland and archaeological site in California

Coordinates: 37.922294°N 122.496657°W

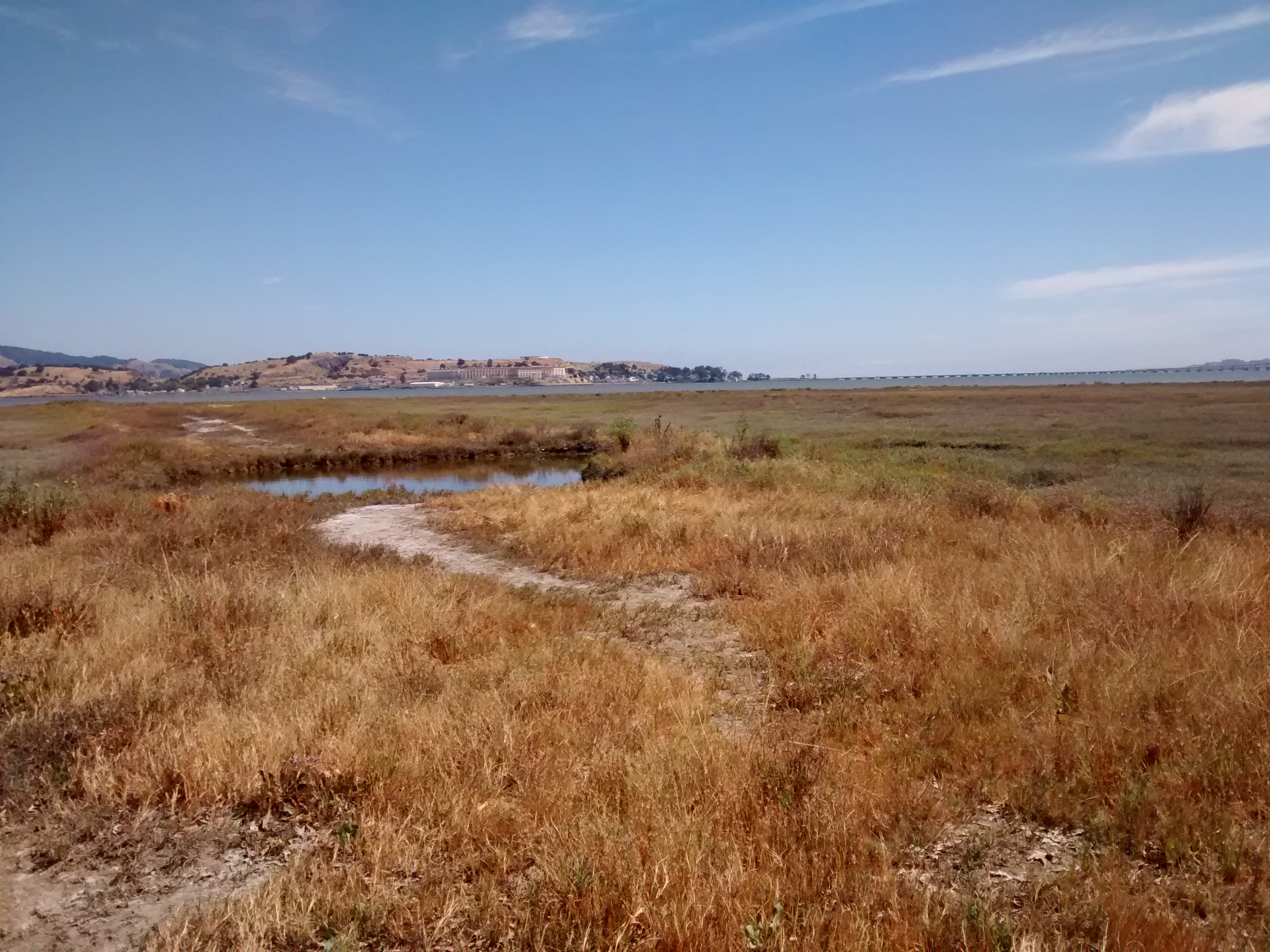
Triangle Marsh in summer 2016

Triangle Marsh is a wetland of the San Francisco Bay, situated at the base of Ring Mountain at the north end of the Tiburon Peninsula in Marin County, California.

Archaeological Pecked curvilinear nucleated petroglyphs, and recovery on Ring Mountain, hold significant evidence of Native American habitation and likely proof that early Miwok peoples exploited marine resources from Triangle Marsh.

The 31-acre (130,000 m^{2}) property is owned by the Marin branch of the National Audubon Society who restored upland and wetland habitats there with funding from a variety of sources. Federal endangered species, including the clapper rail and salt marsh harvest mouse, live in the Marsh.

== See also ==
- Strawberry Spit
- Class of 1918 Marsh
