= Ring Mountain (California) =

Mountain in United States of America

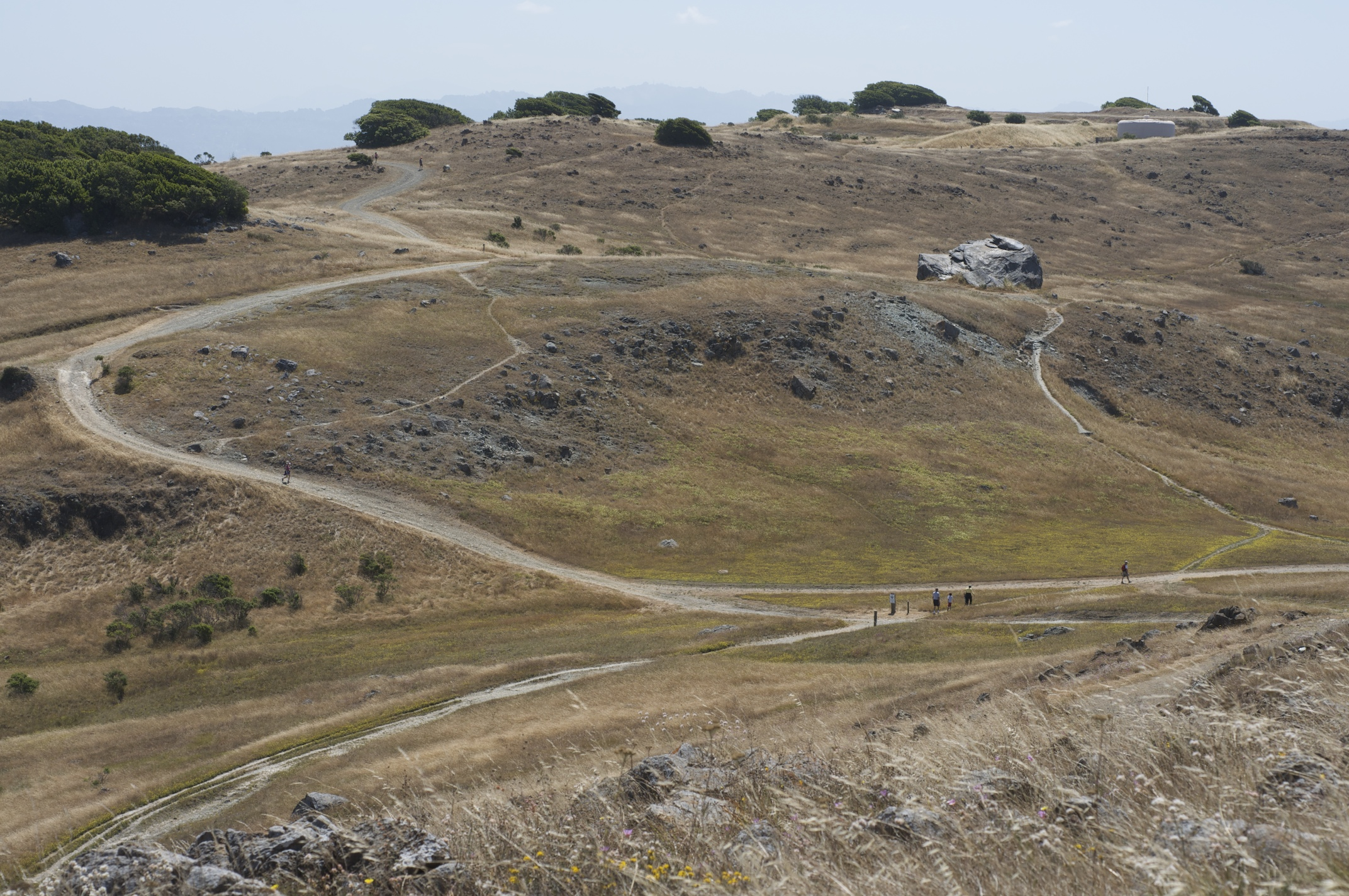

Highest point
- Elevation: 603 ft (184 m) NAVD 88
- Prominence: 402 ft (123 m)
- Coordinates: 37°54′35″N 122°29′09″W

Geography
- Location within California Location within the United States
- Location: Marin County, California, U.S.
- Topo map: USGS San Quentin

Ring Mountain is an elevated landform on the Tiburon Peninsula in Marin County, California. This mountain was named for George E. Ring, who served as a Marin County Supervisor from 1895 to 1903.

A number of rare and endangered plant species inhabit Ring Mountain. The mountain's twin summits consist of serpentinite, a rock which is very high in magnesium, producing soils of unusual chemistry (serpentine soil). The landscape is strewn with many sizable boulders which exhibit a variety of lithologies including high-pressure metamorphic rocks of amphibolite, blueschist, greenschist, and eclogite grade.

Native American pecked curvilinear nucleated petroglyphs created by the Coast Miwok people are also found here.

== History ==
=== The Coast Miwok ===
Ring Mountain is the ancestral home of the Coast Miwok, who maintain deep cultural ties to the land. Ring mountain has been protected as a public open space since 1981, being one of the most culturally significant landscapes in Marin County.

=== Naming of Ring Mountain ===
In 1834, Ring Mountain was acquired by the Reed family, though the mountain itself later became associated with George E. Ring. Ring, originally a dairyman who later became a Marin County Supervisor, acquired enough land on the Tiburon Peninsula to have his name affixed to the mountain.

=== Historical military presence ===
Ring Mountain remains largely undeveloped, however, during the Cold War in the 1950s, a military installation was built on its eastern peak, designed to house anti-aircraft guns. A remnant of this period is the presence of radiolarian chert, a type of red rock brought from the Marin Headlands for use in the installation. The installment was decommissioned in the 1960s, leaving behind these rocks to this day.

=== Conservation efforts ===
In the mid-1960s, the Reed family's descendants ceased cattle and horse grazing on Ring Mountain and sold over 400 acres to a developer, sparking a movement to protect the land from further development. This led to a years-long campaign to preserve the mountain as a protected open space.

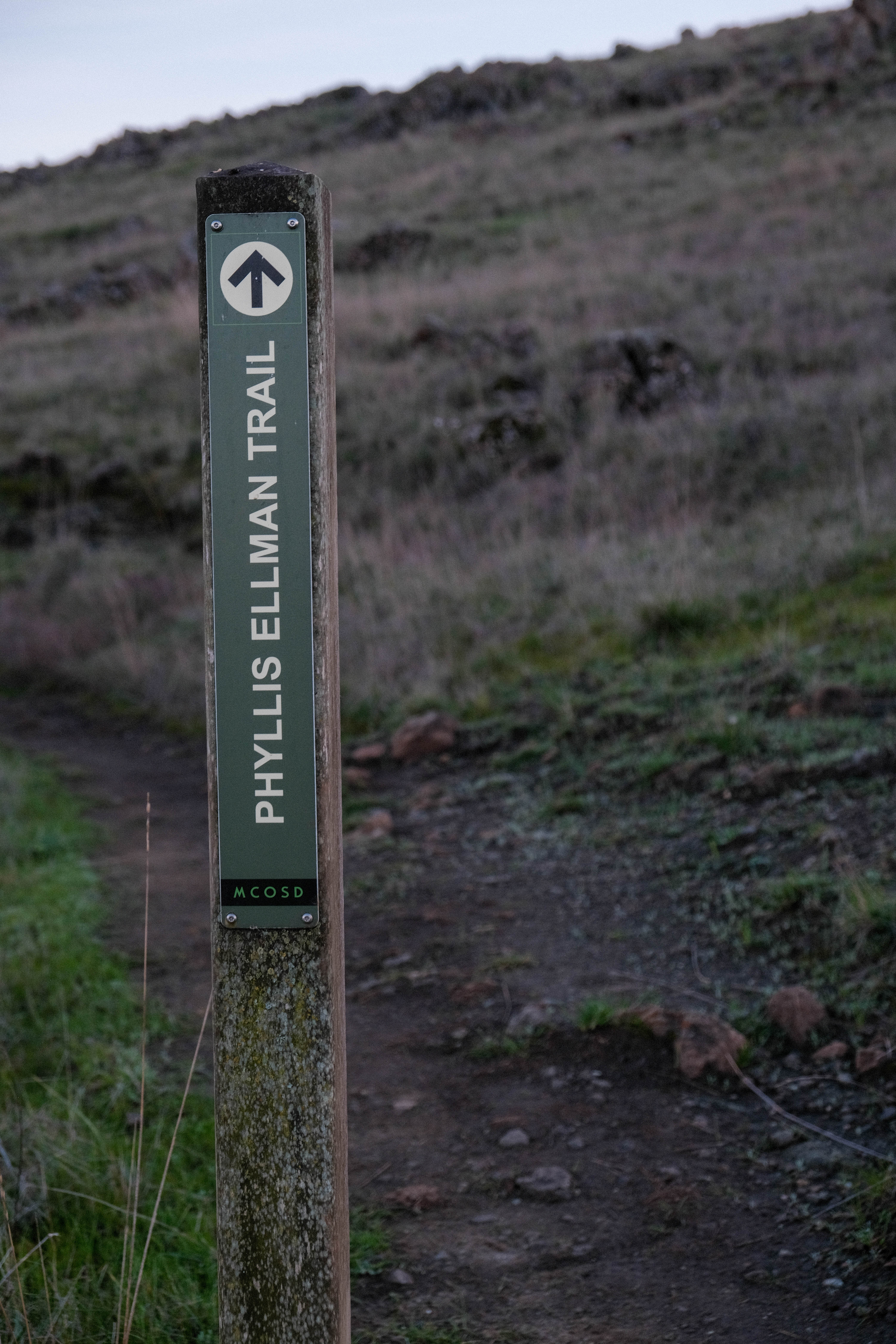
Phyllis Ellman Trailhead on Ring Mountain

In 1981 and 1984, The Nature Conservancy purchased over 300 acres of Ring Mountain in three transactions. Initially, this area was managed as a nature preserve, but in 1995, Ring Mountain was transferred to Marin County while retaining a conservation easement to ensure the land would be used for scientific and educational purposes.

Ring Mountain continues to be an area with high-effort conservation. Since 2011, The Nature Conservancy has been funding this conservation from a bequest by J. Lowell Groves, supporting the Ring Mountain Stewardship and Habitat Restoration Program. The program aims to preserve the area's unique ecosystem and natural beauty long-term.

=== Phyllis Ellman ===
Phyllis Ellman, a biochemist, and member of the Marin chapter of the Native Plant Society, played a key role in the campaign to preserve Ring Mountain from development during the 1970s. Known as “Mother Botany” for her expertise in local wildflowers, Ellman's efforts were instrumental in creating the preserve. Today, a roughly two-mile-long trail was named in her honor.

== Ecology ==
=== Fauna ===
Though Ring Mountain is an island ecosystem surrounded by Highway 101 and suburbs, it is home to a diverse range of wildlife, including coyotes, mule deer, over 45 species of birds, and hundreds of insect species.

=== Flora ===
Ring Mountain is the home of the only population of Tiburon mariposa lily in the world. This flower grows near the summit of the mountain in the grassy areas. Ring Mountain is also home to other rare plants such as the Tiburon jewelflower and the Tiburon paintbrush. The Nature Conservancy bought the land around the mountain and has been responsible for preserving the rare native plant species of the area. In addition to these rare plant species, an estimated 330 other plant species inhabit the mountain.

== Geology ==
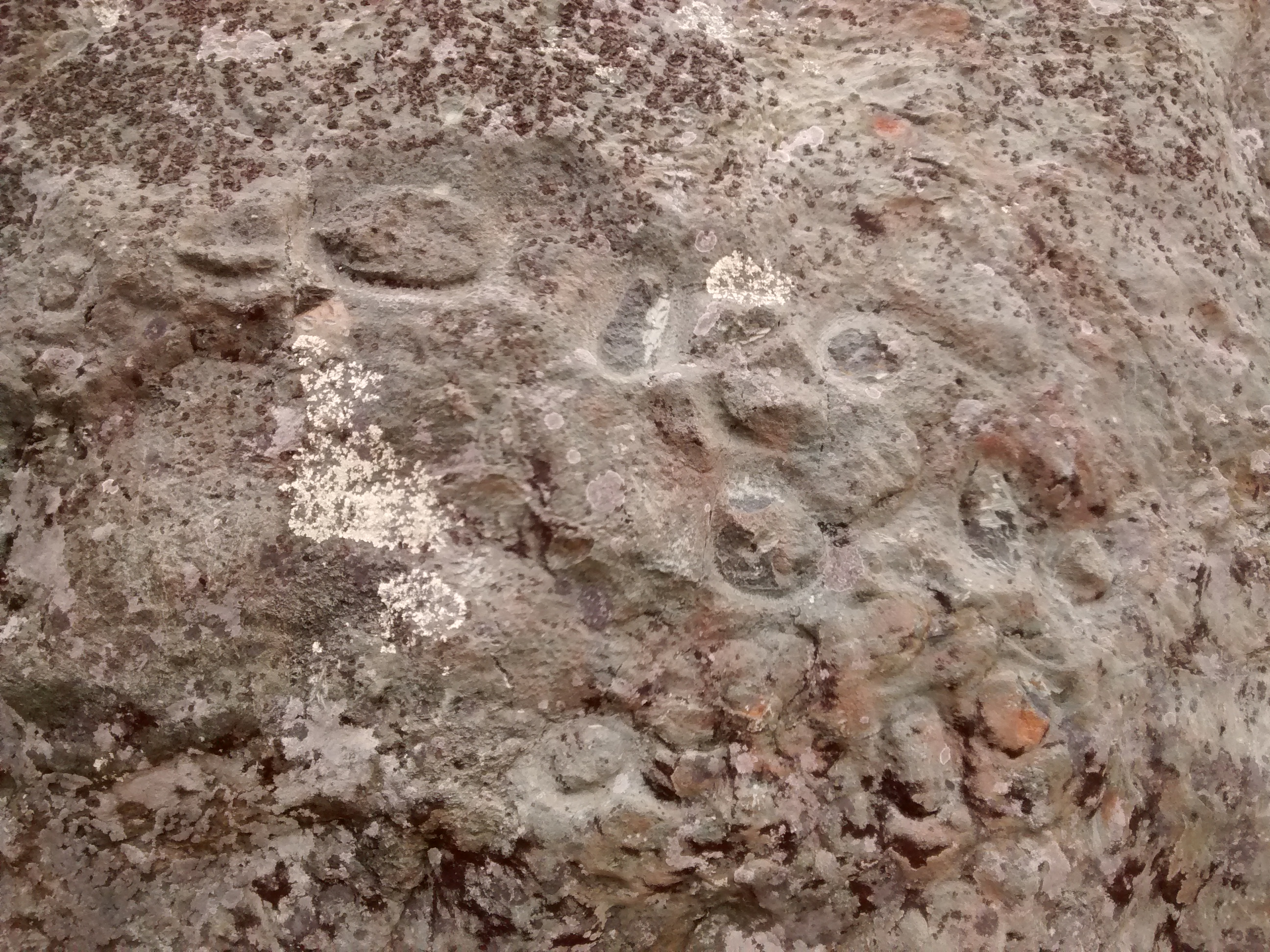
Pecked curvilinear nucleated petroglyphs on a rock on Ring Mountain

Ring Mountain is a unique geological site, where rocks that formed in ancient subduction zones can be observed. Serpentinized peridotite crops out on the two summits of the mountain, and the steep upper slopes are underlain by serpentinite-matrix mélange. The melange contains blocks of high-pressure, low-temperature metamorphic rocks associated with subduction zone metamorphism. Melanges of this general style are known from the Franciscan Complex, but this melange is particularly notable for the size and variety of the metamorphic blocks. Dating of metamorphic minerals in the blocks indicates that they were produced over a protracted history of subduction which began ~175 million years ago. The blocks preserve mineral assemblages characteristic of greenschist facies, blueschist facies, amphibolite facies, and eclogite facies metamorphism and is the type location of the mineral Lawsonite. The lower slopes are underlain by greywacke sandstones and shales of prehnite-pumpellyite metamorphic grade, but the contact between the sandstones and the serpentinite-matrix melange is not exposed. Landslides and their deposits are abundant on Ring Mountain, for example at Triangle Marsh, and they carry serpentinite and metamorphic blocks far downslope from their in situ positions.

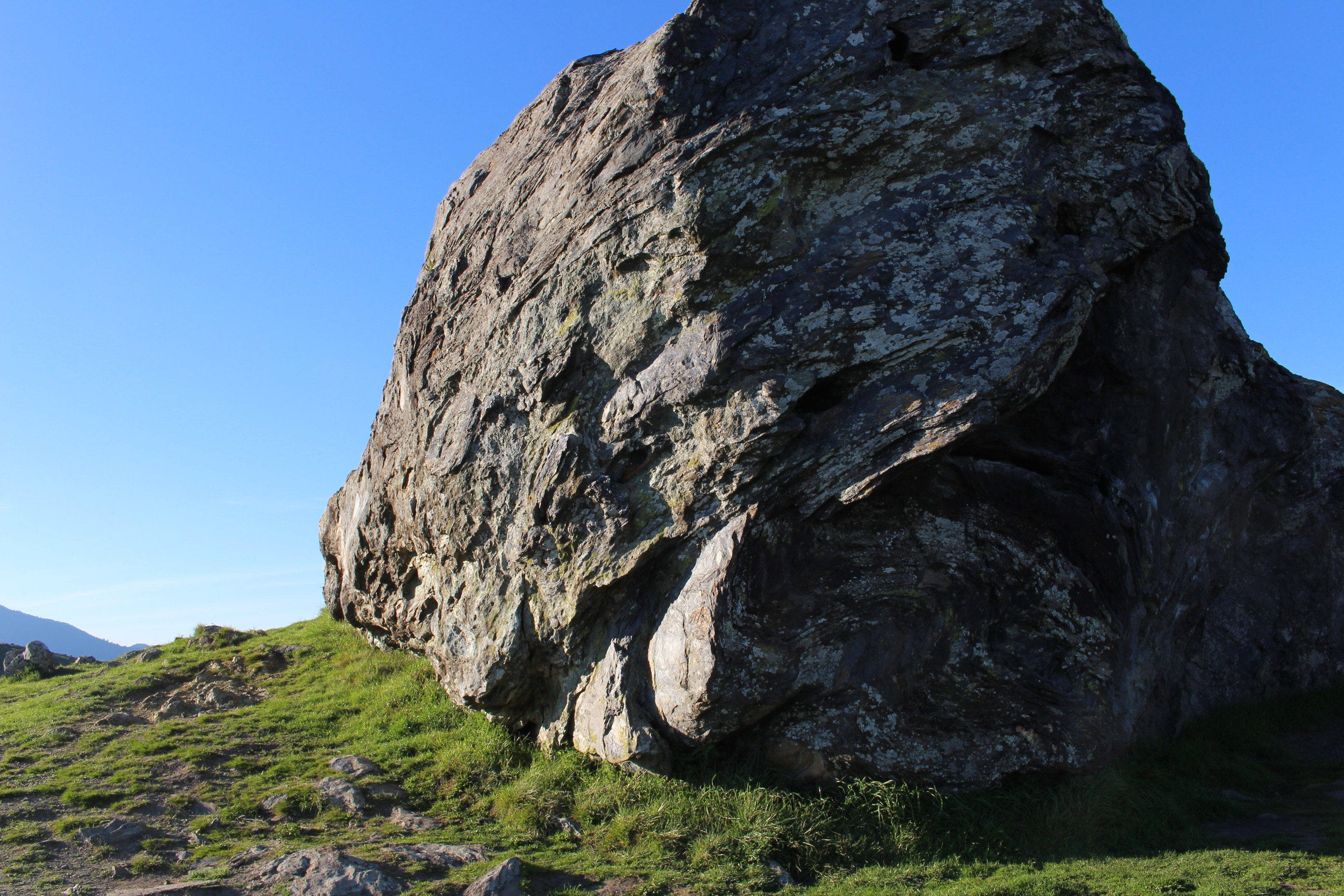
Blueschist block embedded in serpentinite matrix melange on the west side of Ring Mountain.

The origins of the serpentinite-matrix melange, and the mechanism of mixing the metamorphic blocks of different ages and apparent thermal-burial histories, has been a matter of debate. Some authors argue that the metamorphic rocks were exposed at the surface, eroded and re-deposited into a subduction trench to form the melange as an olistostrome. Others interpret the melange as having formed in a subduction plate boundary where blocks of meta-basalt from the downgoing plate were mixed with serpentine from the upper plate mantle.

Ring Mountain is one of the featured field trips found in the Streetcar 2 Subduction online field trip guide series released in December 2019 by the American Geophysical Union.

== Recreation ==
Ring Mountain is a popular hiking and rock climbing destination and provides spectacular 360 degree views of the northern Bay Area.

== Gallery ==
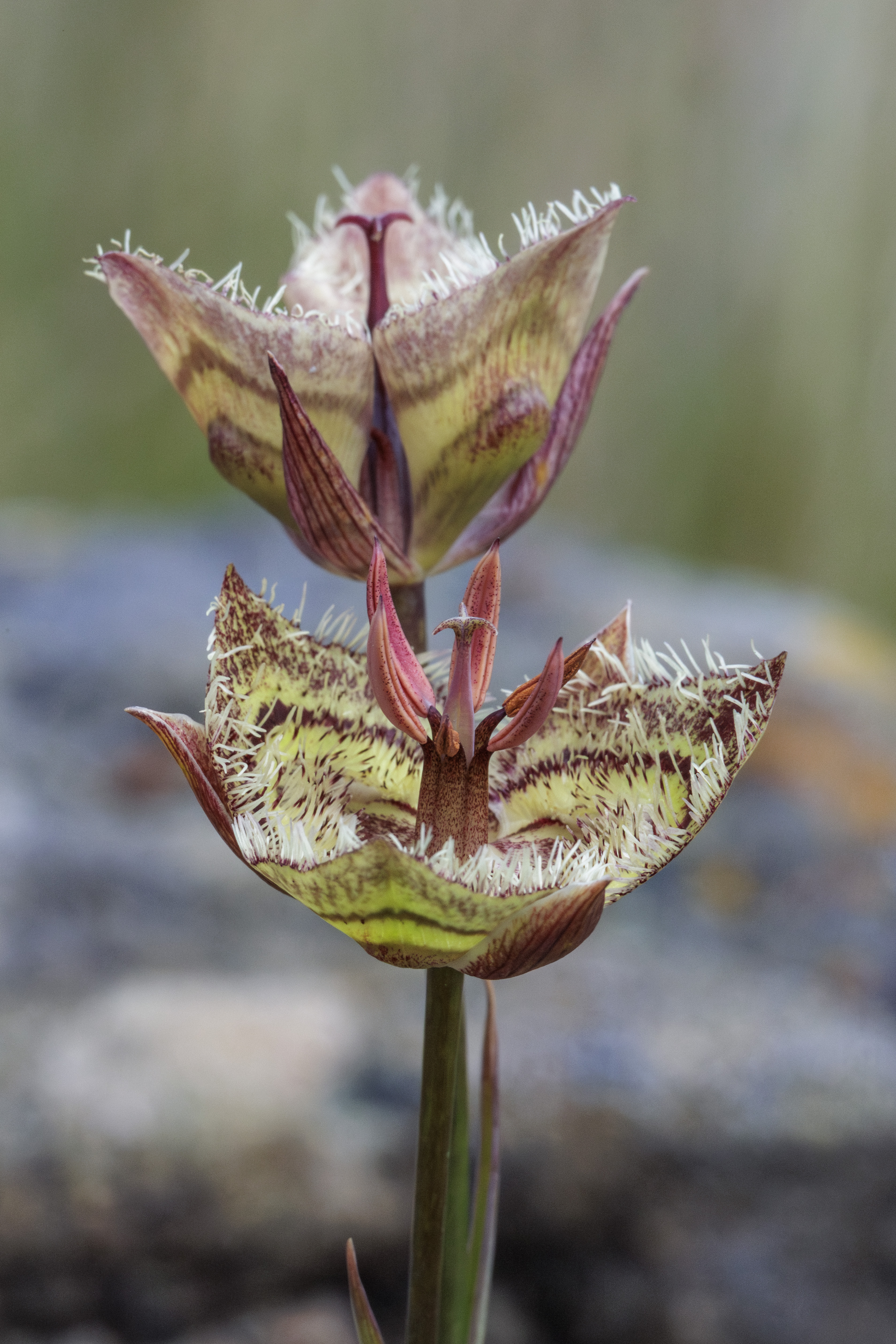
Tiburon mariposa lily, rare flower endemic to Ring Mountain

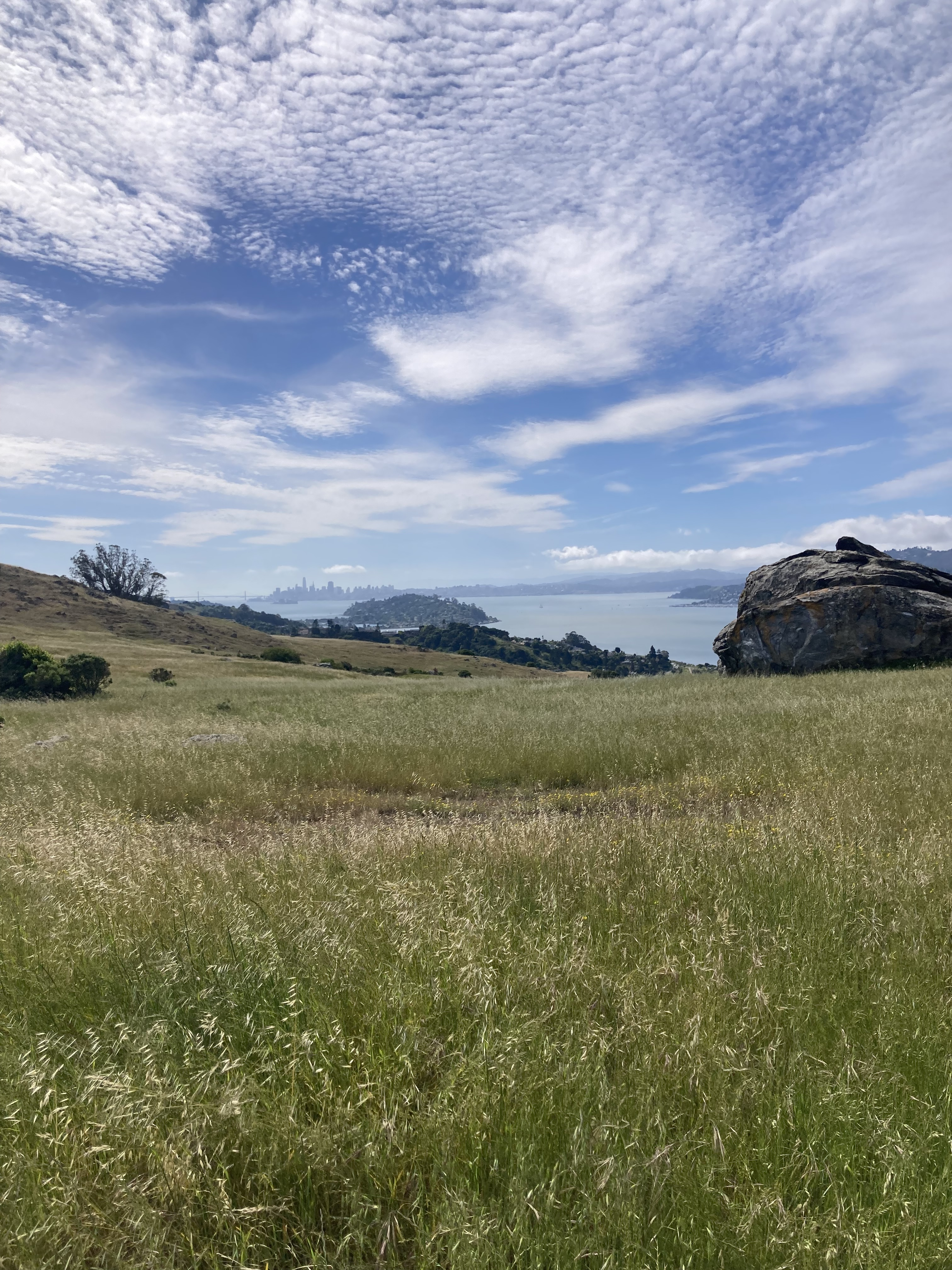
View of San Francisco from Ring Mountain.

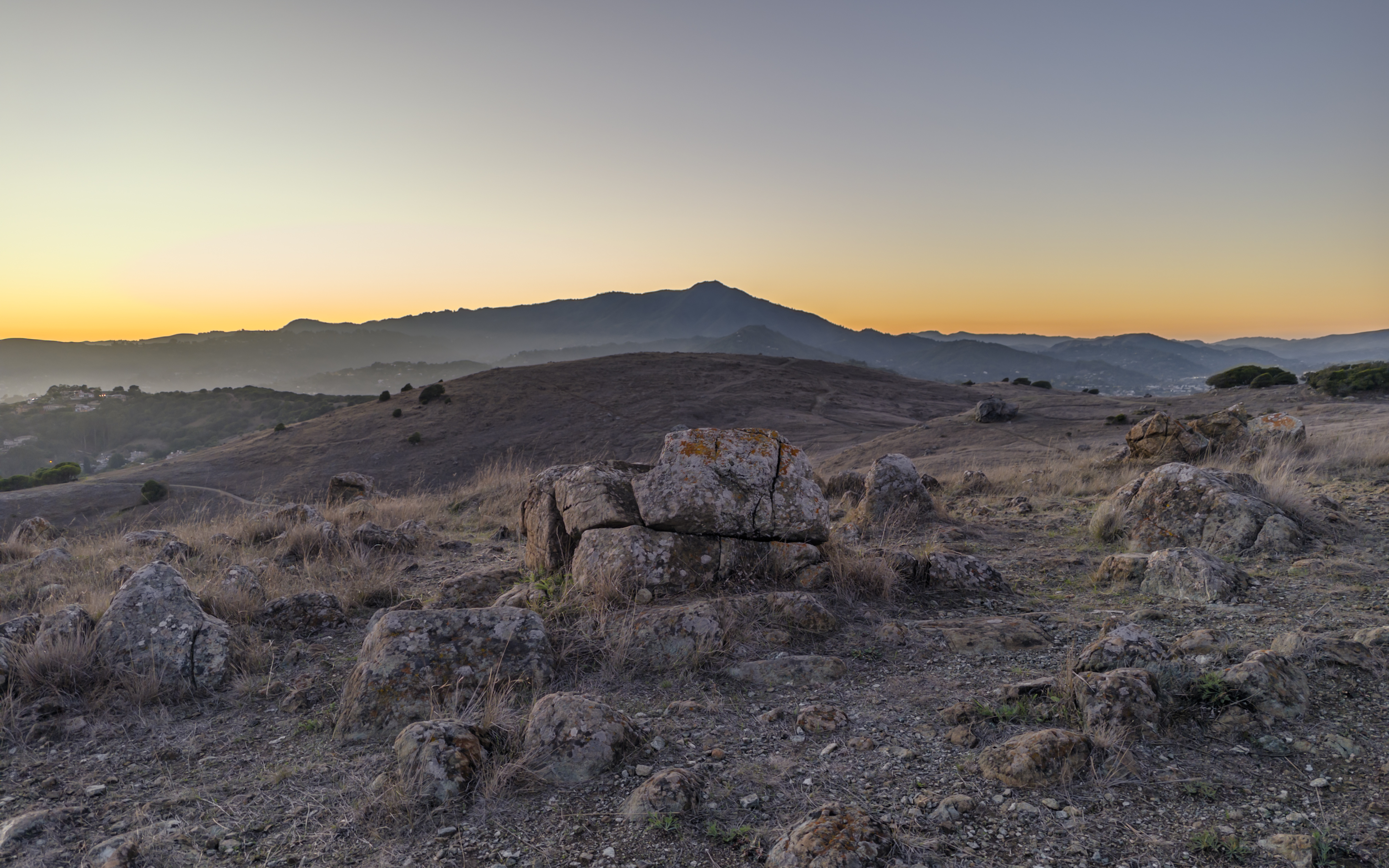
Rocky outcroppings in front of Mt. Tam.

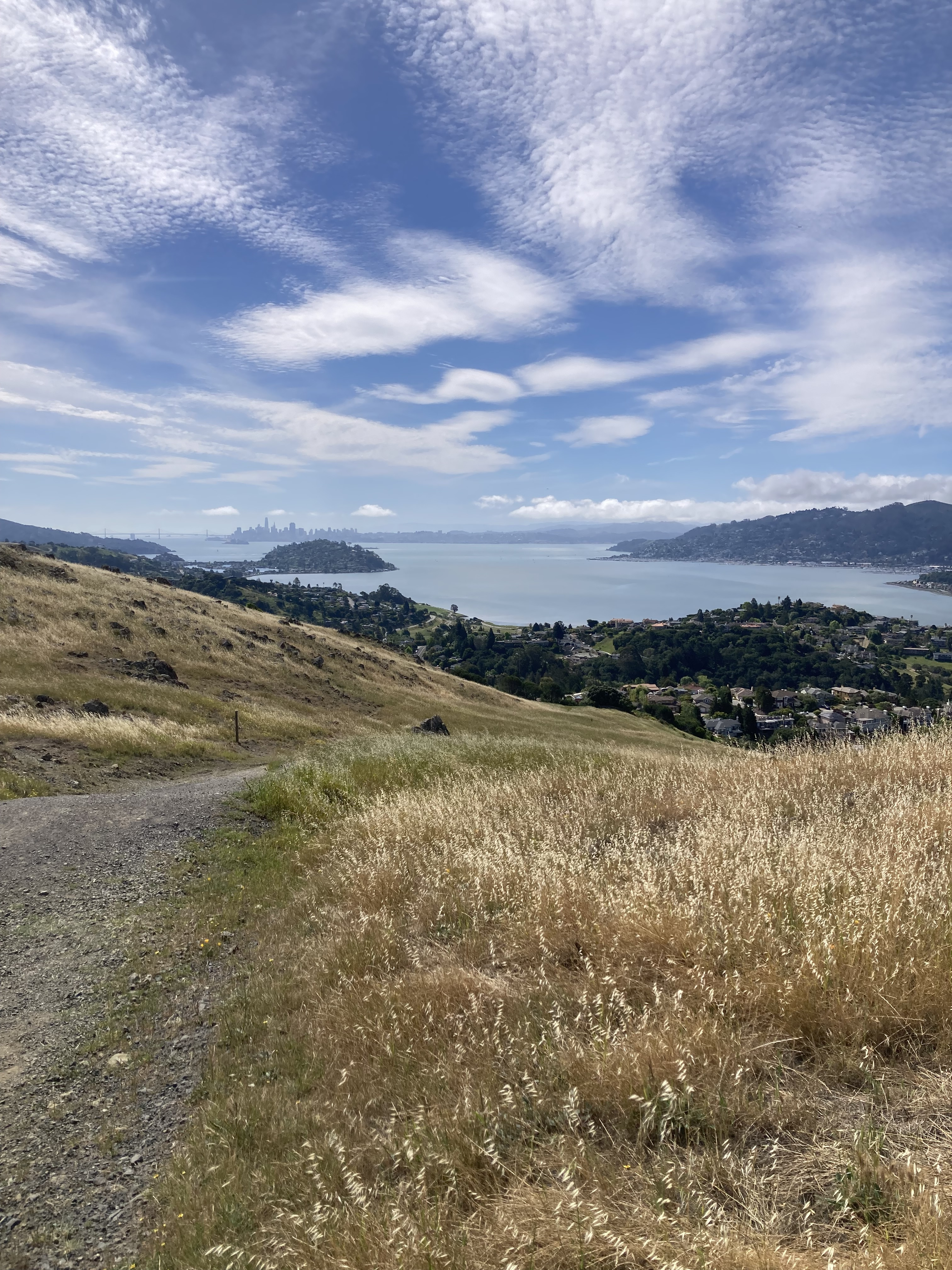
View of San Francisco Bay from the preserve.

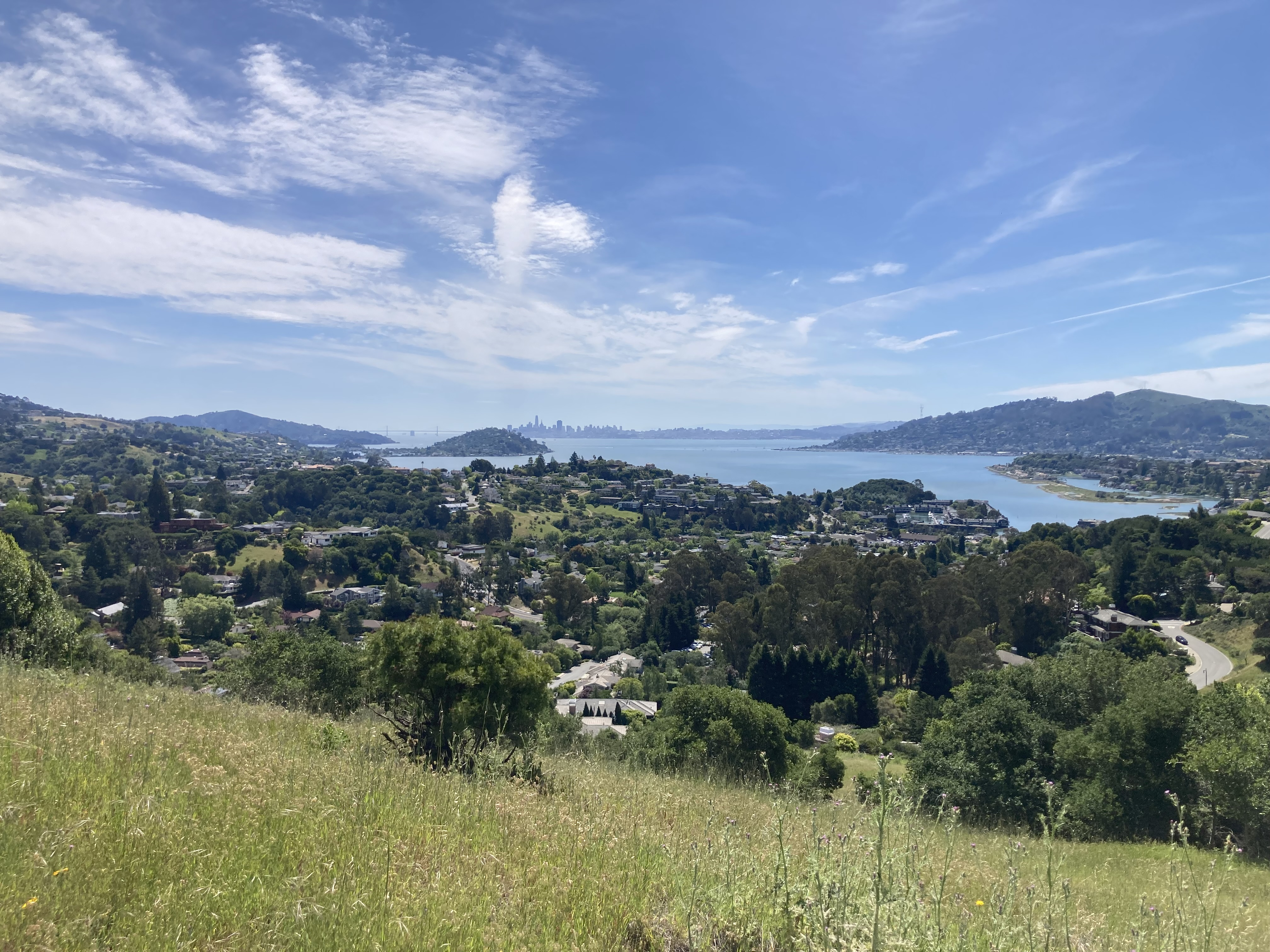
View of Tiburon from the park.

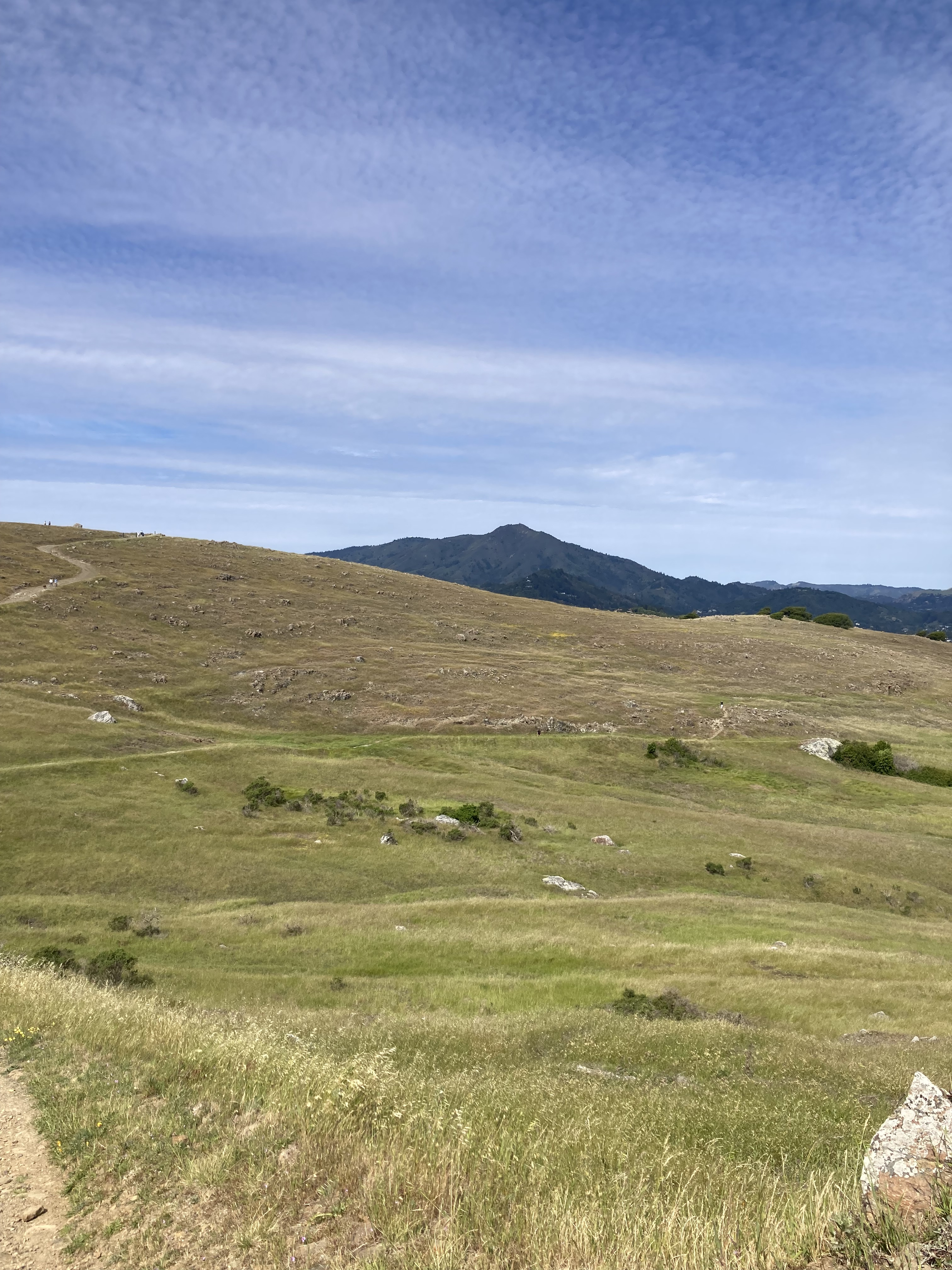
View of Mt. Tam from a path.

== See also ==
- Calochortus tiburonensis
- Castilleja neglecta
- Streptanthus niger
- Triangle Marsh
- Category: Endemic flora of California
