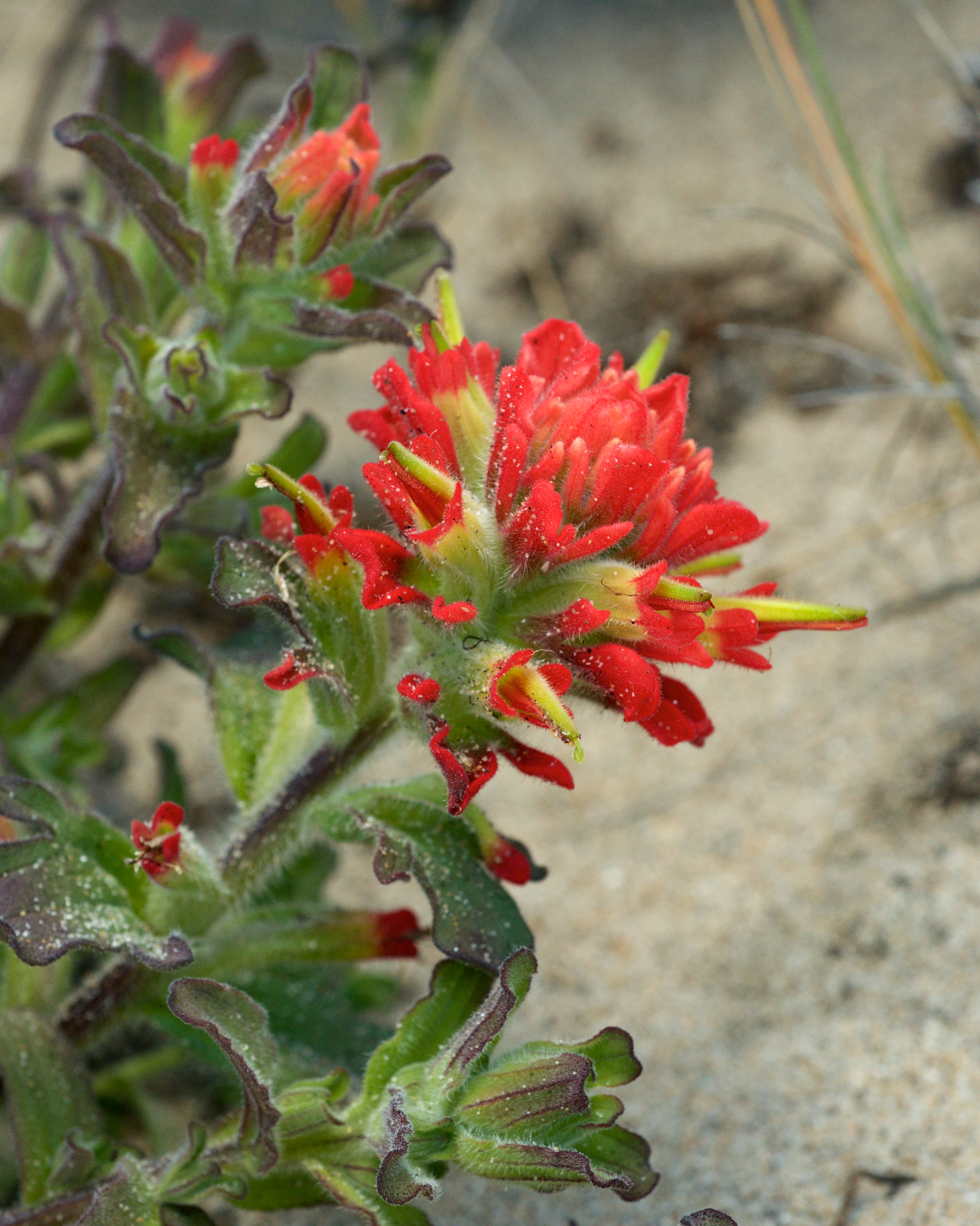

Scientific classification
- Kingdom: Plantae
- Clade: Tracheophytes
- Clade: Angiosperms
- Clade: Eudicots
- Clade: Asterids
- Order: Lamiales
- Family: Orobanchaceae
- Genus: Castilleja
- Species: C. affinis

Binomial name
- Castilleja affinis Hook. & Arn.

= Castilleja affinis =

Coast Indian paintbrush

Species of flowering plant

Castilleja affinis is a species of Castilleja known by the common name coast Indian paintbrush.

It is native to western North America from Washington to Baja California, where it grows on hills and mountains slopes along the coast and inland.

== Description ==
This is a perennial herb growing an erect stem up to about 60 centimeters (24 in.) in maximum height. It is greenish to purple in color and may be hairless to quite hairy. The leaves are variable in shape and up to 8 centimeters long. The inflorescence is a series of bracts in shades of bright red to yellowish. Flowers appearing between the bracts are a bit longer and covered in hairs. They are green to purple lined with red or yellow. The fruit is a capsule just over a centimeter long.

== Subspecies ==
There are three subspecies of this plant, two of which are rare:

Image	Subspecies	Distribution
	C. a. var. affinis	California to Mexico (Baja California Norte)
	C. a. var. contentiosa (J.F.Macbr.) Bacig.	California (southern San Luis Obispo and northern Santa Barbara)
	C. a. var. neglecta (Zeile) J.M.Egger	commonly as the Tiburon paintbrush, is known from only a few occurrences in and around the San Francisco Bay Area. It is a federally listed endangered species.
