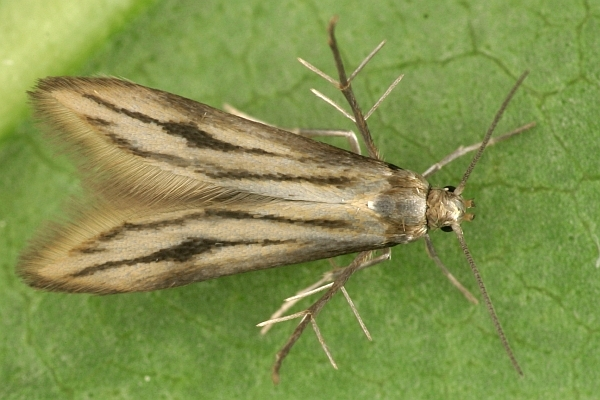
- Schreckensteinia festaliella

Scientific classification
- Domain: Eukaryota
- Kingdom: Animalia
- Phylum: Arthropoda
- Class: Insecta
- Order: Lepidoptera
- Infraorder: Heteroneura
- Clade: Eulepidoptera
- Clade: Ditrysia
- Clade: Apoditrysia
- Superfamily: Schreckensteinioidea; T. B. Fletcher, 1929
- Family: Schreckensteiniidae; T. B. Fletcher, 1929

Genera
- Schreckensteinia Hübner, [1825]; Corsocasis; Euhomalocera Diakonoff, [1968]; Ptilosticha Meyrick, 1910

Diversity
- Twelve species

= Schreckensteiniidae =

Family of moths

Schreckensteinioidea is a superfamily in the insect order Lepidoptera containing a single family, Schreckensteiniidae, or "bristle-legged moths", because of the stout spines on the hindlegs. The superfamily and family were both described by Thomas Bainbrigge Fletcher in 1929. The relationships of this family within the group apoditrysia are currently uncertain. One of the species, the blackberry skeletoniser (Schreckensteinia festaliella), is widespread and common across Europe and has been introduced as a biological control to Hawaii, whilst three species of Corsocasis occur in South East Asia (Dugdale et al., 1999).
