= Russ Mahon =

American cyclist and mountain bike innovator

Cycling career
- Sport: Cycling
- Discipline: Cyclo-cross
- Role: Rider

Russ Mahon is an American cyclist and founder of a cycling group of about 10 riders known as The Morrow Dirt Club, named after a model of coaster brakes produced by Bendix Corporation.

Originally based in Cupertino, California, The Morrow Dirt Club were, arguably, the first to put 10 speeds, drum brakes, and tall handlebars on pre-World War II balloon-tired bicycles for use off-road. These bicycles were the precursor to the modern mountain bike. Russ, along with Tom and Carter Cox, competed in a cyclo-cross race in Mill Valley, California in 1974 on these bikes. It was there that Gary Fisher, Charlie Kelly, and Joe Breeze, among others, were inspired by these bikes and developed them into the worldwide phenomenon known as mountain biking. Mahon's bike was considerably more advanced than the largely stock single-speed bikes used by the Larkspur riders. Shortly afterward, most of the Morrow Dirt Club Members moved away and Mahon left the nascent mountain biking scene, not getting reconnected with the other pioneers until a friend brought him into contact with Tom Ritchey in the 1990s. In 2007, Russ Mahon was profiled in the documentary film, Klunkerz: A Film About Mountain Bikes.
