= Mountain biking =

Bicycle sport

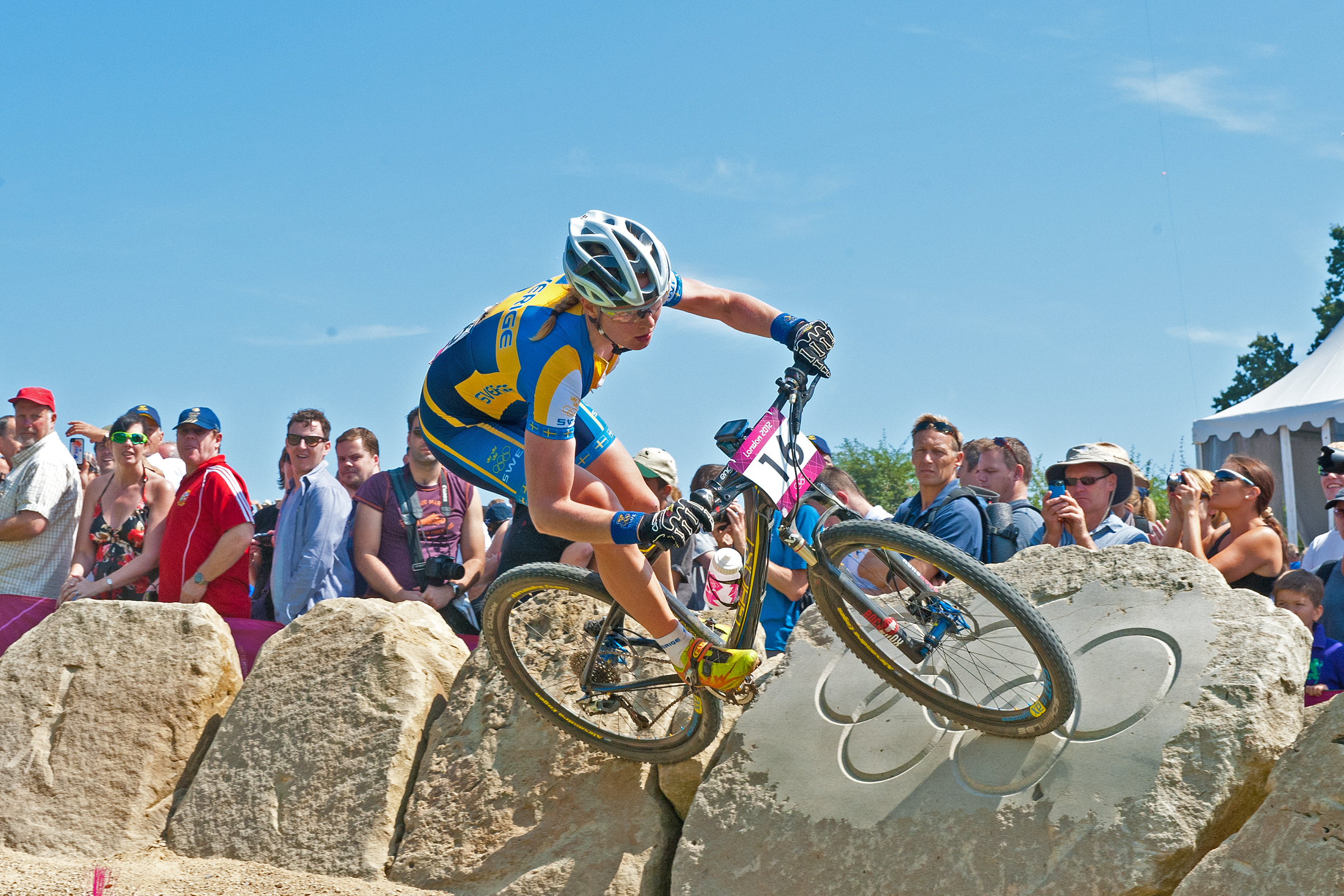
- Mountain biker riding at the 2012 Summer Olympics in London
- Highest governing body: UCI
- First played: Open to debate. The modern era began in the late 1970s

Characteristics
- Mixed-sex: Separate men's & women's championship although no restrictions on women competing against men.

Presence
- Olympic: Since 1996

Pictogram for Cycling at the Summer Olympics

Mountain biking (abbr. MTB) is a sport of riding bicycles off-road, often over rough terrain, usually using specially designed mountain bikes. Mountain bikes share similarities with other bikes but incorporate features designed to enhance durability and performance in rough terrain, such as air or coil-sprung shocks used as suspension, larger and wider wheels and tires, stronger frame materials, and mechanically or hydraulically actuated disc brakes. Mountain biking can generally be broken down into distinct categories: cross country, trail, all mountain, enduro, downhill and freeride.

== About ==
The sport requires endurance, leg, core and back strength, balance, bike handling skills, and self-reliance. Advanced riders pursue both steep technical descents and high-incline climbs. In the case of freeride, downhill, and dirt jumping, aerial maneuvers are performed off both natural features and specially constructed jumps and ramps.

Mountain bikers ride on off-road trails such as singletrack, back-country roads, wider bike park trails, fire roads, and some advanced trails are designed with jumps, berms, and drop-offs to add excitement to the trail. Riders with enduro and downhill bikes will often visit ski resorts that stay open in the summer to ride downhill-specific trails, using the ski lifts to return to the top with their bikes. Because riders are often far from civilization, there is a strong element of self-reliance in the sport. Riders learn to repair broken bikes and flat tires to avoid being stranded. Many riders carry a backpack, including water, food, tools for trailside repairs, and a first aid kit in case of injury. Group rides are common, especially on longer treks. Mountain bike orienteering adds the skill of map navigation to mountain biking.

== History ==
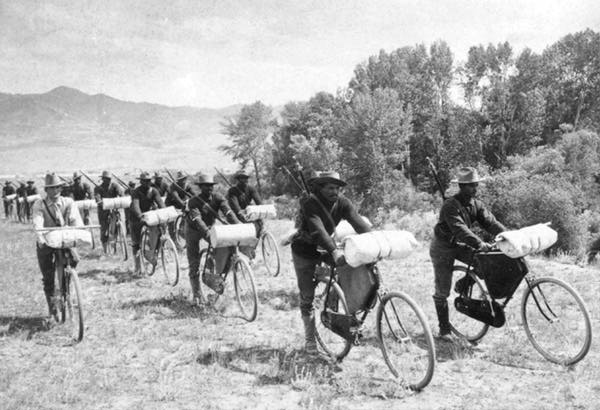
US 25th Infantry Bicycle Corps, 1897

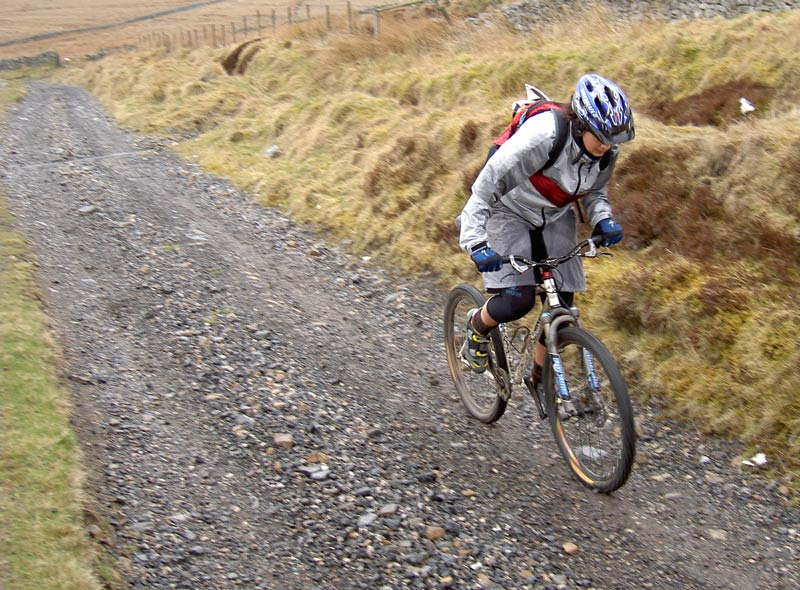
A cross-country mountain biker climbs on an unpaved track

A mountain bike skills track in Wales

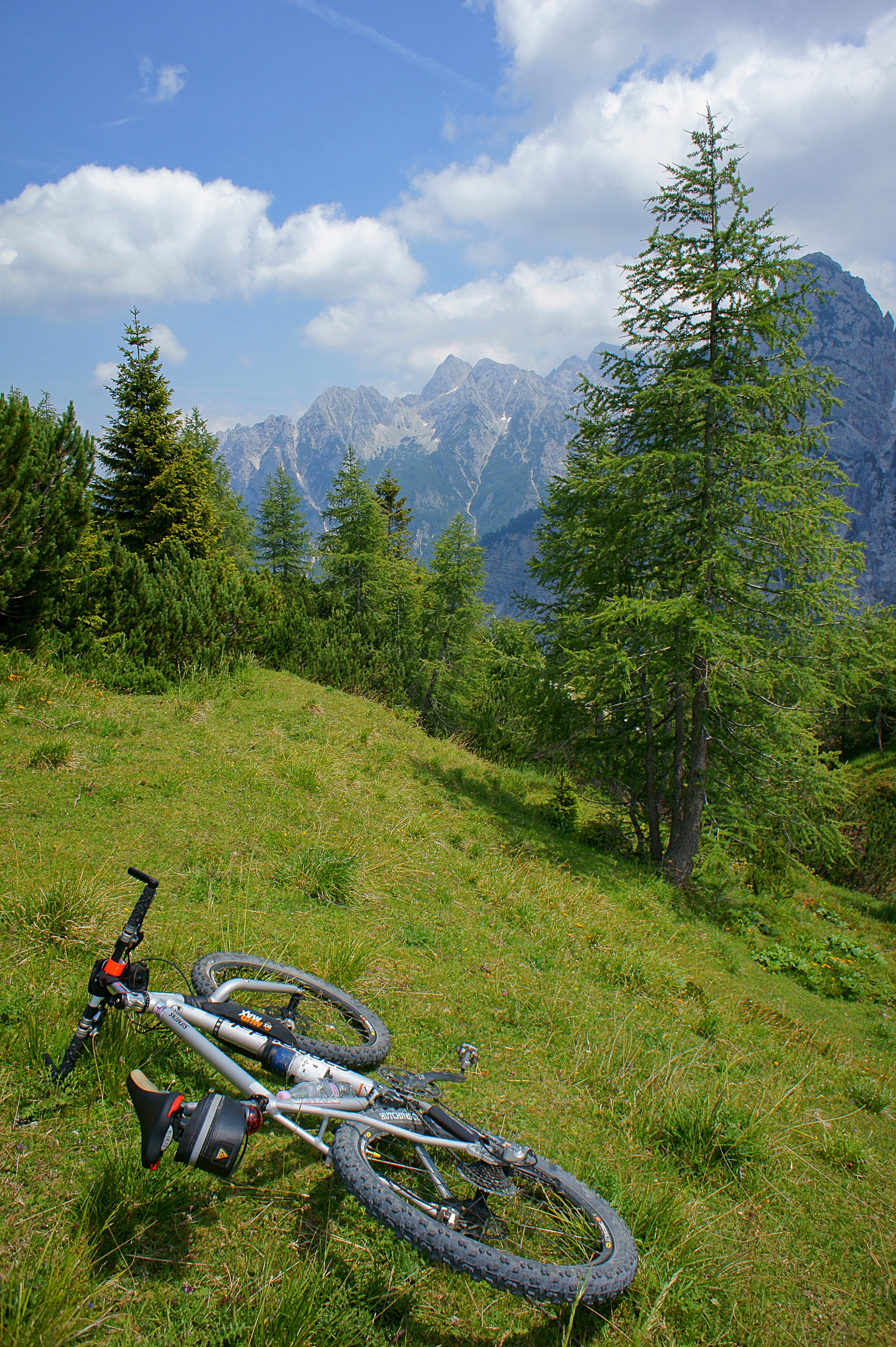
Mountain bike touring in high Alps

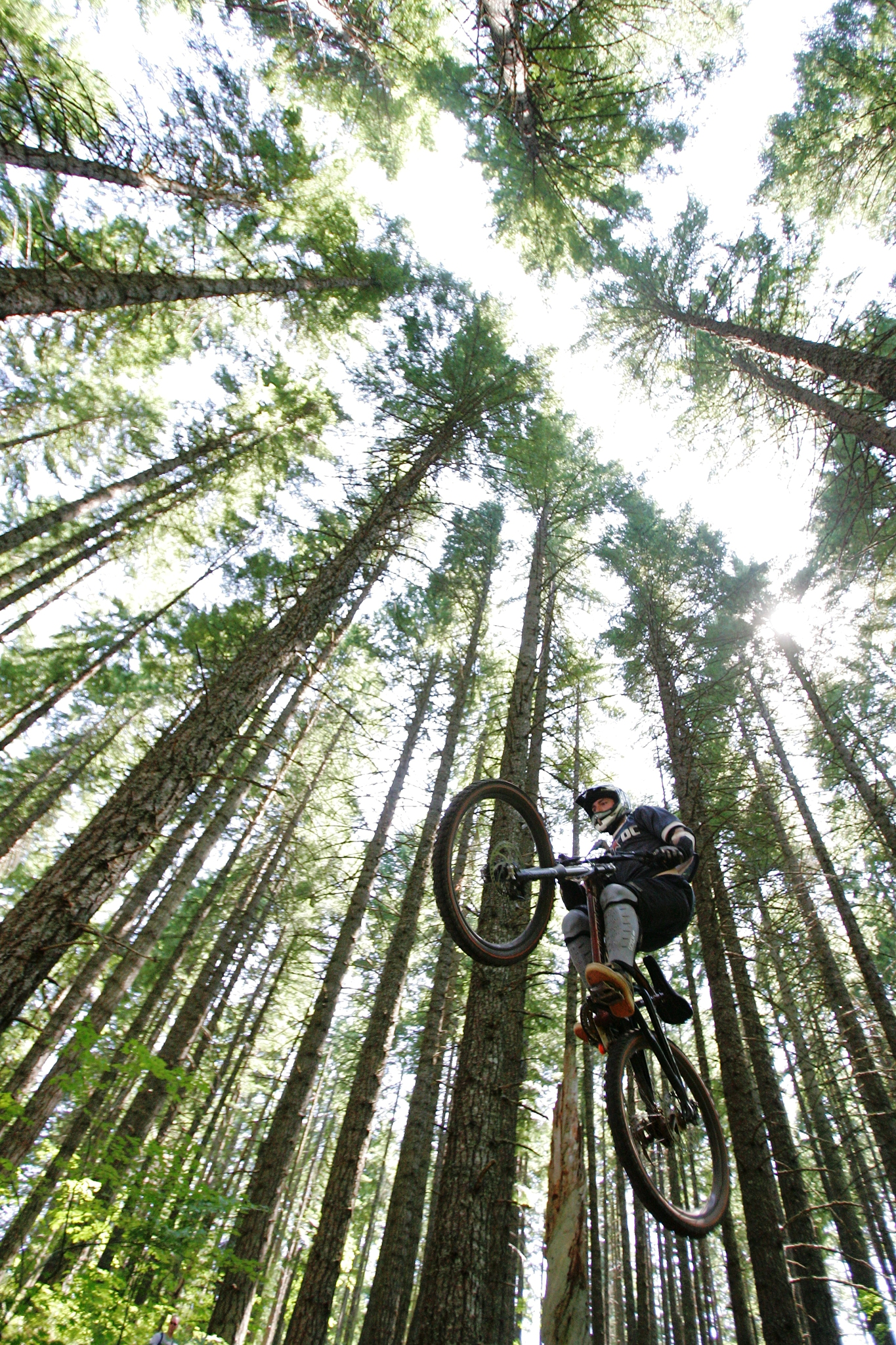
Mountain biker performs a jump in Mount Hood National Forest.

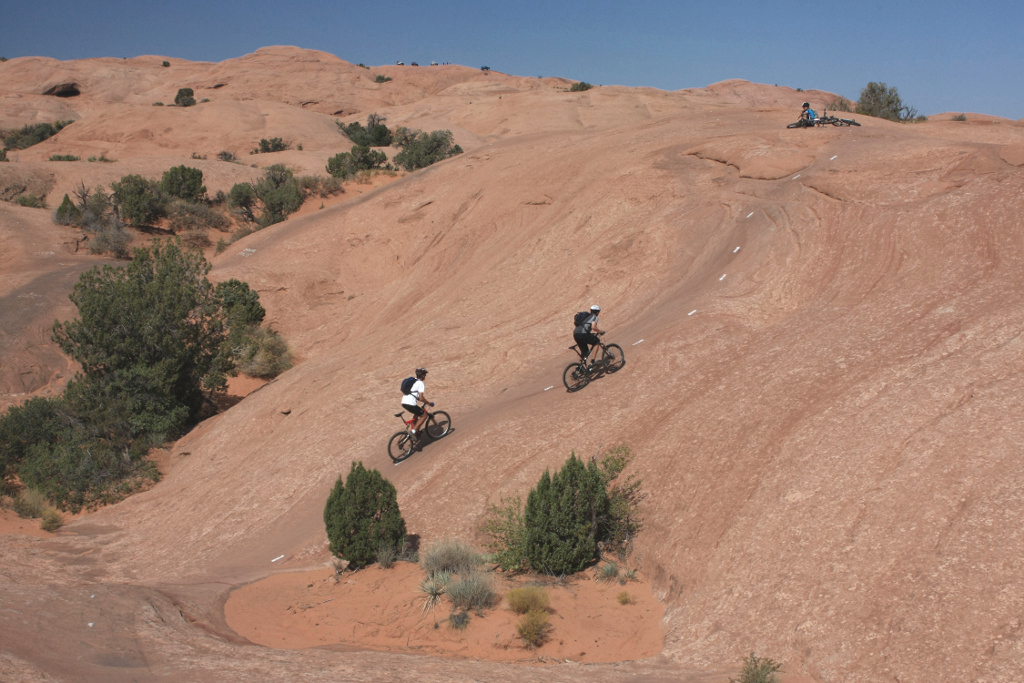
Mountain biking the Slickrock Trail near Moab, Utah; established in 1969 for motorcycling

=== Late 1800s ===
One of the first examples of bicycles modified specifically for off-road use is the expedition of Buffalo Soldiers from Missoula, Montana, to Yellowstone in August 1896.

=== 1900s–1960s ===
Bicycles were ridden off-road by road racing cyclists who used cyclocross as a means of keeping fit during the winter. Cyclo-cross eventually became a sport in its own right in the 1940s, with the first world championship taking place in 1950.

The Rough Stuff Fellowship was established in 1955 by off-road cyclists in the United Kingdom.

In Oregon in 1966, one Chemeketan club member, D. Gwynn, built a rough terrain trail bicycle. He named it a "mountain bicycle" for its intended place of use. This may be the first use of that name.

In England in 1968, Geoff Apps, a motorbike trials rider, began experimenting with off-road bicycle designs. By 1979 he had developed a custom-built lightweight bicycle which was uniquely suited to the wet and muddy off-road conditions found in the south-east of England. They were designed around 2 inch × 650b Nokian snow tires though a 700x47c (28 in.) version was also produced. These were sold under the Cleland Cycles brand until late 1984. Bikes based on the Cleland design were also sold by English Cycles and Highpath Engineering until the early 1990s.

=== 1970s–1980s ===
There were several groups of riders in different areas of the US who could make valid claims to playing a part in the birth of the sport. Riders around Mt. Tamalpais in Marin County, California and Crested Butte, Colorado tinkered with bikes and adapted them to the rigors of off-road riding. Modified heavy cruiser bicycles, old 1930s and '40s Schwinn bicycles retrofitted with better brakes and fat tires, were used for freewheeling down mountain trails in Marin in the late 1960s to the late 1970s. At the time, the bikes were comparatively primitive with single-speed coaster brakes. The earliest ancestors of modern mountain bikes were based around frames made by Schwinn, Colson and others. The Schwinn Excelsior was the frame of choice due to its geometry. These early bikes were eventually modified with multi-speed gearing, drum or rim brakes, and motocross or BMX-style handlebars, creating "klunkers". The term would also be used as a verb since the term "mountain biking" was not yet in use. The first person known to fit multiple speeds and drum brakes to a klunker is Russ Mahon of Cupertino, California, who used the resulting bike in cyclo-cross racing. Early downhill racing on mountain fire roads caused lesser-branded coaster brakes to burn the grease inside, requiring the riders to "repack" the bearings after each race. The first organized series of downhill races in Fairfax, California, known as "Repack Races" triggered early innovations in mountain bike technology as well as the initial exposure of the sport to a nationwide audience through TV media's Evening Magazine. The fire road unofficially named "Repack" still exists and is rideable. The sport originated in California on Marin County's Mount Tamalpais.

It was not until the late 1970s and early 1980s that road bicycle companies started to manufacture mountain bicycles using high-tech lightweight materials. Joe Breeze is normally credited with introducing the first purpose-built mountain bike in 1978. Tom Ritchey then went on to make frames for a company called MountainBikes, a partnership between Gary Fisher, Charlie Kelly and Tom Ritchey. Tom Ritchey, a welder with skills in frame building, also built the original bikes. The company's three partners eventually dissolved their partnership, and the company became Fisher Mountain Bikes, while Tom Ritchey started his own frame shop.

The first mountain bikes were basically road bicycle frames (with heavier tubing and different geometry) with a wider frame and fork to allow for a wider tire. The handlebars were also different in that they were a straight, transverse-mounted handlebar, rather than the dropped, curved handlebars that are typically installed on road racing bicycles. Also, some of the parts on early production mountain bicycles were taken from the BMX bicycle. Other contributors were Otis Guy and Keith Bontrager.

Tom Ritchey built the first regularly available mountain bike frame, which was accessorized by Gary Fisher and Charlie Kelly and sold by their company called MountainBikes (later changed to Fisher Mountain Bikes, then bought by Trek, still under the name Gary Fisher, currently sold as Trek's "Gary Fisher Collection"). The first two mass-produced mountain bikes were sold in the early 1980s: the Specialized Stumpjumper and Univega Alpina Pro. In 1988, The Great Mountain Biking Video was released, soon followed by others. In 2007, Klunkerz: A Film About Mountain Bikes was released, documenting mountain bike history during the formative period in Northern California. Additionally, a group of mountain bikers called the Laguna Rads formed a club during the mid eighties and began a weekly ride, exploring the uncharted coastal hillsides of Laguna Beach, California. Industry insiders suggest that this was the birth of the freeride movement, as they were cycling up and down hills and mountains where no cycling specific trail network prexisted. The Laguna Rads have also held the longest-running downhill race once a year since 1986.

At the time, the bicycle industry was not impressed with the mountain bike, regarding mountain biking as a short-term fad. In particular, large manufacturers such as Schwinn and Fuji failed to see the significance of an all-terrain bicycle and the coming boom in 'adventure sports'. Instead, the first mass-produced mountain bikes were pioneered by new companies such as MountainBikes (later, Fisher Mountain Bikes), Ritchey, and Specialized. Specialized was an American startup company that arranged for the production of mountain bike frames from factories in Japan and Taiwan. First marketed in 1981, Specialized's mountain bike largely followed Tom Ritchey's frame geometry, but used TIG welding to join the frame tubes instead of fillet-brazing, a process better suited to mass production, and which helped to reduce labor and manufacturing cost. The bikes were configured with 15 gears using derailleurs, a triple chainring, and a cogset with five sprockets.

=== 1990s–2000s ===
Throughout the 1990s and first decade of the 21st century, mountain biking moved from a little-known sport to a mainstream activity. Mountain bikes and mountain bike gear, once only available at specialty shops or via mail order, became available at standard bike stores. By the mid-first decade of the 21st century, even some department stores began selling inexpensive mountain bikes with full suspension and disc brakes. In the first decade of the 21st century, trends in mountain bikes included the "all-mountain bike", the 29er and the one-by drivetrain (though the first mass-produced 1x drivetrain was Sram's XX1 in 2012). "All-mountain bikes" were designed to descend and handle well in rough conditions, while still pedaling efficiently for climbing, and were intended to bridge the gap between cross-country bikes and those built specifically for downhill riding. They are characterized by 4–6 inches (100–150 millimetres) of fork travel. 29er bikes are those using 700c sized rims (as do most road bikes), but wider and suited for tires of two inches (50 mm) width or more; the increased diameter wheel can roll over obstacles better and offers a greater tire contact patch, but also results in a longer wheelbase, making the bike less agile, and in less travel space for the suspension. The single-speed is considered a return to simplicity with no drivetrain components or shifters but it thus requires a stronger rider.

=== 2000s–2020s ===
Following the growing trend in 29-inch (740 mm) wheels, there have been other trends in the mountain biking community involving tire size. Some riders prefer to have a larger wheel in the front than on the rear, such as on a motorcycle, to increase maneuverability. This is called a mullet bicycle, most common with a 29-inch wheel in the front and a 27.5-inch (700 mm) wheel in the back. Another interesting trend in mountain bikes is outfitting dirt jump or urban bikes with rigid forks. These bikes normally use suspension forks with 4 to 5 inches (100 to 130 mm) of travel. The resulting product is used for the same purposes as the original bike. A commonly cited reason for making the change to a rigid fork is the enhancement of the rider's ability to transmit force to the ground, which is important for performing tricks. In the mid-first decade of the 21st century, an increasing number of mountain bike-oriented resorts opened. Often, they are similar to or in the same complex as a ski resort or they retrofit the concrete steps and platforms of an abandoned factory as an obstacle course, as with Ray's MTB Indoor Park. Mountain bike parks which are operated as summer season activities at ski hills usually include chairlifts that are adapted to bikes, a number of trails of varying difficulty, and bicycle rental facilities.

In 2020, due to COVID-19, mountain bikes saw a surge in popularity in the US, with some vendors reporting that they were sold out of bikes under US$1000.

== Equipment ==
=== Bike ===
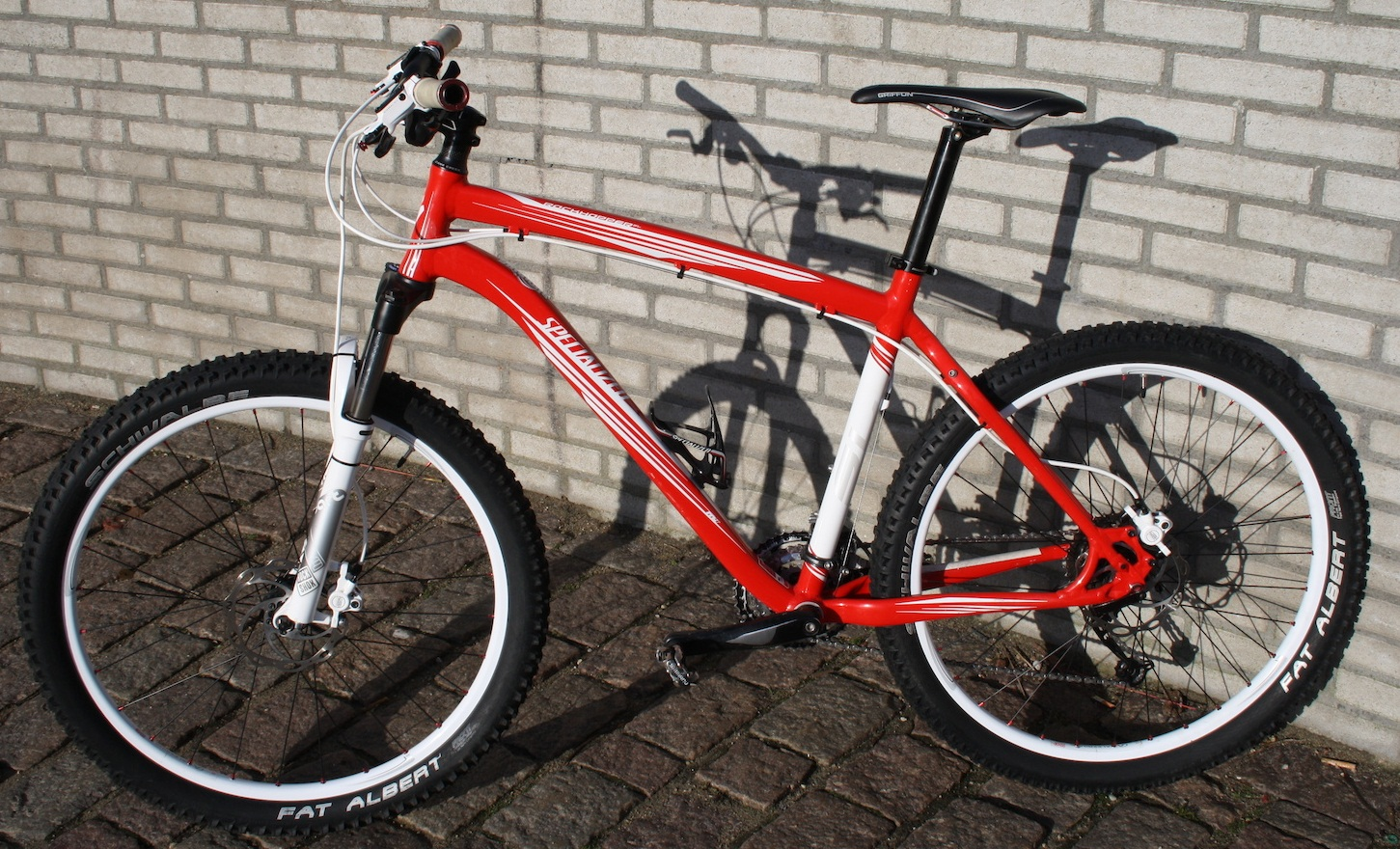
A hardtail mountain bike

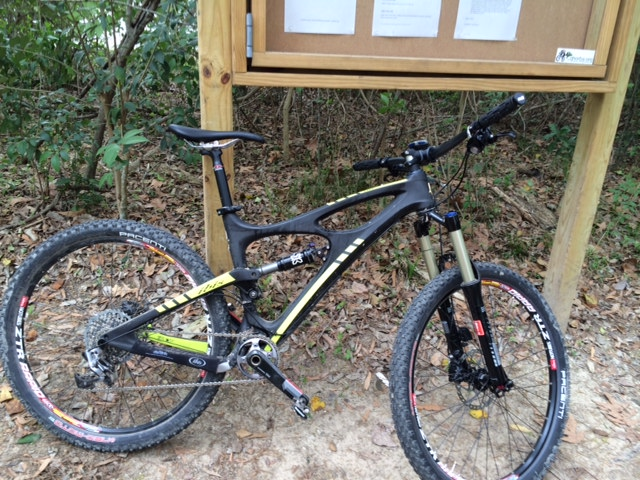
A dual suspension or full suspension mountain bike, 'all-mountain' mountain bike

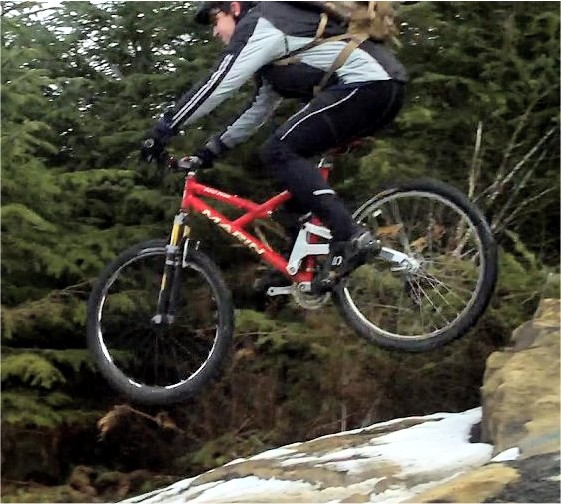
Typical more stout all-mountain bike on rough terrain

- Mountain bikes differ from other bikes primarily in that they incorporate features aimed at increasing durability and improving performance in rough terrain. Most modern mountain bikes have some kind of suspension, 26, 27.5 or 29-inch diameter tires, usually between 1.7 and 2.8 inches in width, and a wider, flat or upwardly-rising handlebar that allows a more upright riding position, giving the rider more control. They have a smaller, reinforced frame, usually made of wide tubing. Tires usually have a pronounced tread, and are mounted on rims which are stronger than those used on most non-mountain bicycles. Compared to other bikes, mountain bikes also use hydraulic disc brakes. They also tend to have a lower ratio gears to facilitate climbing steep hills and traversing obstacles. Pedals vary from simple platform pedals, where the rider simply places the shoes on top of the pedals, to clipless, where the rider uses a specially equipped shoe with a cleat that engages mechanically into the pedal.

=== Accessories ===
- Glasses with little or no difference from those used in other cycling sports, help protect against debris while on the trail. Filtered lenses, whether yellow for cloudy days or shaded for sunny days, protect the eyes from strain. Downhill, freeride, and enduro mountain bikers often use goggles similar to motocross or snowboard goggles in unison with their full-face helmets.
- Shoes generally have gripping soles similar to those of hiking boots for scrambling over unridable obstacles, unlike the smooth-bottomed shoes used in road cycling. The shank of mountain bike shoes is generally more flexible than that of road cycling shoes. Shoes compatible with clipless pedal systems are also frequently used.
- Clothing is chosen for comfort during physical exertion in the backcountry, and its ability to withstand falls. Road touring clothes are often inappropriate due to their delicate fabrics and construction. Depending on the type of mountain biking, different types of clothes and styles are commonly worn. Cross-country mountain bikers tend to wear Lycra shorts and tight road-style jerseys due to the need for comfort and efficiency. Downhill riders tend to wear heavier fabric baggy shorts or motocross-style trousers to protect themselves from falls. All mountain/enduro riders tend to wear light fabric baggy shorts and jerseys as they can be in the saddle for long periods of time.
- Hydration systems are important for mountain bikers in the backcountry, ranging from simple water bottles to water bags with drinking tubes in lightweight backpacks known as a hydration pack. (e.g.CamelBaks).
- GPS systems are sometimes added to the handlebars and are used to monitor progress on trails.
- Pump to inflate tires.
- CO_{2} Inflator with cartridge to inflate a tube or tubeless tire.
- Bike tools and extra bike tubes are important, as mountain bikers frequently find themselves miles from help, with flat tires or other mechanical problems that must be handled by the rider.
- High-power lights based on LED technology, used for mountain biking at night.
- Some sort of protective case

=== Protective gear ===
Mountain bikers in the Port Hills, New Zealand, wearing a variety of protective gear

The level of protection worn by individual riders varies greatly and is affected by speed, trail conditions, the weather, and numerous other factors, including personal choice. Protection becomes more important where these factors may be considered to increase the possibility or severity of a crash.

A helmet and gloves are usually regarded as sufficient for the majority of non-technical riding. Full-face helmets, goggles and armored suits or jackets are frequently used in downhill mountain biking, where the extra bulk and weight may help mitigate the risks of bigger and more frequent crashes.

- Helmet. The use of helmets, in one form or another, is almost universal amongst mountain bikers. The three main types are: cross-country, rounded skateboarder style (nicknamed "half shells" or "skate style"), and full-face. Cross-country helmets tend to be light and well ventilated, and more comfortable to wear for long periods, especially while perspiring in hot weather. In XC competitions, most bikers tend to use the usual road-racing style helmets for their lightweight and aerodynamic qualities. Skateboard helmets are simpler and usually more affordable than other helmet types; they provide great coverage of the head and resist minor scrapes and knocks. Unlike road-biking helmets, skateboard helmets typically have a thicker, hard plastic shell which can take multiple impacts before it needs to be replaced. The trade-off for this is that they tend to be much heavier and less ventilated (sweatier), therefore not suitable for endurance-based riding. Full-face helmets (BMX-style) provide the highest level of protection and tend to be stronger than skateboarding style and include a jaw guard to protect the face. The weight is the main issue with this type, but today they are often reasonably well-ventilated and made of lightweight materials such as carbon fiber. (Full-face helmets with detachable chin-guards are available in some locations, but there are compromises to keep in mind with these designs.) As all helmets should meet minimum standards, SNELL B.95 (American Standard) BS EN 1078:1997 (European Standard), DOT, or "motorized ratings" are making their way into the market. The choice of helmet often comes down to rider preference, the likelihood of crashing, and on what features or properties of a helmet they place emphasis. Helmets are mandatory at competitive events and almost without exception at bike parks; most organizations also stipulate when and where full-face helmets must be used.
- Body armor and pads, often referred to simply as "armor", are meant to protect limbs and body in the event of a crash. While initially made for and marketed for downhill riders, free-riders, and jump/street riders, body armor has trickled into other areas of mountain biking as trails have become steeper and more technically complex (hence bringing a commensurately higher injury risk). Armor ranges from simple neoprene sleeves for knees and elbows to complex, articulated combinations of hard plastic shells and padding that cover a whole limb or the entire body. Some companies market body armor jackets and even full-body suits designed to provide greater protection through greater coverage of the body and more secure pad retention. Most upper-body protectors also include a spine protector that comprises plastic or metal reinforced plastic plates, over foam padding, which are joined so that they articulate and move with the back. Some mountain bikers also use BMX-style body armor, such as chest plates, abdomen protectors, and spine plates. New technology has seen an influx of integrated neck protectors that fit securely with full-face helmets, such as the Leatt-Brace. There is a general correlation between increased protection and increased weight/decreased mobility, although different styles balance these factors differently. Different levels of protection are deemed necessary/desirable by different riders in different circumstances. Backpack hydration systems such as Camelbaks, where a water-filled bladder is held close to the spine, are used by some riders for their perceived protective value. More recently, with the increase in enduro racing, backpack hydration systems are also being sold with built-in spine protection. However, there is only anecdotal evidence of protection.
- Gloves can offer increased comfort while riding, by alleviating compression and friction, and can protect against superficial hand injuries. They provide protection in the event of strikes to the back or palm or when putting the hand out in a fall and can protect the hand, fingers, and knuckles from abrasion on rough surfaces. Many different styles of gloves exist, with various fits, sizes, finger lengths, palm padding, and armor options available. Armoring knuckles and the backs of hands with plastic panels is common in more extreme types of mountain biking. Most of it depends on preference and necessity.
- First aid kits are often carried by mountain bikers so that they can clean, dress cuts, abrasions, and splint broken limbs. Head, brain, and spinal injuries become more likely as speeds increase. All of these can bring permanent changes in the quality of life. Experienced mountain bike guides may be trained in dealing with suspected spinal injuries (e.g., immobilizing the victim and keeping the neck straight). Seriously injured people may need to be removed by stretcher, by a motor vehicle suitable for the terrain, or by helicopter.

Protective gear cannot provide immunity against injuries. For example, concussions can still occur despite the use of helmets, and spinal injuries can still occur with the use of spinal padding and neck braces. The use of high-tech protective gear can result in a revenge effect, whereupon some cyclists feel safe taking dangerous risks.

Because the key determinant of injury risk is kinetic energy, and because kinetic energy increases with the square of the speed, effectively each doubling of speed can quadruple the injury risk. Similarly, each tripling of speed can be expected to bring a nine-fold increase in risk, and each quadrupling of speed means that a sixteen-fold risk increase must be anticipated.

Higher speeds of travel also add danger due to reaction time. Because higher speeds mean that the rider travels further during their reaction time, this leaves less travel distance within which to react safely. This, in turn, further multiplies the risk of an injurious crash.

In general, although protective gear cannot always prevent the occurrence of injuries, the use of such equipment is appropriate, as is maintaining it in serviceable condition. Because mountain biking takes place outdoors, ultraviolet radiation from sunlight is present, and UV rays are known to degrade plastic components. Accordingly, and as a rule of thumb, a bicycle helmet should be replaced every five years, or sooner if it appears damaged. Additionally, if the helmet has been involved in an accident or has otherwise incurred impact-type damage, then it should be replaced promptly, even if it does not appear to be visibly damaged.

== Categories ==
=== Cross-country cycling ===
Cross-Country (XC) generally means riding point-to-point or in a loop including climbs and descents on a variety of terrain. A typical XC bike weighs around 9–13 kilos (20–30 lbs), and has 0–125 millimeters (0.0–4.9 inches) of suspension travel front and sometimes rear. Cross-country mountain biking focuses on physical strength and endurance more than the other forms, which require greater technical skill. Cross-country mountain biking is the only mountain biking discipline in the Summer Olympic Games.

=== Trail ===
Trail bikes typically have front suspension travel of 120-130mm; they do not commonly have rear suspension. They are mostly used for recreation not formal competitions.

=== All-mountain ===
All-mountain bikes typically have front suspension travel of 140-150mm. They are less focused on speed and stability when riding down hills than enduro bikes, thereby increasing efficiency when riding up hills.

=== Enduro ===
Enduro bikes tend to have moderate-travel suspension systems and components that are stronger than XC models, typically 160–180 mm of travel on a full suspension frame, but at a weight that is suitable for both climbing and descending.

Enduro racing includes elements of DH racing, but Enduro races are much longer, sometimes taking a full day to complete, and incorporate climbing sections to connect the timed downhill descents (often referred to as stages). Typically, there is a maximum time limit for how long a rider takes to reach the top of each climb, while finishers of the downhill portions are ranked by fastest times.

Historically, many long-distance XC races would use the descriptor "enduro" in their race names to indicate their endurance aspect. Some long-standing race events have maintained this custom, sometimes leading to confusion with the modern Enduro format, which has been adopted by the Enduro World Series.

Enduro racing was commonly seen as a race for all abilities. While there are many recreational riders who do compete in Enduro races, the sport is increasingly attracting high-level riders such as Sam Hill or Isabeau Courdurier.

=== Downhill ===
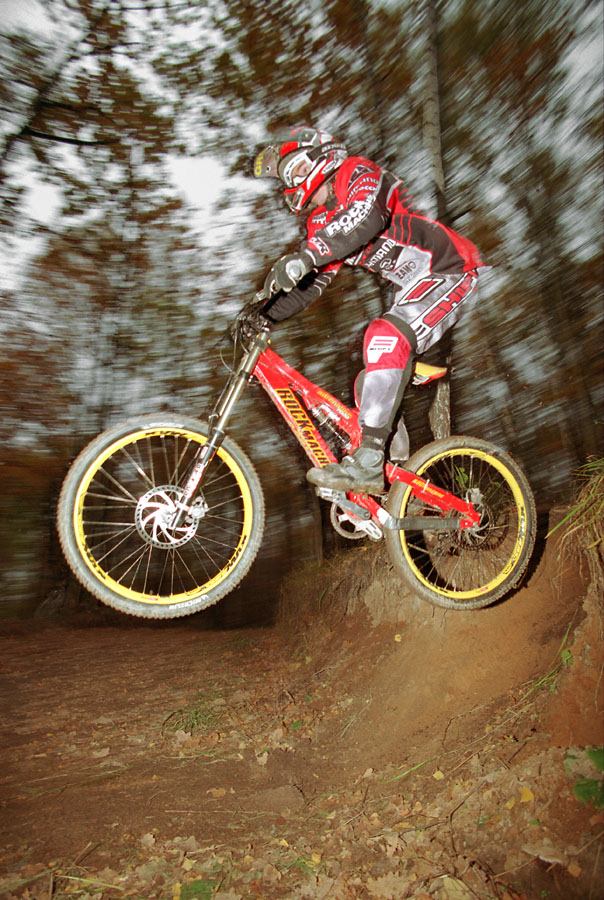
Downhill mountain biking

Downhill (DH) is, in the most general sense, riding mountain bikes downhill. Downhill tracks normally include large jumps, drops or other features, and are generally rough and steep from top to bottom. Often, facilities such as an automobile up-lift or ski lift will be available to transport riders and their bikes to the start-point, as the weight of downhill mountain bikes precludes any serious climbing.

Because of the extremely steep terrain, downhill mountain biking is one of the most extreme and dangerous cycling disciplines. Minimum body protection for downhill riding includes gloves, knee pads and a full-face helmet, although many riders and racers commonly wear more extensive, full-body protection that includes padding at selected locations.

Downhill-specific bikes are universally equipped with front and rear suspension, large disc brakes, and use heavier frame tubing than other mountain bikes. Downhill bicycles now weigh around 16–20 kg (35–44 lb), while the most expensive professional downhill mountain bikes can weigh as little as 15 kilograms (33 pounds), fully equipped with custom carbon fibre parts, air suspension, tubeless tires and more. Downhill frames have anywhere from 170–250 millimeters (6.7–9.8 inches) of travel and are usually equipped with a 200 millimeters (7.9 inches) travel dual-crown fork.

=== Four-cross/Dual Slalom ===
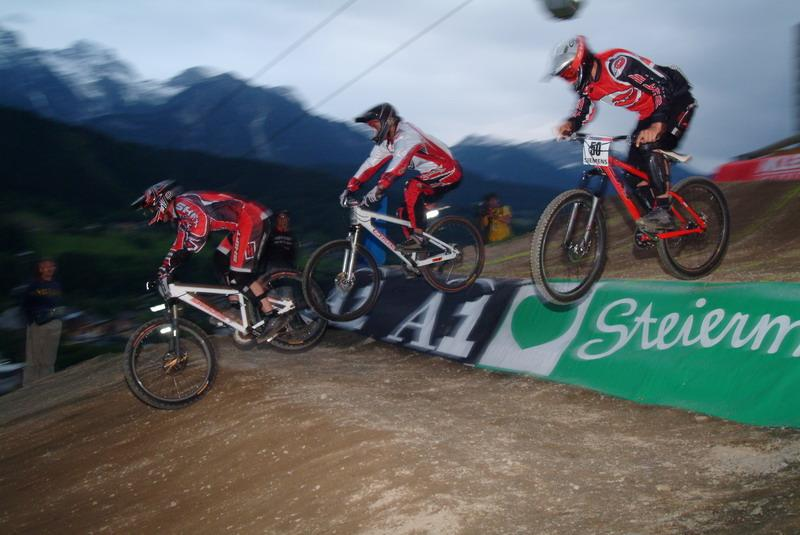
Four-cross race

Four-cross/Dual Slalom (4X) is a discipline in which riders compete either on separate tracks, as in Dual Slalom, or on a short slalom track, as in 4X. Most bikes used are light hard-tails, although the last World Cup was actually won on a full-suspension bike. The track is downhill and has dirt jumps, berms, and gaps.

Professionals in gravity mountain biking tend to concentrate either on downhill mountain biking or 4X/dual slalom because they are very different. However, some riders, such as Cedric Gracia, used to compete in both 4X and DH, although that is becoming rarer as 4X takes on its own identity.

=== Freeride ===
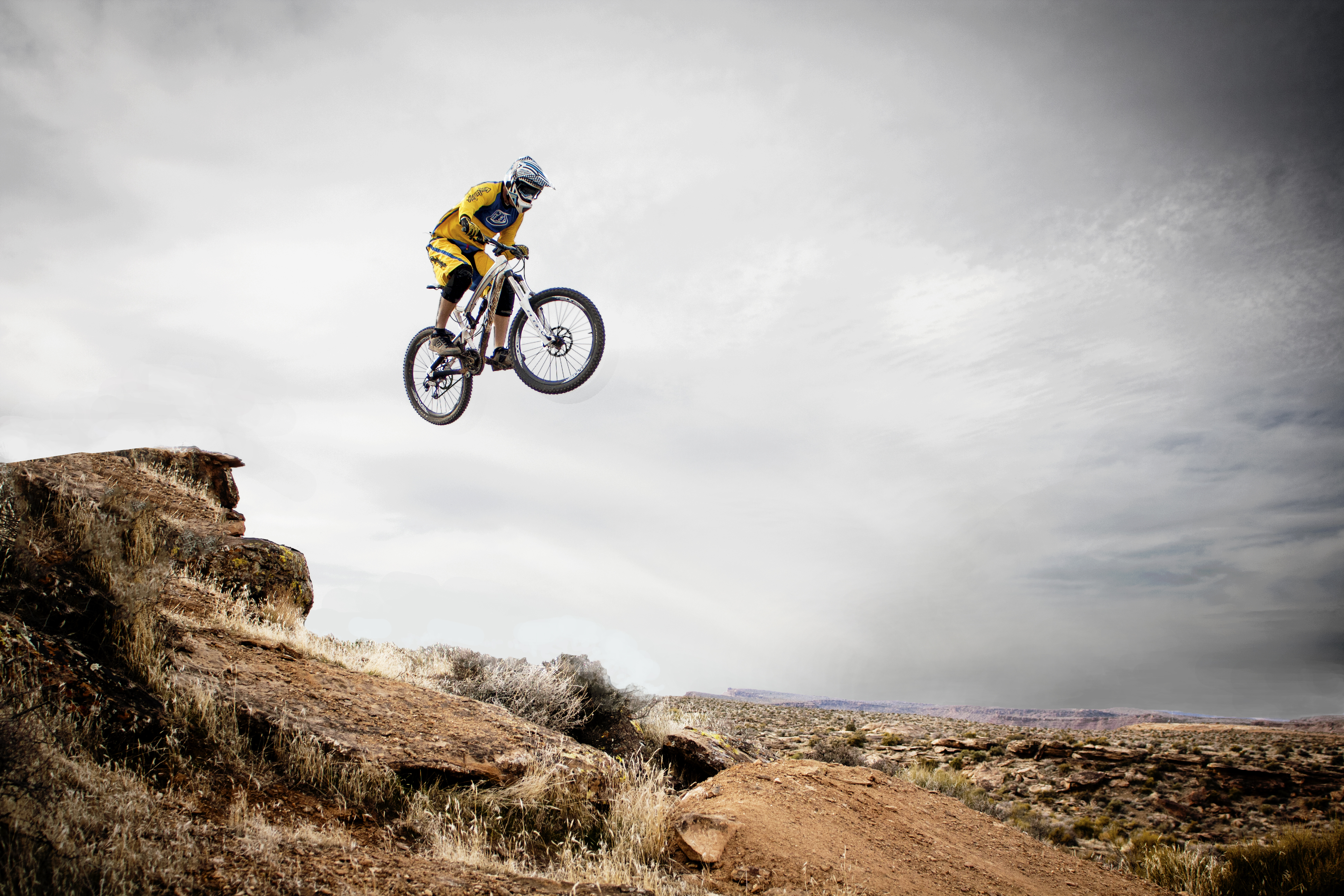
Freeride

Freeride / Big Hit / Hucking, as the name suggests, is a 'do anything' discipline that encompasses everything from downhill racing without the clock to jumping, riding 'North Shore' style (elevated trails made of interconnecting bridges and logs), and generally riding trails and stunts that require more skill and aggressive techniques than XC.

"Slopestyle" type riding is an increasingly popular genre that combines big-air, stunt-ridden freeride with BMX-style tricks. Slopestyle courses are usually constructed at already established mountain bike parks and include jumps, large drops, quarter-pipes, and other wooden obstacles. There are always multiple lines through a course and riders compete for judges' points by choosing lines that highlight their particular skills.

A "typical" freeride bike is hard to define, but typical specifications are 13–18 kilos (30–40 lbs) with 150–250 millimeters (5.9–9.8 inches) of suspension front and rear. Freeride bikes are generally heavier and more amply suspended than their XC counterparts, but usually retain much of their climbing ability. It is up to the rider to build their bike to lean more toward a preferred level of aggressiveness.

=== Dirt Jumping ===
Dirt Jumping (DJ) is the practice of riding bikes over shaped mounds of dirt or soil and becoming airborne. The goal is that after riding over the 'lip' the rider will become airborne and aim to land on the 'knuckle'. Dirt jumping can be done on almost any bicycle, but the bikes chosen are generally smaller and more maneuverable hardtails so that tricks such as backflips, whips, and tabletops are easier to complete. The bikes are simpler so that when a crash occurs there are fewer components to break or cause the rider injury. Bikes are typically built from sturdier materials such as steel to handle repeated heavy impacts of crashes and bailouts.

=== Trials ===
Trials riding consists of hopping and jumping bikes over obstacles, without touching a foot onto the ground. It can be performed either off-road or in an urban environment. This requires an excellent sense of balance. The emphasis is placed on techniques of effectively overcoming the obstacles, although street-trials (as opposed to competition-oriented trials) are much like Street and DJ, where doing tricks with style is the essence. Trials bikes look almost nothing like mountain bikes. They use either 20, 24 or 26 in (510, 610 or 660 mm) wheels and have very small, low frames, some types without a saddle.

=== Urban/Street ===
Urban/Street is essentially the same as urban BMX (or Freestyle BMX), in which riders perform tricks by riding on/over man-made objects. The bikes are the same as those used for Dirt Jumping, having 24-inch or 26-inch wheels. Also, they are very light, many in the range of 25–30 lb (11–14 kg), and are typically hardtails with between 0–100 millimeters of the front suspension. As with Dirt Jumping and Trials, style and execution are emphasized.

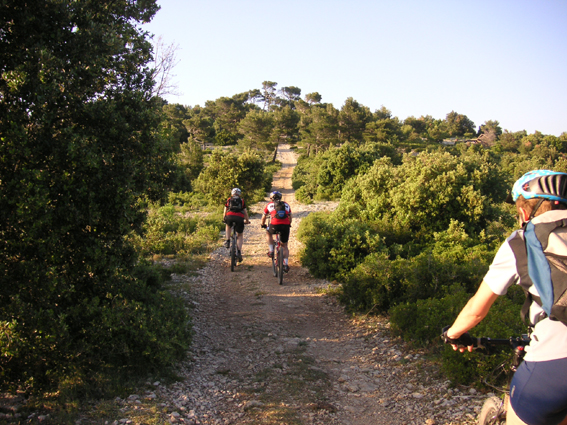
Mountain bike trail riding (trail biking)

=== Trail riding ===
Trail riding or trail biking is a varied and popular non-competitive form of mountain biking on recognized, and often waymarked and graded, trails; unpaved tracks, forest paths, etc. Trails may take the form of single routes or be part of a larger complex, known as trail centers. Trail difficulty typically varies from gentle 'family' trails (green) through routes with increasingly technical features (blue and red) to those requiring high levels of fitness and skill (black) incorporating demanding ascents with steep technical descents comparable to less extreme downhill routes. As difficulty increases trails incorporate more technical trail features such as berms, rock gardens, uneven surfaces, drop-offs and jumps. The most basic of bike designs can be used for less severe trails, but there are "trail bike" designs which balance climbing ability with good downhill performance, almost always having 4.7 to 5.9 inches (120 to 150 mm) of travel on a suspension fork, with either a hard tail or a similar travel rear suspension. Many more technical trails are also used as routes for cross-country, enduro, and even downhill racing.

=== Marathon ===
Mountain Bike Touring or Marathon is long-distance touring on dirt roads and single track with a mountain bike.

With the popularity of the Great Divide Trail, the Colorado Trail and other long-distance off-road biking trails, specially outfitted mountain bikes are increasingly being used for touring. Bike manufacturers like Salsa have even developed MTB touring bikes like the Fargo model.

Mixed Terrain Cycle-Touring or rough riding is a form of mountain-bike touring but involves cycling over a variety of surfaces and topography on a single route, with a single bicycle that is expected to be satisfactory for all segments. The recent surge in popularity of mixed-terrain touring is in part a reaction against the increasing specialization of the bicycle industry. Mixed-terrain bicycle travel has a storied history of focusing on efficiency, cost-effectiveness, and freedom of travel over varied surfaces.

=== Bikepacking ===
Bikepacking is a self-supported style of lightly loaded single or multiple-night mountain biking. Bikepacking is similar to bike touring; the two sports generally use different bikes and the main difference is the method of carrying gear. Bikepacking generally involves carrying less gear and using smaller frame bags while bike touring will use panniers.

A typical bikepacking set-up includes a frame bag, handlebar roll, seat pack, and backpack and typical gear includes lightweight and basic camping gear, and a bike repair kit.

Mountain bikes are generally used as many bike packing destinations are reached via forest-service roads or singletrack trails. Mountain bikes specific to bike-packing use a slightly taller frame to get the maximum frame bag capacity. This is achieved by using a longer headtube, a more horizontal top tube, and a reduced stem degree.

Generally, bikepackers tend to cover anywhere from 25 to 75 miles (40 – 120 km) in a given day as the riding can be technical.

=== Snow biking ===
Snow biking is downhill mountain bike racing on an alpine skiing course.

=== Adaptive mountain biking ===
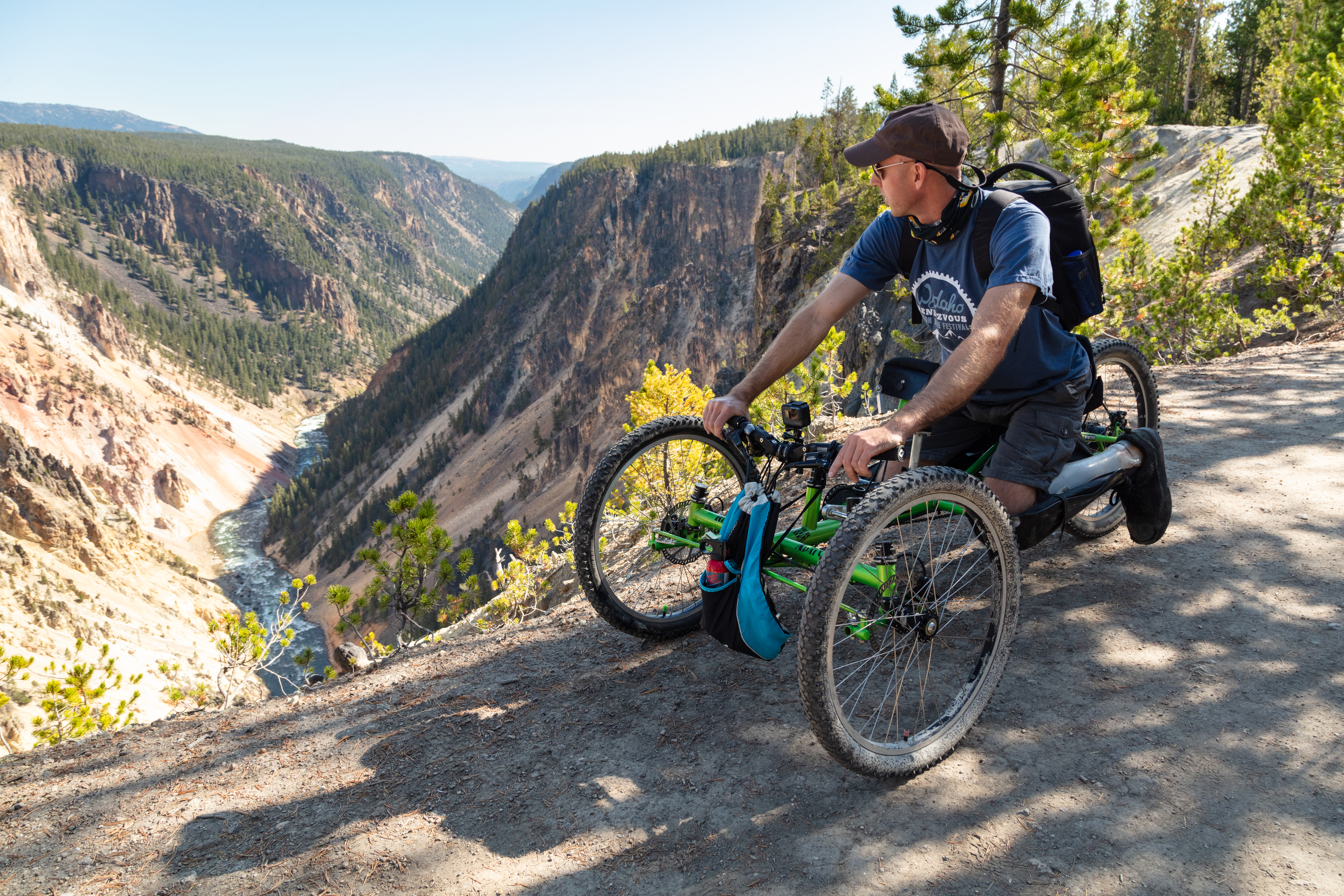
An adaptive rider navigating a trail using an off-road adaptive MTB

Adaptive mountain biking (aMTB) is a form of mountain biking that enables riders with disabilities to participate in off-road cycling. The discipline involves specialized bikes, inclusive trail designs and adaptive programs to allow riders to enjoy off-road trails safely. Adaptive mountain biking has organized events, competitions, and dedicated trails worldwide, and is recognized as a distinct discipline within disability sports.

== Health benefits ==
Cycling and green exercises have proven positive effects on self-esteem and total mood disturbance. Mountain biking is proven to improve mental health and well-being relating to coping abilities and reducing stress. There are strong links between outdoor environments and their therapeutic potential.

== Risks ==
Risk of injury is present when mountain biking, especially in the more extreme disciplines like downhill biking, freeride and dirt jumping. Injuries range from minor wounds, such as cuts and abrasions from falls on gravel or other surfaces, to major injuries such as broken bones, head or spinal injuries resulting from impacts with rocks, trees or the terrain being ridden on. Another risk factor is that mountain biking often takes place in wilderness or remote areas so emergency response can be delayed in the event of sustained injury.

Protective equipment can protect against minor injuries and reduce the extent or seriousness of major impacts, but may not protect a rider from major impacts or accidents. To reduce the risk of injury, a rider will also take steps to minimize the risk of accidents, and thus the potential for injury; by choosing trails which fall within the range of their experience level, ensuring that they are fit enough to deal with the trail they have chosen, and keeping their bike in top mechanical condition.

Lastly, maintenance of the rider's bike is carried out more frequently for mountain biking than for utility cycling or casual commuter biking. Mountain biking places higher demands on every part of the bike. Jumps and impacts can crack the frame or damage components or the tire rims, and steep, fast descents can quickly wear out brake pads. Since the widespread adoption of hydraulic and mechanical disk brakes on most mountain bikes from the late 1990s, the issues of brake pad wear, misalignment with, or slippage of rim brake pads on rims designed for rim brakes or "V brakes" have become a non-issue. Thus, whereas a casual rider may only check over and maintain their bike every few months, a mountain biker will check and properly maintain the bike before and after every ride.

== Advocacy organizations ==
Mountain bikers have faced land access issues from the beginning of the sport. Some areas where the first mountain bikers have ridden have faced extreme restrictions or the elimination of riding.

This opposition has led to the development of local, regional, and international mountain bike groups. The different groups that formed generally work to create new trails, maintain existing trails, and help existing trails that may have issues. Groups work with private and public entities from the individual landowner to city parks departments, on up through the state level at the DNR, and into the federal level. Different groups will work individually or together to achieve results.

Advocacy organizations work through numerous methods such as education, trail workdays, and trail patrols. Examples of the education and advocacy group can provide include: Educating local bicycle riders, property managers, and other user groups on the proper development of trails, and on the International Mountain Bicycling Association's (IMBA), "Rules of the Trail." Examples of trail work days can include: Flagging, cutting, and signing a new trail, or removing downed trees after a storm. A trail patrol is a bike rider who has had some training to help assist others (including non-cyclists), trail users.

The IMBA is a non-profit advocacy group whose mission is to create, enhance and preserve trail opportunities for mountain bikers worldwide. IMBA serves as an umbrella organization for mountain biking advocacy worldwide and represents more than 700 affiliated mountain biking groups. The group was originally formed to fight widespread trail closures. In 1988, five California mountain bike clubs linked to form IMBA. The founding clubs were: Concerned Off-Road Bicyclists Association, Bicycle Trails Council East Bay, Bicycle Trails Council Marin, Sacramento Rough Riders, and Responsible Organized Mountain.

== Environmental impact ==
According to a review published by the International Mountain Bicycling Association, the environmental impact of mountain biking, as a relatively new sport, is poorly understood. The review notes that "as with all recreational pursuits, it is clear that mountain biking contributes some degree of environmental degradation". Mountain biking can result in both soil and vegetation damage, which can be caused by skidding, but also by the construction of unauthorised features such as jumps and bridges, and trails themselves. Several studies have reported that a mountain bike's impact on a given length of trail surface is comparable to that of a hiker, and substantially less than that of an equestrian or motorized off-road vehicle.

A critical literature review by Jason Lathrop on the ecological impact of mountain biking notes that while recreational trail use in general is well studied, few studies explore the specific impact of mountain biking. He quotes the Bureau of Land Management: "An estimated 13.5 million mountain bicyclists visit public lands each year to enjoy the variety of trails. What was once a low use activity that was easy to manage has become more complex".

The environmental impacts of mountain biking can be greatly reduced by not riding on wet or sensitive trails, keeping speeds modest so as to minimize cornering forces and braking forces, not skidding, and staying on the trail.

Mountain biking has been demonstrated to act as a human-mediated form of seed dispersal. Due to advancements in technology, mountain bikers have begun to move onto trail networks once only accessible by hikers. The nature of their movement patterns also plays an important role as a vector for seed dispersal. Mountain bikes are not bound to any specific type of infrastructure and can therefore move freely between ecological environments acting as a connecting dispersal vector between habitats. Combined with their relatively long range and speeds they also contribute to long-range dispersal. In an effort to understand and assess the socio-ecological consequences of mountain bikes as a vector for seed dispersal Fabio Weiss, Tyler J. Brummer, and Gesine Pufal conducted an environmental impact study on forest trails in Freiburg, Germany. The results of the study found that although the majority of seeds detached from tires within the first 20 to 70 feet (5 to 20 m), small portions of seeds were still present after 700 to 2,000 feet (200 to 500 m) contributing to moderate dispersal. The potential for long-distance dispersal was found through the transport of seeds on areas of the bike that did not come into frequent contact with the ground. The study also found that the majority of participants only cleaned their bikes on average every 40 miles (70 km) or every two rides. Rides executed in two different areas have the potential to connect previously unconnected habitats creating the potential for unwanted plant invasions.

To mitigate the accidental dispersal of an unwanted invasive species, the authors of the study proposed the following measures to support conservation:

a) Clean the bike between rides in different habitats, before traveling and especially before entering sensitive natural areas and regions.
b) Control weeds and non-native species at trailheads and trail margins.
c) Educate mountain bike riders about the potential dispersal of different species (good stewardship begets riding privileges).
d) Encourage cooperation between mountain bikers and managing authorities (avoid condescending regulations, establishment of monitored designated riding areas).

== See also ==
- Mountain bike
- Mountain bike racing
- Downhill mountain biking
- Enduro (mountain biking)
- Singletrack
- List of professional mountain bikers
- Mountain Bike Hall of Fame
- Glossary of cycling
