= Klunkerz: A Film About Mountain Bikes =

2006 documentary film

Klunkerz: A Film About Mountain Bikes is a 2006 documentary about mountain bike history during its formative period in Northern California. It examines the relationships of the Marin County hippies, athletes, and entrepreneurs who were directly responsible for popularizing off-road cycling. The film includes many interviews with those present during the embryonic stages of the sport, including Gary Fisher, Charlie Kelly, Joe Breeze, Tom Ritchey, Mike Sinyard, and Otis Guy, and covers "the treacherous old Repack races." The film was written, produced, and directed by independent California filmmaker Billy Savage and released on October 8, 2006.

== Festivals and awards ==
Awards

- "2009 Cycling Film of the Year" (Competitor Film Festival, San Diego)
- "Make Your Own Legends Award" (Boulder Adventure Film Festival)
- 2007 "Documentary - Feature Jury Commendation" (Durango Independent Film Festival)

Festivals - Official Selection

- 2006 Mill Valley Film Festival
- 2007 Durango Independent Film Festival
- 2007 Newport Beach Film Festival
- San Luis Obispo Film Festival
- 2007 Bicycle Film Festival (New York City, NY)
- Competitor Film Festival (San Diego)
- International Bicycling Film Festival (Sydney and Melbourne, Australia)
- 2008 International Cycling Video Festival (Bochum, Germany)

== Credits ==
=== Starring ===
- Alan Bond
- Joe Breeze
- Bob Burrows
- Wende Cragg
- Carter Cox
- Tom Cox
- Charlie Cunningham
- Gary Fisher
- Otis Guy
- Charlie Kelly
- Chris Lang
- Russ Mahon
- James McLean
- Jacquie Phelan
- Steve Potts
- Tom Ritchey
- John Finley Scott
- Mike Sinyard
- Tom Slivka - “Eli”
- Robert Stewart
- Fred Wolf
- John York

=== With ===
- Todd Beeson
- Johnny Callahan
- Robert Craft
- Tom Cookson - “Cookie”
- Gil De La Roza
- Antony Durbin - “Durbo”
- Kevin Krueger
- Harry Harris - “Hairmo”
- Craig Mitchell
- Lyl Slocome - “Lyemo”
- Marc Vendetti
- Stevie Wilde

=== Photography ===
- Wende Cragg - Rolling Dinosaur Archives
- Jeff Archer – First Flight Bikes
- Eric Lafferty – Old Mountain Bikes
- Mush Emmons – Phantomatic Bikes

=== Consultants ===
- Rudy Contratti - “The Grand Wazoo of Fairfax”

=== Special Thanks ===
- Peter Alexander
- Aple Shirts
- Breezer Bikes
- Tom Ritchey Custom Cycles
- Gary Fisher Bicycles
- Specialized Bicycles
- Wilderness Trail Bikes
- Shimano USA
- Steve Potts Bicycles
- Skidtown Bicycles
- The Marin Bicycle Coalition
- Safe Routes to Schools
- Trips for Kids
- The Marin Historical Society
- Menasha Ridge Press
- Hoss Technical Gear
- The WaveStone Group
- The Mountain Bike Hall of Fame
- The Re-Cyclery
- Fairfax Cyclery
- Sunshine Bicycles
- Gravy Wheels
- Manny's Bikes
- Mikes Bicycles
- Palms Cyclery
- Cupertino Bike Shop
- I. Martin Imports
- The Fat Tire Flyer
- DirtRag
- Decline Magazine
- Bike Magazine
- BMX Plus!
- Hi-Torque Publications
- Bicycle Sport
- Rodale Press
- H3 Publications
- Menasha Ridge Press
- Smithsonian
- Rolling Stone
- KPIX
- Bill Champlin
- The Sons of Champlin
- Jerry, Bobby, Janis
- The Estate of William Nealy
- Ian Stewart
- Eric Fletcher
- Michael Brown
- Amazing Grace Music
- Iron Springs Brewery
- Lagunitas Brewing Company
- The Broken Drum Brewery
- Red Bull
- Grace Productions
- Josh Bender
- Kyle Strait
- Jeff Brown
- Frank J. Berto
- Kim Mitchell
- Marilyn Price
- Dustin Brady
- Kim Baenisch
- Brian Verner
- Brendt Barbour
- Bob Sehlinger
- Vance Sprock
- Jory Prum
- Ariadyne Scott
- Keven Krueger
- Leon Mahon
- Hal Muscat
- Florie Savage
- Isabella Savage
- William Savage Sr.
- Joan A. Savage

== See also ==
- List of films about bicycles and cycling
