= Specialized Stumpjumper =

Model of mountain bike

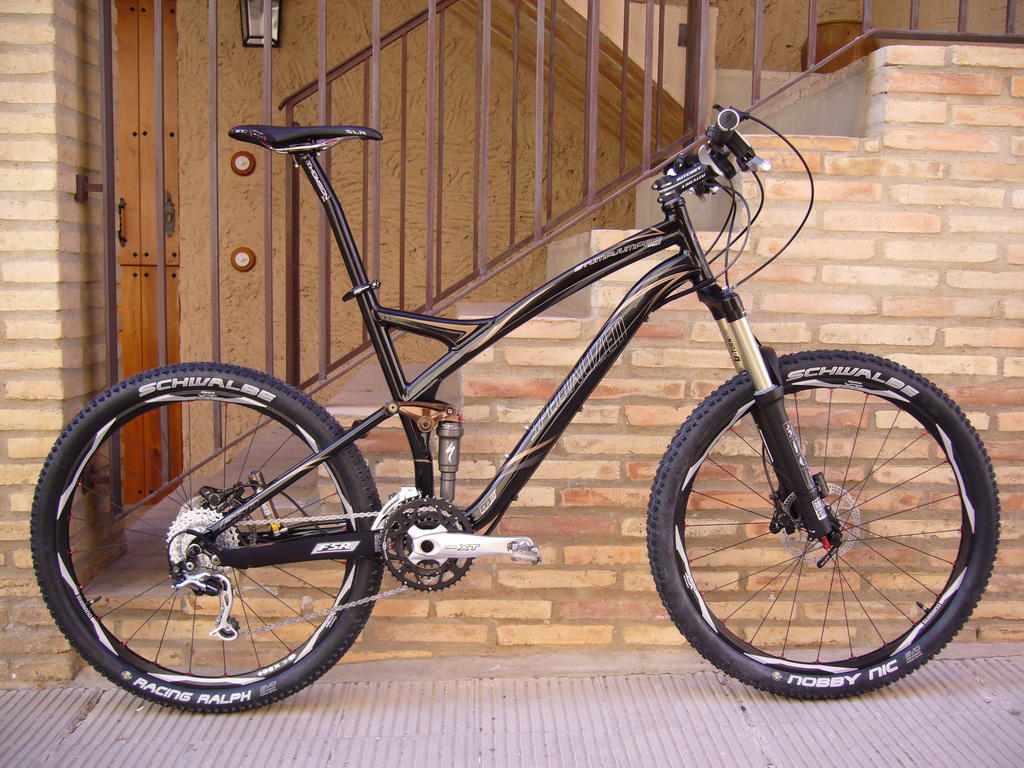
A 2008 Specialized Stumpjumper with full suspension

The Specialized Stumpjumper is a mountain bike produced by Specialized Bicycle Components. When it was first produced in 1981, the Stumpjumper was the first mass-production mountain bike. The Stumpjumper is still in production, although its design has changed significantly since it was first sold. Stumpjumpers have been raced professionally by riders including Christoph Sauser and Ned Overend.

== History ==
Specialized started to produce the Stumpjumper in 1981, making it the first mass-production mountain bike. The first Stumpjumper was produced in Japan and was based on a design for a custom-made bike originally marketed by Tom Ritchey, Gary Fisher and Charlie Kelly. Specialized's founder Mike Sinyard has explained that the company's aim was to "make a bike on a production basis but as though it was a custom bike". The first Stumpjumpers had welded steel frames because the lugged and brazed frames that designer Tim Neenan wanted to use were not available at the time. The original bike had a modified BMX stem and handlebars based on Magura motorcycle handlebars. The bike was equipped with 15-speed Suntour ARX GT gears, originally designed for use on road bikes, and the Stumpjumper also featured Mafac cantilever brakes and a TA Cyclotourist chainset, both designed for touring bikes. It had no suspension. The bike weighed just under 30 pounds (14 kg).

After the first production run in 1981, around 500 were imported to the United States over the course of the next year. The original Stumpjumper was sold for US$750 as a complete bike or $395 for the frame only. Specialized marketed it as an affordable and versatile bike for a new sport, namely mountain biking, and used the slogan "The bike for all reasons". Initially, bike retailers were skeptical about the Stumpjumper, with some asking Sinyard what he was doing with a "big kids' BMX". However, the first shipment of 125 bikes sold out in six days. According to sports journalist Ben Hewitt, the Stumpjumper "was a resounding success" and its introduction contributed to the rapid rise in popularity of the new sport.

An original Stumpjumper is displayed in the Smithsonian Institution in Washington, D.C. A limited edition reproduction of the original Stumpjumper, featuring modern components and named the Stumpjumper Classic, was produced in 2007 to mark the bike's 25th anniversary. It was available for US$1,300.

== Present day ==
Specialized continue to produce the Stumpjumper, which, like mountain bikes in general, has evolved significantly since 1981 and seen iterations in full (front and rear) suspension and hardtail (front suspension only) options, with the former named the Stumpjumper FSR until the Stumpjumper line-up became full-suspension only.

== Use by professional riders ==
Professional mountain bikers who ride Stumpjumpers include Christoph Sauser and Ned Overend. Overend won the 1990 Mountain Bike World Championships – the first ever event of its kind – on a carbon-fiber prototype Stumpjumper.
