= Joe Murray (cyclist) =

Personal information
- Born: December 4, 1963 (age 62)

Cycling career
- Sport: Cycling
- Rider type: mountain biker

Joe Murray (born December 4, 1963) is an American pioneer in the mountain bike movement. Starting out as a professional mountain bike racer, he later moved into bicycle design. Murray was one of the original inductees (1988) into the Mountain Bike Hall of Fame. He was the first mountain biker inducted into the United States Bicycling Hall of Fame in 1999.

== Racing highlights ==
- 1980 Zero's Notch Race, 11th overall, 1st novice, first race.
- 1984 NORBA National Champion
- 1984 8 straight wins
- 1985 NORBA National Champion
- 1985 12 straight wins (to date, unmatched by any male mountain bike)
- 1989 Winner NORBA National Points Series Crystal Mountain, WA
- 1989 6th overall NORBA National Points Series

== Other achievements ==
He has raced 400 races in over 10 years with over 73 victories. He is a five-time winner of the Rockhopper Race (the first popular mountain bike race) and three-time winner of the Whiskeytown Downhill (one of first "classic" mountain bike races). He was the first mountain bike cyclist to be inducted into the United States Bicycling Hall of Fame.

== Early life ==
Murray grew up in Fairfax, California. He started riding on dirt roads in Marin County on a 1950's Rollfast cruiser bike. In 1981 he purchased a Schwinn Spitfire 5 from Mike’s Bikes in San Rafael, California which he began to upgrade piece by piece. In 1983 at the age of 17, he entered his first race called Zero’s Notch which consisted of the Pine Mountain loop and Repack downhill course near Fairfax, winning the Novice class.

== Research & design achievements ==
- Designed ten tires for three different companies.
- Product designer for Marin, Kona, and VooDoo Cycles.
- Official product test rider for Shimano.
- Designed the first titanium mountain bike frame for Merlin.
- First to race extensively on off-road titanium frames.
- Designed the 1993 Mountain Bike Magazine "Bike of the Year"
- Designed titanium stems, seat posts, bottom brackets, bar ends, fork and other components.
