= Repack (mountain bike race) =

Mountain bike race in California, United States

Repack Downhill Time Trial
- Nickname: Repack
- Begins: October 21, 1976
- Founders: Charlie Kelly and Fred Wolfe

The Repack race, held on October 21, 1976, was a seminal event the history of mountain biking. It took place on Pine Mountain just outside of Fairfax, California in Marin County, and played a crucial role in the development of mountain bikes. Early riders modified Schwinn cruisers, known as “clunkers,” for the rough terrain. The race got its name because the coaster brakes on these 1930s bikes had to be repacked with grease after each run.

Though only about 200 racers participated between 1976 and 1979, the event attracted pioneers like Charlie Kelly, Joe Breeze, Gary Fisher, Otis Guy, Tom Ritchey, Charlie Cunningham and Wende Cragg, who helped shape modern mountain biking. While off-road cycling had earlier innovators—such as John Finley Scott in 1953 and groups like Cupertino's Morrow Dirt Club—it was the Marin County riders who transformed the sport into a global phenomenon.

Joe Breeze tested the first purpose-built mountain bike, the JBX1 "Breezer 1" at Repack in 1977. Charlie Kelly, Repack's original organizer, and Gary Fisher co-founded MountainBikes, a company in Fairfax, California, that helped define the new fat-tired bicycle category. Fisher still holds the fastest time on the Repack course, and the race remains a milestone in mountain biking history.
