= Mark Grieve =

American artist (born 1965)

- Born: July 1965 (age 61); Marin County, California, U.S.
- Education: San Francisco Art Institute; College of Marin
- Occupations: Artist, sculptor

Mark Grieve (born July 1965) is an American contemporary artist. He practices in a variety of media including found objects and large metal sculpture as well as site-specific installations, performance, and public art.

== Early life and education ==
A native of the San Francisco Bay Area, Grieve studied painting and drawing formally at the San Francisco Art Institute and College of Marin and apprenticed in Japanese ceramics. Grieve's art was displayed at the Susan Cummins Gallery in Mill Valley, California, where it was collected by actor and comedian Robin Williams.

== Career ==
=== Sculpture and public art ===
Since 2006, Grieve and artistic collaborator Ilana Spector have focused on the construction of highly site-specific public art sculptures using a variety of media. They have worked with museums, governmental agencies, universities, professional races and non-profit organizations, festivals, and companies. In 2009, Grieve was the recipient of a Pollock-Krasner Foundation Grant.

In August 2010, they erected "Cyclisk", a colorful sixty-five foot-high Egyptian-style obelisk made from unusable bicycles parts they had collected, disassembled, cleaned and welded to form an obelisk shape. They collected unusable dump-bound bicycle parts from Trips for Kids/Recyclery in San Rafael, California, Bici Centro in Santa Barbara, California and Community Bikes in Santa Rosa, California. Funded by the City of Santa Rosa's Percent for Art initiative, "Cyclisk" is the largest public art project in the region and stands at the intersection of Santa Rosa Avenue and South A Street in Santa Rosa.

In 2011, Grieve and Spector installed Full Circles, a dynamic constellation of individually-distinct hand-polished steel hoops suspended twenty feet from the dome of the Visitacion Valley Library Branch in San Francisco, California, for the San Francisco Arts Commission.

=== Temporary-related sculpture ===
In 2005 and 2006, Grieve led the Burning Man Temple project, originated by artist David Best. In 2005, he designed and oversaw the construction of the festival's “Temple of Dreams. ” Then, in 2006, he led a team of volunteers to create the "Temple of Hope," named one of the best twelve art pieces at the festival.In 2007, Together with partner Ilana Spector, Grieve created "Bike Arch," aka "Bicycle Arch" aka "Bike Rack" a large scale piece using re-purposed bicycles as a medium. The archway was created from approximately 240 unusable junk bicycle parts headed for the dump from bicycle cooperatives. Soaring over the entrance to Burning Man's Center camp, "Bike Arch" was located in the central area in "Black Rock City" where bikes form the main mode of transportation. The artwork appeared in South Park Season 14, Episode 13, referencing Burning Man as well as the official 2012 London Olympic Opening Ceremonies program to illustrate the sport of cycling.

=== Performance art ===
“THE PIG" was a dinner/happening in the middle of the Black Rock Desert hosted by Grieve and Spector that took place in July 2008. THE PIG was a collaborative artwork – a fourteen-foot sculpture of a fluorescent pink pig standing upon an elaborate art-deco base bestowed with fireworks – accompanied by a seven-course five-star meal for seventy-five people. Submitted before the 2008 financial crisis and 2008 United States elections, this "Salon des Réfusés" brought out each person's relationship to swine – from political (pork-pie politics) to celebratory. The blank Black Rock desert canvas provided a dynamic backdrop for a one-time art-happening barbecue-of-the-ridiculous, crescendoing with the burning of the pig sculpture. Residents of Gerlach, Nevada and guests were invited free of charge to the formal dinner. On a sixty-foot-long white linen traditionally-set table, nationally ranked BBQ chefs provided barbecue. During dessert, the sculpture of the large pink pig, base included, was burned, punctuated by a fireworks display, initiating a three-part performance piece that called attention to culinary, sculptural and performance art.

Act II was called "An Exercise in Democracy – for Under 500 Bucks," in which Grieve and Spector picketed outside the 2008 Burning Man event. In a year the festival's theme was "The American Dream," this performance piece / peaceful protest, brought attention to their grant process. Armed with three 1930s-style picket signs reading "Art on Strike," “B.R.C. LLC HARD ON Art," and "Brush Your Teeth," outside the gate the artists handed out 2000 flyers stating their case for a transparent grant process and treating artists with dignity. In an ironic twist, setting legal precedent, they founded a "Freedom of Speech Zone" directly outside the event. In July 2009, Grieve and Spector returned to the blank Nevada desert with a team of seventy artist collaborators for Act III "Il Mazzolin di Fiori," the finale, a thirty-foot-high "bouquet" of sculptural burnable flowers accompanied by another seven-course meal, this time Italian-themed and mostly vegetarian, topped off with lighting the bouquet of burnable flowers aflame.

== Other public art works ==
- 2015 City of Davis/UC Davis, Third Street Improvement Project, Davis, California
- 2015 North Natomas Regional Park Public Art Project, Sacramento, California
- 2015 Norfolk Botanical Garden, Norfolk, Virginia
- 2012 "Ring Roll," California State University, Chico, California
- 2011 "Full Circles," San Francisco Arts Commission Visitacion Valley Library, San Francisco
- 2010 "Cyclisk," City of Santa Rosa, Santa Rosa, California
- 2009 "Pacific Rim," City of San Rafael & Artworks Downtown, San Rafael, California
- 2009 "Double Archway," City of Glendale, Jazz and Blues Festival, Glendale, Arizona
- 2009 "Wheel Arch," City of San Buenaventura Public Art Commission, Ventura, California
- 2008 "Flat Heaven," City of San Rafael & Artworks Downtown, San Rafael, California
- 2008 "Circles and Trees," City of San Rafael & Artworks Downtown, San Rafael, California

Member of several public arts registries, including Atlanta, Baltimore, San Francisco, Washington state, San Antonio, Oregon, Seattle, Oakland, Palm Springs and El Paso.
