= Mike Rust =

Cyclist

- Born: Michael Damien Rust; Colorado Springs, Colorado
- Died: March 31, 2009 (55); Saguache County, Colorado
- Other name: 'Mike the Bike'
- Known for: Bike building, mountain biking

Mike Rust (died March 31, 2009) was an American cyclist and bicycle framebuilder, and is considered one of the forefathers of mountain biking.

== Early life ==
Mike Rust was born in Colorado Springs, Colorado and was the fourth of eight children. During his teenage years, Rust enjoyed building and riding bikes and also built a motorcycle, hiding the chassis from his parents by storing it under his bed. In the seventh grade he built his first mountain bike with 20-inch wheels, flat handlebars and a leather seat. Cycling was a passion amongst Rust and his brothers, who were known as the 'Rolling Rust Brothers', and they enjoyed riding penny-farthing bicycles together.

== Cycling ==
Rust road raced in the 1970s in Colorado and became a member of United States Cycling Federation. During the 1980s, he and a group of friends set off on a 400-mile trek from Colorado Springs, crossing the Great Divide and aiming to get to Crested Butte. Rust stayed in Crested Butte, working at several bike shops and modifying bikes and taking part in the developing mountain biking scene. After spending some time in Arizona working at Bisbee Bicycles he returned to Crested Butte and continued modifying bikes to make them more suitable for mountain riding. Along with friend Don McClung he started Colorado Cyclery in Salida. During his time at Colorado Cyclery he developed an elevated chain stay bike, known as the Shortie.

He won the Colorado State Games Mountain Bike Race in 1989 and was inducted into the Mountain Bike Hall of Fame in 1991.

== Disappearance ==
On March 31, 2009, Rust noticed tire tracks on the driveway of his home in the San Luis Valley and when he entered his home he realized it had been burglarized. At 7 PM, he made a call to a friend, Mary Ann Bavaria, frantically saying that he was going to try and track the thieves. He left the groceries he had just bought on the kitchen counter, and rode into the desert on a Honda CRF 250 to try and find the thieves.

When Bavaria was unable to reach him the next day, she visited Rust's house with two of his brothers to try and find him. After calling the sheriff and reporting him missing, a search was commenced, with dog tracking teams, helicopters and a fixed-wing aircraft taking part.

Four days after the search commenced a blood-covered vest and the wooden handle of the gun were found. DNA testing would later prove the blood as being Rust's. The missing Honda motorbike was discovered a month later.

== Investigation ==
Seven years after his disappearance, the Colorado Bureau of Investigation found human remains in Saguache County on January 8, 2016. Lying five miles from Rust's house, the remains, which included a bicycle-sprocket belt buckle, were confirmed as Rust's on April 25, 2016. Charles Gonzales was arrested over Rust's death in June 2016.

In December 2017, Gonzales was found guilty of first-degree murder with intent / deliberation, first-degree felony murder, first-degree burglary, theft, tampering with evidence and abuse of a corpse. During the trial, it was revealed that Gonzales had burglarized the house and later shot Rust in the back of the head before burying the body. Gonzales was sentenced to life without parole after the guilty verdict was announced.

== In the media ==
A documentary about Rust's life was released in 2015, called The Rider and the Wolf. Made by filmmaker Nathan Ward, it was screened at the 2015 Denver Film Festival.
