= Cruiser bicycle =

Bicycle type

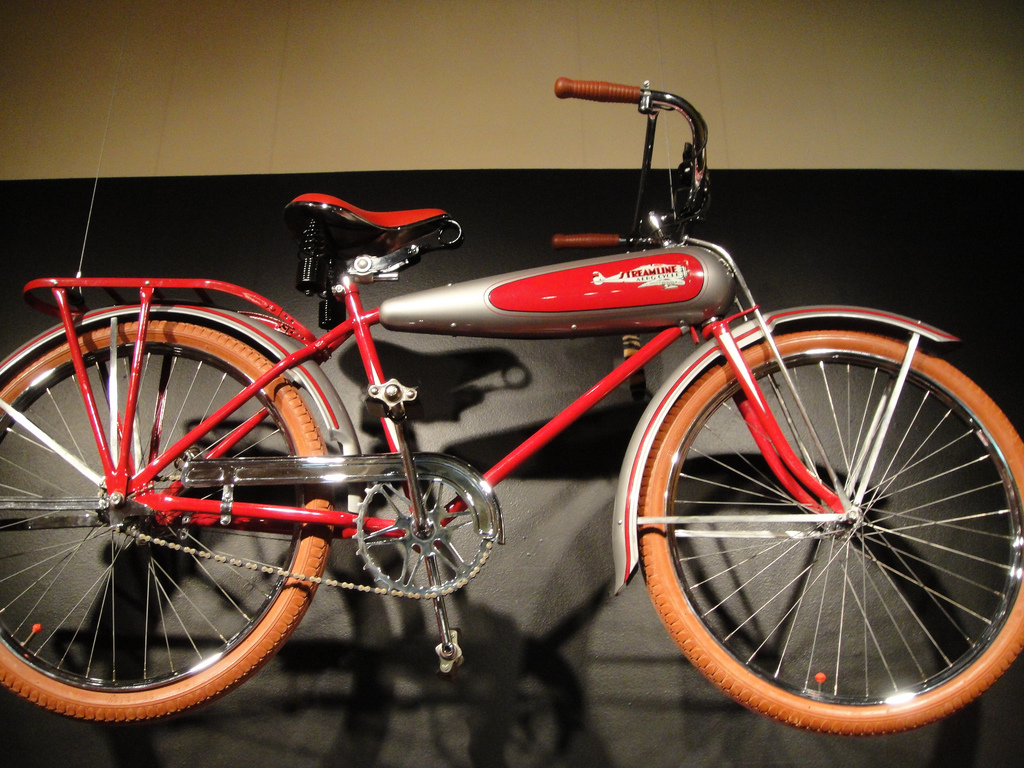
Schwinn AeroCycle in Longmont Museum & Cultural Center

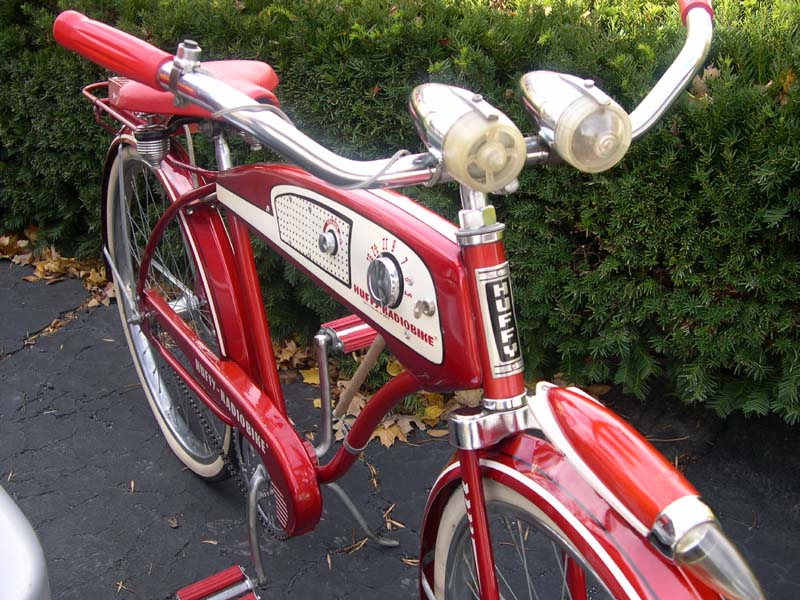
1950s Huffy Radio Bicycle

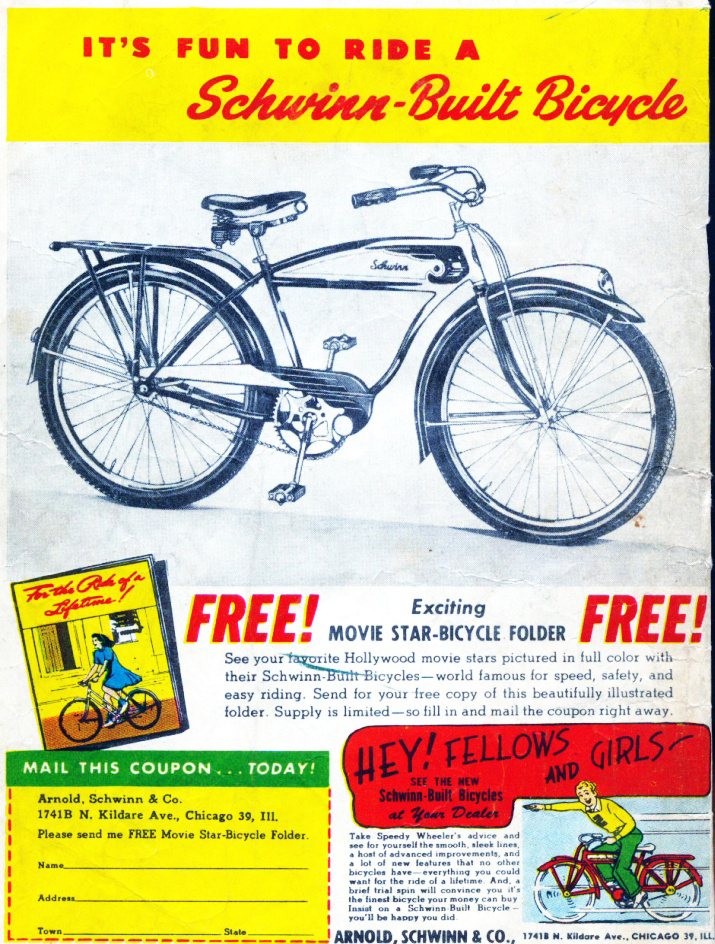
Schwinn advertisement from 1946

A cruiser bicycle, also known as a beach cruiser or (formerly) motobike, is a bicycle that usually combines balloon tires, an upright seating posture, a single-speed drivetrain, and straightforward steel construction with expressive styling. Cruisers are popular among casual bicyclists and vacationers because they are very stable and easy to ride, but their heavy weight and balloon tires tend to make them rather slow. Another common feature is their ability to be customized with accessories including fenders, lights and saddle bags. They are designed for use primarily on paved roads, low speeds/distances, and are included in the non-racing/non-touring class and heavyweight or middleweight styles of the road bicycle type.

The bikes, noted for their durability and heavy weight, were the most popular bicycle in the United States from the early 1930s through the 1950s, and have enjoyed renewed popularity since the late 1990s.

== History ==
=== Development ===
Schwinn was one of many manufacturers who contributed to the development of the cruiser at a time when U.S. bicycle sales had declined sharply due to the Great Depression; adults purchased few bicycles, which were seen as luxury products intended largely for sport or recreation. In response to other manufacturers' innovations, Schwinn conceived their own sturdy, affordable bicycle designed for the more resilient youth market—originally marketing the Schwinn B-10E Motorbike—which resembled a motorcycle but carried no motor—in 1933. Mr. Schwinn adapted features from the Henderson and Excelsior motorcycles that his (formerly purchased) bankrupt company had built during the 1920s, including a heavy "cantilevered" frame with two top tubes and 2.125-inch-wide (54.0 mm) "balloon" tires from Germany. Schwinn, like others, copied what they saw going on in Europe. Both Sears and Montgomery Ward had bicycles in 1932 that had balloon tires in the USA, a full year before Schwinn. And the streamline movement in bicycles was really pioneered by Sears and Huffman. The resulting bicycles could endure abuse that could damage others.

In 1934, Schwinn successfully re-styled the B-10E, renaming it the Aero Cycle. While the Aero Cycle featured no technical improvements over the original B-10E, its streamlined frame, faux gas tank, and battery-powered headlight came to define the cruiser 'look'. Modern cruiser bicycles retain these design elements, (except sometimes for the tank and/or light accessories). Schwinn is credited with kicking off the balloon tire craze when they introduced their offerings for 1933. By 1954, the balloon tire was tired and on its way out. That's when Schwinn introduced the middleweight. All other manufacturers followed suit in quick succession. The middleweights would last well into the 1970s.

=== 1950s heyday ===
Cruisers were popular throughout the 1930s and 40s and gained greater postwar success. Their combination of substantial weight (some models weighing over 70 pounds), single speed mechanicals (often New Departure Model D oil coaster hubs), and wide tires (26 × 2.25″ 559) made the bicycles primarily suited to flat terrain. They were popular with paperboys and bicycle couriers.

Competing firms including the Cleveland Welding Corporation (CWC) which made many of the Ward's Hawthornes and Shelby Flyers, later American Machine and Foundry AMF (Roadmaster) after the merger that took place in 1954, Westfield (Columbia), Monark-Silver King (bought out by Huffy in 1957), Snyder Rollfast, Evan's Colson, Murray (Elgin, JC Higgins and later Sears), and Huffman (Huffy) used styling features and distinctive models to attract buyers—including a Donald Duck bike (Shelby Flyer) with quacking horn, "cowboy" models named after Gene Autry or Hopalong Cassidy (Snyder Rollfast), and details such as fringed saddlebags, capgun holsters, proprietary springer fork suspensions, motorcycle-style horn tanks, and extensive chrome plating. The Huffy "RadioBike"® (one word) featured an electron-tube radio built into the tank and an antenna and battery pack on the rear carrier.

=== Decline of the cruiser ===
During the late 1950s and early 1960s, bicycles imported from Great Britain and Continental Europe became popular, especially lighter and more nimble sports roadster models or "English racer". These models featured three-speed gearing, taller wheels, narrower tires and lighter weight and greater hill-climbing ability. By the late 1950s, U.S. manufacturers such as Schwinn ramped up production of the English racer. Schwinn was no stranger to this style. Between the 28 inch wheeled track bikes that they built between the turn of the 20th century and the 1920s and the lightweight offerings they introduced in the 30s such as the Continental, Varsity and Superior, they knew their way around. These prewar bikes could be had with imported half inch pitch drivetrains with freewheels and hand brakes. In postwar production, Schwinn began producing lightweights again in the mid 40s with models such as the New World. These bikes could be had with Sturmey Archer 3 speeds from England and had chromoly tubing. To popularize these bicycles they enlisted the help of Hollywood celebrities. Ronald Reagan is seen riding one in the 1947 Schwinn catalog.

The cruiser also ceded market share to muscle and lowrider bikes, which Schwinn introduced in 1963, featuring banana seats, oversized shift levers, and ape-hanger bars inspired by West coast motorcycle customizers—which in turn gave birth to the modern BMX bike, while the cruiser went into a steep sales decline.

By 1972, a new wave of lightweight derailleur-equipped bicycles led a wave of new consumer interest in recreational bicycling, resulting in the bike boom. Derailleur-equipped sport bikes or ten speeds inspired by European racing bicycles soon dominated the adult market. Schwinn introduced their 10 speeds in the early 60s starting first with the Continental, a name they resurrected, and later the Varsity. The Varsity was offered between 1960 and 1962 as an 8 speed and as a 10 speed between 1963 and 1982.

While largely obsolete by the late 1960s, the cruiser remained popular for utility and recreational use at the beach, where they soon earned the title of "beach cruisers". The term "beach cruiser" started in 1976 at Recycled Cycles in Newport Beach when Larry McNeely coined the phrase and used it as their trademark for the production of the modern Beach Cruiser. Secondhand cruisers found new life on America's coastlines as practical transportation for beach bums and surfers.

By the late 70s, Schwinn reintroduced heavyweights, but this time with a blend of BMX parts. The Spitfire was reintroduced as a heavyweight for 1977 and was sold through 1979 with reissue S2s that were made in Hungary. In 1980, Schwinn introduced the Cruiser Series which has survived multiple iterations and has been offered more or less continuously through present. The most desirable Cruisers are the Cruiser, Deluxe Cruiser and Cruiser 5. The Cruiser Six was made by Giant, for Schwinn. The 4, 7 and Alloy as well as the other models were made as part of the Signature Series by Schwinn's current parent, in China.

Schwinn registered the trademark "Schwinn Cruiser"® with the U.S. Patent and Trademark Office in November 1979.

TRAC International Corporation of Atlanta, Georgia, registered the trademarks "Beach Cruiser"® and "Street Cruiser"® with the USPTO in December 1983, for their Taiwanese made bicycles.

The release of the 1985 film Pee-wee's Big Adventure highlighted the main character's cross-country search for his lost custom-built heavily-accessorized horn-tank bicycle.

=== As inspiration for the mountain bike ===
In the early Seventies, two groups of enthusiasts: the Larkspur Canyon Gang, from Larkspur (long-time speed-riders down Mount Tamalpais), and later members of Velo-Club Tamalpais from Fairfax and San Anselmo in Marin County, California began group rides in the canyons and over ridges, up and down the fireroads around Mount Tamalpais, later racing bikes downhill in a race they called "Repack" because the ride was so grueling that riders had to repack their coaster brakes with grease after each run. The off-road terrain was rocky and the steep mountainside helped riders attain high speeds as they bounced and slammed over rocks and mud. Such harsh treatment caused regular road bikes to crumble, so the racers searched for a more durable and affordable alternative. They soon discovered that old balloon-tired "clunkers" (as they called them) could be had for $5.00 at a garage sale and would endure tremendous punishment. Soon, riders were snapping up these old cruisers, stripping off the heavy fenders and trim, and souped them up to improve downhill performance. Derailleur gears were added by Russ Mahon of The Morrow Dirt Club in Cupertino at the 1974 Marin County cyclo-cross and Gary Fisher's 1975 used a tandem rear hub (from a flea market) with internal steel drum brake and threaded for a freewheel derailleur cluster to his old Schwinn Excelsior bike, enabling him to ride up the mountain, as well as down. About the same time, another rider named Joe Breeze began tinkering with his own Schwinn Excelsior, making it more suited to the "Repack" course. Soon, both of them began to build and sell custom mountain bikes to fellow enthusiasts, launching a worldwide cycling phenomenon. In the late 1970s and early 1980s, cruiser frames formed the basis of the newly developed mountain bike. The late 1970s and early 1980s saw the emergence of interest in collecting old bicycles, and prices for balloon-tired classics climbed. A bicycle collecting community has developed, with newsletters and specialty shops focused on bicycle collectors. Gary Fisher was one of the main men behind the mountain bike. He was one of the original Tam Bombers and essentially commercialized the mountain bike.

== Cruiser bikes today ==
Cruisers' comfort, style, and affordability (compared to mountain and racing bikes) have led to renewed popularity in recent years. In late 1979, Schwinn produced the "Schwinn Cruiser" model. In the 1980s Huffy built the "Good Vibrations" beach cruiser, and Murray built the "Monterey" beach cruiser, both using product names, like beaches, with an association to the west coast of California. Then in the early to mid-1990s, Schwinn produced a series of cruiser models, including the "Cruiser Deluxe" (which featured a Phantom-style tank with horn, chrome fenders, white-wall balloon tires, rear rack, a springer fork, and two-tone blue or green frames). The cruiser resurgence continued in 1995, when Schwinn reissued the Black Phantom to celebrate the company's 100th birthday. During that same time frame, similar offerings appeared from Columbia (a limited reissue of the classic 1950s 5-Star was produced in the early 1990s), and Roadmaster. Harley-Davidson even licensed a cruiser bike with their logo and trademark styling. These helped stir up interest in cruisers, which brought them to the attention of aging Baby Boomers, who remembered the originals from their youth and now were reaching an age where a comfortable bike was more exciting than a fast bike, and who also had the money to buy whatever they wanted. The classic "retro" looks, reliable mechanical performance, comfortable ride, and relatively low price of cruisers (compared to mountain bikes or road racers) also appealed to young Gen Xers. Nearly every major bike manufacturer now offers at least one cruiser model, if not an entire line. Some notable contemporary manufactures include Electra Bicycle Company and Felt Bicycles. Cruiser sales have continued to rise over the past decade and today many towns have clubs sponsoring regular cruiser rides as a way to promote the low-tech, high fun aspect of cycling.

Three other contemporary bike trends are related to cruisers. For decades, Latino car enthusiasts have been lowering the suspension on older American cars to build "lowriders". Their younger siblings have begun building their own custom "lowrider bikes". Lowrider bicycles are usually built on old Schwinn Sting-Ray or other "muscle bike" frames, but the entire lowrider look of "old school" accessories such as springer forks and bullet headlights is in the cruiser tradition. Lowrider bike magazines and catalogs also feature cruisers and are a great source of accessories for cruiser owners. A similar trend is the sudden appearance of "chopper" bicycles over the past couple of years, in response to the surge of interest in custom motorcycles. Several manufacturers offer "chopper" style bikes in their cruiser range. These bikes usually feature a lower center of gravity, suspension forks, hot rod paint jobs, and large rear tires.

Finally, manufacturers have also introduced the "comfort bike" category, to combine the soft ride and upright posture of cruisers with a more conventionally styled bike. Comfort bikes have such features as fenders, suspension seatposts and forks, and large padded saddles with giant springs. All of these features are copied from cruisers, but redesigned to look more like regular road or hybrid bikes.

== See also ==
- Cruiser (motorcycle)
- Outline of cycling
- Road bicycle

== Bibliography ==
- Crown, Judith, and Coleman, Glenn, No Hands: The Rise and Fall of the Schwinn Bicycle Company, An American Institution, New York: Henry Holt (1996)
- Pridmore, Jay, and Hurd, Jim, The American Bicycle, Motorbooks International (1995)
