= Leatt-Brace =

The Leatt-Brace is a neck brace designed to help reduce neck injuries in helmeted sports, including Supercross, motocross, enduro, roadracing, downhill-type mountain biking, BMX, ATV, street riding, karting, and snowmobiling. The brace is marketed and distributed worldwide by the Leatt Corporation, a Nevada corporation with its administrative office based in Cape Town, South Africa.

== History and description ==
South African inventor Dr. Christopher Leatt filed his first neck-brace-related patent in 2003.

The Leatt-Brace is designed to work only when worn in conjunction with the full-face helmets typically used in the aforementioned activities. The brace uses what the inventor calls Alternative Load Path Technology to help absorb and disperse injury-producing forces. The brace is designed to limit hyperflexion, hyperextension, lateral hyperflexion and posterior hypertranslation, which are extreme forward, backward, sideways, and rearward movement of the head on the neck. Although the brace cannot protect against pure axial compression of the spine, it is designed to help minimize such loading, when coupled with one of the extreme movements above.

In 2009, the Leatt-Brace received C/E approval, which is granted by European Union law. Gaining CE approval for Personal Protective Equipment (PPE) includes adhering to basic health and safety requirements as well as performance requirements. The Leatt-Brace was approved based on a review of the concept, design, operation and testing of the brace, and chemical analysis of brace components.
