= Steve Cook (cyclist) =

American mountain bike racer

Cycling career
- Sport: Cycling
- Discipline: Mountain bike racing
- Role: Rider

Steve Cook is an American former professional mountain bike racer, from Durango, Colorado. He was an inaugural inductee into the Mountain Bike Hall of Fame, in 1988.

Cook raced from 1980 to 1988, and his first major event was the NORBA Nationals in 1984, at which he took second place. He also rode his custom mountain bike in cyclo-cross races (in which narrow-tired road cycles are more commonly used), and even took a state championship in that discipline.

After retiring from racing, Cook became the operator of a mountain bike rental shop in Crested Butte, Colorado, where he is also well known for trailblazing, credited with the establishment of the "Single-track" trail network in the area's National Forest.
