= Bicycle collecting =

Collection of antique or other bicycles

As with many consumer products, early bicycles were purchased solely for their usefulness or fashionableness and discarded as they wore out or were replaced by newer models. Some items were thrown into storage and survived, but many others went to the scrapyard. Decades later, those with an interest in cycling and history began to seek out older bikes, collecting different varieties. Like other forms of collecting, bike collectors can be completists or specialists, and many have extensive holdings in bike parts or literature, in addition to complete bicycles.

== North America ==
Due to the tremendous number of bicycle manufacturers and models that have appeared over the past 150 years, most collectors specialize in a particular style or period of bicycles. Currently, there are three primary periods of particular collector interest in North America, although many collectors will further specialize in the products of a single manufacturer or even examples of a single model within a given period. The major periods are:

- High Wheel and Antique (Early 19th century-1933)—Early bicycles were all experiments and came in a dizzying variety of shapes. From primitive "hobby horses" to the giant high wheel or penny-farthing bicycles of the 1880s, collectors have gathered and studied these strange designs. Although many of these models are extremely rare, their peculiar shapes are fascinating and offer insight into the development of mechanical solutions that eventually resulted in the fairly standardized "safety bicycle" of the 1890s. Also included in this category are the early safety bicycles, which featured wooden rim wheels, skinny tires, and slightly larger wheel diameter than what became standard later.
- Balloon Tire Classics (1933–1965)—This period is dominated by the cruiser style bicycles of Schwinn and other manufacturers. These bikes featured wide balloon tires and heavy frames, for improved durability. The children’s market was a focus during this era, leading to elaborate streamline styling and loads of accessories: lights, speedometers, springer (suspension) forks, horns, luggage racks, and more. These bikes were neglected and abused until the mid 1970s when Leon Dixon began penning a series of articles for magazines such as Popular Mechanics and organized the earliest collector swap meets. Soon prices of old cruisers began to rise. Today, this is probably the most popular area of bike collecting.
- Wheelie bikes and Early BMX (1965–1980)—This fast-growing segment of the hobby in North America focuses on the Schwinn Sting-Rays, Raleigh Choppers and other banana seat bikes of the 1960s and the early BMX models that grew out of them. The Sting-Rays offered a huge assortment of accessories, much like the old cruisers, but over this period the bikes were stripped down and made stronger and stronger to withstand the rigors of dirt track racing and trick riding. Prices in this category have begun to rise recently as the children of the 1960s reach the age where they have the money, the time, and the inclination to collect.

== See also ==
- History of the bicycle
- Schwinn Bicycle Company
- Cruiser bicycle
- BMX
- Collecting
- Bicycle
