= Mountain Bike Hall of Fame =

Award for mountain biking

The Mountain Bike Hall of Fame (MBHOF) was founded in 1988 to chronicle the history of mountain biking. Formerly located in Crested Butte, Colorado, it relocated to Fairfax, California in 2014 and became part of the Marin Museum of Bicycling.

Since the creation of this sport in the 1970s, mountain biking has grown to be immensely popular worldwide and the MBHOF works to document individuals and events which have significantly contributed to mountain biking history. The museum houses items of memorabilia, vintage bikes and components, classic photos, press clippings, and highlights from historic races and events. As of 2016, the MBHOF has inducted more than 140 individuals and groups who have made major contributions to mountain biking.

== Inductees ==
1988	Joe Breeze; Steve Cook; Charlie Cunningham; Gary Fisher; Charlie Kelly; Murdoch; Joe Murray; Jacquie Phelan; Tom Ritchey; Mike Sinyard	1989	Don Cook; Wende Cragg; Erick Koski; Jeff Lindsay; Steve Potts; Victor Vincente of America	1990	Chris Chance; Ned Overend; Tom Hillard; Scot Nicol; Glen Odell; Cindy Whitehead
1991	John Tomac; Carole Bauer; Craig and Gary Cook; Chuck Elliot; Al Farrell; Naomi Friedberg Tri-Ath; Mike Rust; Ross Shafer	1992	Gary Klein; Tom Mayer; Mark Slate; Fred Wolf; Sara Ballantyne; Don Douglass; Ed Zink	1993	Alan Armstrong; Jimmy Deaton; Juli Furtado; Otis Guy; Gary Helfrich
1994	Keith Bontrager; Douglas Bradbury; Bill Cockroft; Ignaz & Frank Schwinn	1995	Richard Cunningham; Kay Peterson-Cook; Steve Ready	1996	Kent Eriksen; Greg Herbold; Marilyn Price; Shivam Patel; Youcef Bendiff; The Cupertino Riders
1997	Robert LaRosa; Susan DeMattei; Mert Lawwill; John Parker	1998	Dean Crandall; Jim Hasenauer; Max Jones	1999	Thomas Frischknecht; Tim Gould; Sam Morris (BV); Mtn. Bike Club Discovery; Paola Pezzo; Hans Rey; Regina Stiefl; Velo Cross Club Parisien (VCCP)
2000	Linda DuPriest; Keizo Shimano; John Stamstad; Steve Tilford; Dave Wiens	2001	David Tinker Juarez; Tim Blumenthal; Steve Boehmke; Denise Caramagno; Richard Long	2002	Jacob Heilbron; Michael Kelley; Mike Kloser; Laird Knight; Brian Skinner; Elaine & Maurice Tierney (founders of Dirt Rag)
2003	Gary Crandall; Cindy Devine; Dan Koeppel; Ashley Korenblat	2004	Matt Hebberd; Kurt Loheit; Pat Follet and Tom Spiegel; Paul Thomasberg	2005	Tom Moran; Gary Sprung; The British Columbians; Paul Brodie (Brodie Bicycles)
2006	Travis Brown; Robert Gregorio; Chris King; Dave Stopera; Eric Latendresse; Jake Kubasta	2007	Hill Abell; Sal Ruibal; Alison Sydor; Frank Wadelton	2008	Steve Blick; John Finley Scott; Bob Girvin; Philip Keyes; Brian Lopes; Nat Ross
2009	Anne-Caroline Chausson; Colorado Plateau Mountain Bike Trail Association (COPMOBA); Dave Garoutte; Larkspur Canyon Gang	2010	Jim Wannamaker; John Ker; Alan Bonds; ‘Fro Riders’	2011	Pete Webber; The Laguna Rads; Patrice Drouin & Chantal Lachance; Bob Allen
2012	Bob Woodward; Monte Ward; Gary Sjoquist; Ruthie Matthes; Dave House	2013	Nicolas Vouilloz; Marla Streb; Robin & Bill Groff; David Epperson; Concerned Off Road Bicyclists Association-CORBA	2014	Jenn Dice; The Koski Family's Cove Bike Shop; Jimmy "Mac" McIlvain; Leigh Donovan
2015	Glen Jacobs; Horst Leitner; Stevie Smith; North Shore Trail Builders; Uli Stanciu	2016	Jeff Archer; Hank Barlow; Matt Fritzinger; Missy Giove; Román Urbina	2017	Giovanna Bonazzi; Brent Foes; Mark Norstad; Wolfgang Renner
2018	Josh Bender; Ken Chlouber; Greg Minaar; Kennett Brothers; Steve Peat	2019	Tim Neenan; Myles Rockwell; Rebecca Rusch; Derek Westerlund	2020	Julien Absalon; Dafydd Davis; Stan Koziatek; Tym Manley & Steve Behr; Jason McRoy
2021	Rachel Atherton; Darren Berrecloth; Radek Burkat; Dave Cullinan; Dave Kelly & Rob McSkimming	2022	Jim Busby; Ot Pi Isern; Tarek Rasouli; Gunn-Rita Dahle Flesjå	2023	Shaun Palmer; Diddie Schneider; Rob Warner

== See also ==
- Mountain biking
- History of the mountain bike and mountain biking
- Hall of fame
- United States Bicycling Hall of Fame
- Bicycle Museum
- List of bicycle and human powered vehicle museums
