= Brodie Bicycles =

Bicycle manufacturer

- Founded: 1986
- Founder: Paul Brodie
- Headquarters: Vancouver, British Columbia, Canada
- Area served: Worldwide
- Products: Bicycles
- Website: brodiebikes.com

Brodie Bicycles is a manufacturer of mountain, road, cyclocross and commuter bicycles based in Burnaby, British Columbia, Canada.

== History ==
Paul Brodie started Brodie Research and Technology in 1986, after leaving his frame building position with Rocky Mountain Bicycles, manufacturing custom steel hardtail mountain bikes. As the designer and builder of the first Vancouver trademark sloping-top-tube, he took the design on to develop what would become the modern mountain bike. Early frames were the catalyst, climbMax, Sovereign, eXpresso and Romax.

CyberSport Ltd. assumed the worldwide distribution of Brodie bicycles in 1994. At that point, five production models were offered as complete bikes; the 2013 lineup included 36 complete bicycles and five titanium frames. Production of aluminum models started appearing in 1998 and in 1999 the Holeshot was redesigned. The Holeshot launched as one of the first free-ride hardtails; hydraulic disc brakes, heavy-duty wheels with big tires and a long-travel fork.

An article in Singletrack World, a cycling publication, describes Brodie thusly: ″With Vancouver as their playground they had the opportunity to hone their bikes for some of the toughest trails in the world, producing some of the most forward-thinking hardtail designs that have spawned many classic bikes over the years. The long sloping top tube and slack HA were what made the Brodie frames so good in tough and technical terrain and are now pretty much standard on long travel hard tail frames.″

Frame selection and geometry for Brodie Bikes is currently handled by Bruce Spicer, 13-time Canadian National Championship title holder in road, mountain bike and track.

Brodie is a small bicycle company with approximately seven full-time staff members.

Paul Brodie eventually sold his company to their longtime distributor CyberSport Ltd. in 2001.

== Awards ==
On September 29, 2005, Paul Brodie was inducted into the Mountain Bike Hall of Fame at Interbike in Las Vegas, creating an international fan base for the Vancouver brand.

Brodie continues to influence the bicycle industry with handbuilt projects, such as those featured at the North American Handmade Bicycle Show. His 1888 Whippet reproduction won the People's Choice category at the 2012 NAHBS.
