= Trips for Kids =

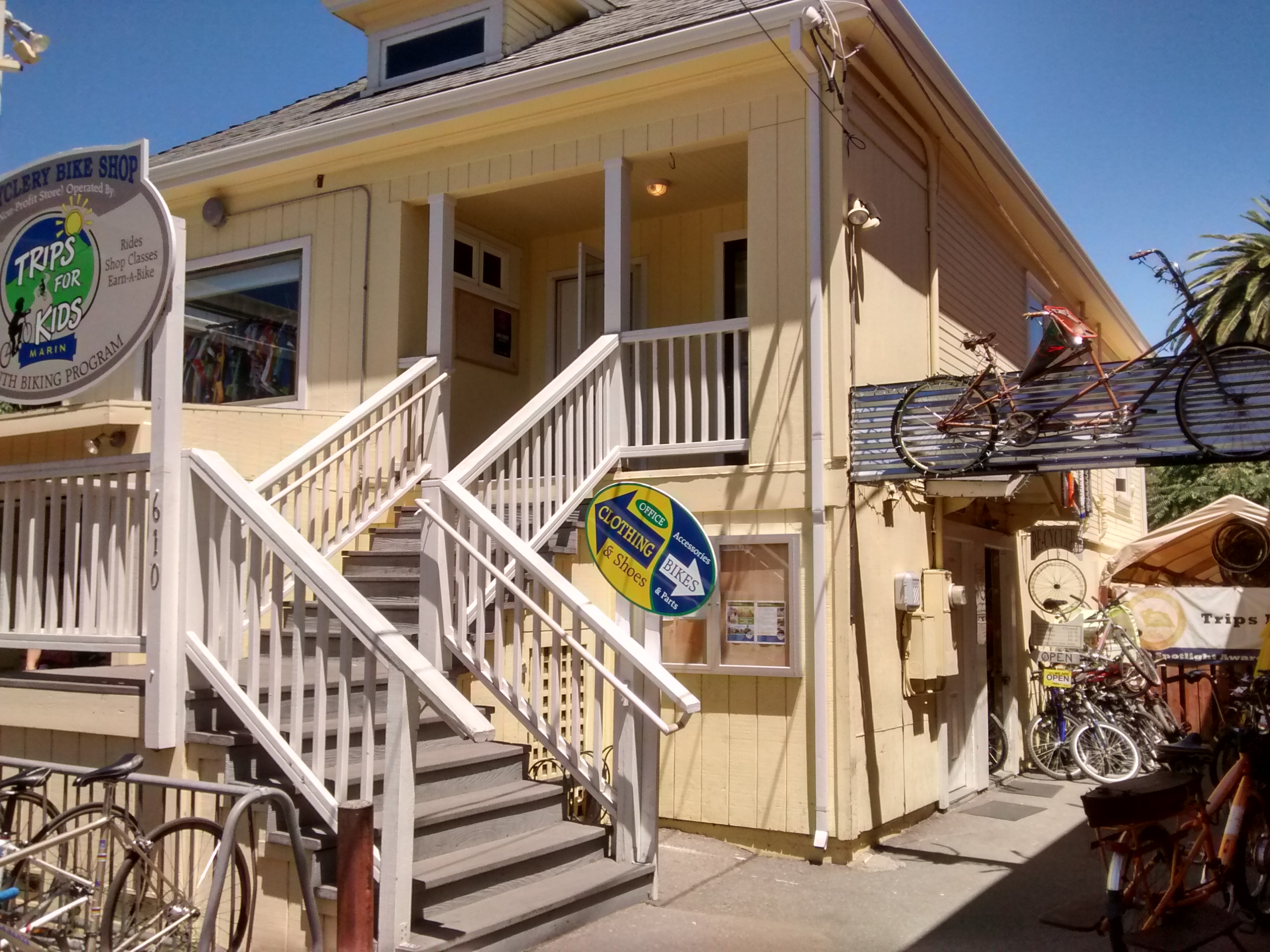

Trips For Kids is a non-profit community service organization that provides beginner and intermediate-level mountain bike riding, environmental education, bicycle mechanics training and earn-a-bike programs for youth in the United States and Canada. Legally based in Marin County, California, over 230,000 children have been served by 75 Trips for Kids chapters in the United States and Canada as of December 2017.

== History ==
Trips for Kids was founded in Marin County, California in 1988 by Marilyn Price, a social activist, environmentalist and Mountain Bike Hall of Fame inductee. Price used the mountain bike to teach youth lessons in personal responsibility, achievement and environmental awareness through the development of practical skills. Price formed the nonprofit Trips for Kids-Marin, the organization's flagship program, and began national outreach in the mid-1990s to inspire new chapters. Independent chapters began to form throughout the United States, Canada, Israel and briefly in Sierra Leone, growing to 75 chapters as of August 2017.

== Programs and chapters ==
In addition to the Discovery Trail Rides Program, Trips for Kids chapters also run Adventure Ride Clubs, Earn-a-Bike Workshops, Mobile Bike Clinics, camps, and other programs. Five chapters also operate recycled community bike thrift shops.

== Expansion to National Umbrella Organization ==
On August 1, 2017, Trips For Kids expanded into a 501c3 national umbrella organization was established to provide support for Trips for Kids chapters, build new chapters, improve program quality, and promote the organization.

== National Board of Directors ==
Patricia Gallery, President

Jason Davis, Treasurer

Chris Degenaars, Secretary
