= Mike Sinyard =

American businessman

Mike Sinyard is the founder and chair man of Specialized Bicycle Components, an American manufacturer of bicycles and cycling components. In 2022, he retired as the CEO of Specialized Bicycle Components, a company he had led for 48 years.

== Early career ==
Specialized Bicycle Components was founded by Mike Sinyard in 1974, when he was 24 years old. Sinyard had previously traveled to Europe and established an import business relationship with Cinelli, one of the most important and iconic Italian bike component manufacturer. He started Specialized by importing and assembling bikes from Italian components and also ran an import service that provided these sought-after parts to California bike shops. Within four years, the company was making approximately $18 million and began selling complete bikes. In 1981, Sinyard created the Specialized Stumpjumper, the first mass-produced mountain bike. He moved the firm to Morgan Hill, CA in 1984.

He was profiled in the 2007 documentary film Klunkerz: A Film About Mountain Bikes.

== Awards and recognition ==
Sinyard is a founding member of the International Mountain Bicycling Association (IMBA) and the National Interscholastic Cycling Association (NICA). The Specialized Stumpjumper was added to the Smithsonian National Museum of American History's collection in 1994. He has been recognized for his contributions to the cycling industry, including being inducted into the Mountain Bike Hall of Fame in 1988 and the U.S. Bicycling Hall of Fame in 2011.
