= Tom Ritchey =

American bicycle frame builder (born 1956)

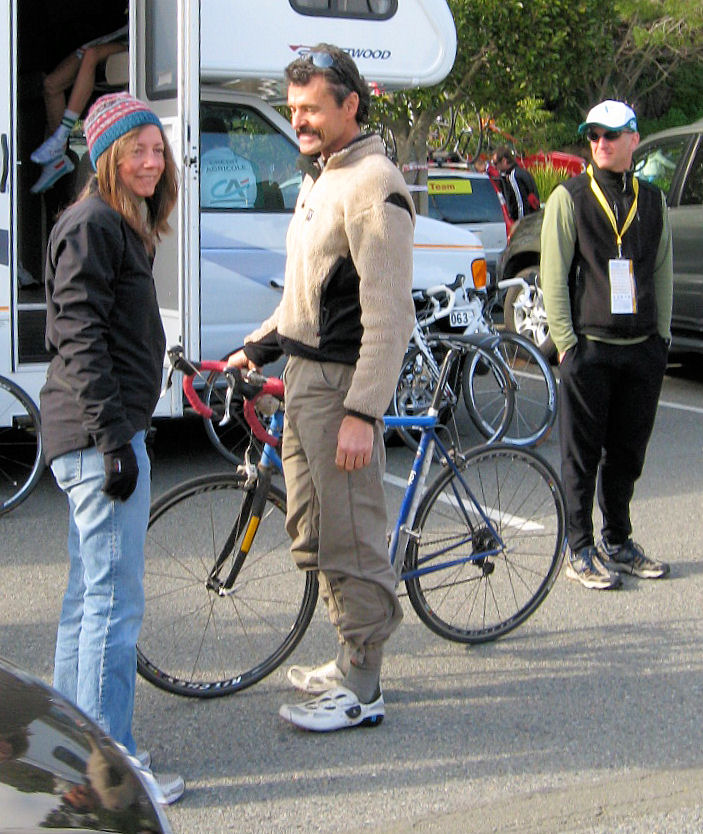
Tom Ritchey being interviewed on The Fredcast

Tom Ritchey (born 1956) is an American bicycle frame builder, Category 1 racer, fabricator, designer, and founder of Ritchey Design. Ritchey is a US pioneer in modern frame building and the first production mountain bike builder/manufacturer in the history of the sport. He is an innovator of bicycle components that have been used in winning some of the biggest cycling competitions in the world including the UCI World Championships, the Tour de France and the Olympics. In 1988, Ritchey was inducted into the inaugural Mountain Bike Hall of Fame in Crested Butte, Colorado (now located in Fairfax, California): and 2012, inducted to the United States Bicycle Hall of Fame in Davis, California.

== Early years ==
Tom Ritchey moved to Menlo Park, California, from Cherry Hill, New Jersey, in 1963, when his father was hired as an engineer at Ampex Corporation, an electronics company located in Redwood City, California, pioneered the magnetic tape recorder. Ritchey attributes his interest in bicycles to his father's interest in cycling, as his father found cycling as a means to get to work and fell in love with the sport himself.

At age 11, Ritchey's father taught Tom Jr. to build his wheels and repair tubular tires. Ritchey started a small business repairing tires to earn money to buy his first road bike, a Raleigh Super Course. When he was 14, Ritchey joined the Belmont Bicycle Club (BBC) and began racing. Shortly after this, he upgraded his bike to a frame he repaired himself, a broken Cinelli "B." His father taught him how to braze around this time, and he started repairing bicycle frames for local racers.

After learning to repair other builders' damaged tubes, Ritchey built his first racing frame. He decided to build his frame out of a necessity for an affordable, lighter, faster bike. He bought the tube set and lugs from local builder Hugh Enox at the time for $21, and in 1972 built his first frame, which he raced on that year. He won many junior races and titles on this very frame, and eventually, on future bikes he built, he won the Senior Prestige Road trophy and the BAR (Best All-Around Rider) in 1973 and 1974 as a Junior. These feats led to Ritchey being known as the "Senior Slayer", having beaten top Californians (many of whom considered to be some of the best riders in the U.S. at the time) and former Olympians.

Tom rode for Team USA's Junior Worlds road racing squad, and then a stint on the U.S. National Road Team. In 1976, Ritchey retired from road racing. He continued to race mountain bikes through the early 1980s, competing more recently in races like the Downieville Classic, La Ruta, Trans Andes, Trans Alps and Cape Epic in South Africa.

During his early racing years, Ritchey began building bikes for Palo Alto Bicycles and its national mail order catalog. In 1974, as his senior year in high school approached, Ritchey had already built approximately 200 frames. It was around this time he honed his fillet brazing or "lugless" method of fabricating frames. Ritchey sought to challenge bicycle industry standards of frame tubing diameter at the time limited by the use of fixed dimensioned lugs. Ritchey's fillet brazing construction method allowed the choice of larger thin-wall tubing diameters and unique ovalizations to create lighter -stiffer frames. By 1979, Ritchey had produced over 1,000 frames on his own.

== Off-road riding and the mountain bike ==
Ritchey often cites his friend, the late Jobst Brandt as being crucial not only to his development as a cyclist and component designer, but for his deep passion in off-road riding. Brandt, author of the iconic book, The Bicycle Wheel, had a riding style that was unlike anyone else at the time. Brandt would lead his infamous rides that quickly left the paved roads behind and ventured onto to dirt single-track trails on traditional road bikes with no modification—something completely unheard in the 1960s and '70s.

In 1978, Ritchey was approached by Joe Breeze and Otis Guy to build a tandem for them to use in a record attempt across America. Breeze brought his newly made off-road "ballooner" bike to Ritchey's shop in Menlo Park.

While he credits Joe Breeze for building the first custom off-road specific 26" wheeled frame, however, known only to a few people, Ritchey had already built an off-road specific 650b bike along the design lines of a fatter tired, flat barred "woodsy/cow trail" bike. Ritchey says he was influenced by the late John Finley Scott, who encouraged him to build a bike for years with 650b wheels and tires.

Upon seeing Joe's bike, he said, "I think I’ll build something like that also." Breeze returned to his home of Fairfax, CA and told Gary Fisher of Ritchey's intentions to build a 26" "ballooner." Immediately, Fisher called Ritchey and asked Ritchey to build him one as well. Because of Ritchey's production mindset, he built a third frame. When Fisher picked up his frame a few months later and learned of the third frame, he told Ritchey, "I can sell that." The seeds of the new "mountain bike" company were sown, beginning with Fisher selling bike #3 to a fellow Marin resident.

These "ballooners" were first featured in BMX Plus magazine, before the world identified them as a mountain bike, and a new buzz surrounded this new style of off-road bike.

Fisher enlisted the help of his friend and roommate, Charlie Kelly, to market and sell the bikes Ritchey was building. Because Ritchey had years of custom frame and component manufacturing experience, he was uniquely suited to tackle and establish many of the new designs and standards this new breed of bicycle would require. The company initially was called Ritchey MountainBikes, with Ritchey fillet brazing over 1000 bikes over the course of those beginning three years. This high volume of production lead to Ritchey becoming mountain biking's first production frame builder, earning him the moniker, "The General Motors of mountain bike frame companies," from Mike Sinyard of Specialized. The informal business lasted about three years, with Ritchey building the bikes in the mountains of the south bay peninsula while Fisher and Kelly sold them out of Fairfax and Marin.

In 1983, Ritchey left the relationship. Kelly also left for personal reasons. On his own, Ritchey sold his remaining frames to a new company out of British Columbia, called Rocky Mountain Bicycles. Out of this turbulent time Ritchey built his own sales and marketing company, hired a retired professional road racer, Mike Neel, as his salesman and created Ritchey Design.

By the early 80s general interest in cycling was in decline, however, mountain biking was growing. Events like Pearl Pass and the NORBA '83 National Championships drove interest in the emerging sport. By the mid 1980s, over 25 percent of the bike industry was based on mountain bikes, with Ritchey emerging as the #1 off-road component design company outside of Shimano.

== Project Rwanda ==
In December 2005, Ritchey toured Rwanda by bicycle. He found the landscape to be beautiful, but the people and their journey of reconciliation were even more compelling.

Ritchey rode through the hilly countryside, (Rwanda is called Land of a Thousand Hills) and witnessed the incredible cycling talent that existed there, without any of the modern cycling technology available to the average cyclist here in the USA. Ritchey believed that a national cycling team could bring a sense of hope and national pride. Within the next few months, Ritchey began to formalize a 501c3 nonprofit organization called, Project Rwanda. Ritchey then asked his friend, Jared Miller, if he would go to Rwanda to explore the possibility of putting on a cycling event.

On September 16, 2006, Ritchey sponsored the first annual Rwandan Wooden Bike Classic in Karongi Stadium: a mountain bike, wooden bike, and single speed colonial bike race. Attendance was over 3,000.

Ritchey asked North American Tour de France Stage winner, Alex Stieda, and cycling pioneer, Jock Boyer, to race alongside him at the event held to celebrate the wooden bike innovation and what it meant to Ritchey. After the event, Ritchey asked Boyer to help him in finding and cultivating cycling talent, which would become Team Rwanda.

Ritchey designed a geared cargo/coffee bike, capable of carrying heavy loads, to help the Rwandans, especially the coffee farmers in the rural areas of Rwanda, get their crops more efficiently to washing stations. He worked with other NGO's like World Vision and Bikes for Rwanda, to help distribute approximately 4,000 bikes, through micro finance programs and grants.

== Innovations ==
Again, Jobst Brandt was crucial to the young and aspiring Ritchey, and the products he was designing. Brandt, a mechanical engineer at Hewlett-Packard, always called into question Tom's new ideas—scrutinizing every detail of his designs. Ritchey, who sought to design and produce components that were light and fast, was often countered by Brandt who demanded components be durable and strong enough to endure the back country epic rides Jobst liked to do. Ritchey's foundational design principles emerged from these dueling philosophies.

Among the first of Ritchey's designs to be brought to use was his "Logic" steel frame tubing. With the new era of fillet brazing he pioneered, and the new uprising of TIG welded frame production, Ritchey knew that condensed, force-direction butted tubing would produce steel frames that would be lighter and stronger than common butted tubes previously manufactured. Initially Ritchey sought tubes from Italian company Columbus; however, they didn't meet Ritchey's specifications, so Tange of Japan was the final supplier. Their success lead to the birth of Logic Tubing. This tubing changed the way tubing manufacturers thought about butting profiles, allowing the manufacture of lighter, yet extremely durable larger diameter steel tubing bikes. He later took his same shortened butt concept to spoke manufacturer DT Swiss to produce spokes to build lighter, stronger wheels.

Below is a list of a few innovations and firsts Ritchey produced:

- 1974 - Twin-plated crown forks
- 1979 - New "MountainBikes" frame
- 1980 - 130mm mountain bike specific rear hub
- 1980 - 120mm bottom bracket spindle to account for wider chain stays that accommodate a wider rear tire
- 1980 - The Bullmoose integrated mountain bike specific handlebar and stem
- 1983 - Standard unicrown tapered fork
- 1984 - Logic butted tubing
- 1984 - Developed new MTB specific tread design with IRC, Japan. Applied road tire technology to MTB tires, introducing a folding bead and 120tpi. In 1988, applied vector force analysis (VFA) tread designs to develop mountain bike tires featuring front & rear specific and rotation direction tires.
- 1985 - Vantage rim, the first welded mountain bike specific rim produced by Ukai; a wider, 25mm rim developed to better handle a wider knobby tire
- 1989 - Logic Condensed double butted spokes produced by DT Swiss
- 1989 - Developed alloy 3D net shape forging, for stems that led the way to a new generation of lighter, stiffer and stronger stems that did away with welding.
- 1992 - First to succeed in off center rim (OCR) technology which made possible a balanced spoke tension in rear wheels and off center disc specific front and rear wheels.
- 1995 - 2x9 speed drivetrain for mountain bikes

== Personal life ==
Ritchey is married to his second wife, Martha. Together they have six children; son Jay, and daughters Sara and Annie (Tom), and sons Steven, David, and Christopher (Martha). Tom and Martha have six grandchildren.

== Film ==
- Tom Ritchey was profiled in the 2006 documentary film Klunkerz: A Film About Mountain Bikes.
- "Tom Ritchey's 40 Year Ride," a documentary was released in August 2012 chronicling four decades of Ritchey's business
- "Rising from Ashes," a 2012 documentary film chronicling the beginning of Team Rwanda

== Accolades, awards, and influence ==
- 1988, inducted into the Mountain Bike Hall of Fame
- 2012, inducted into the United States Bicycling Hall of Fame

Ritchey has influenced many frame builders. The legendary frame builder and fabricator Paul Brodie has cited Tom Ritchey as one of his first influences:

Paul Brodie said in an article for thespoken.cc "However, two weeks later a red Ritchey Team Comp with matching red Bullmoose Bars showed up and totally blew me away. I had never seen anything like it, and couldn’t believe anyone could make a bike that beautiful. I had little money, so I decided to make my own…"
