= Charlie Kelly (mountain biker) =

American mountain bike pioneer

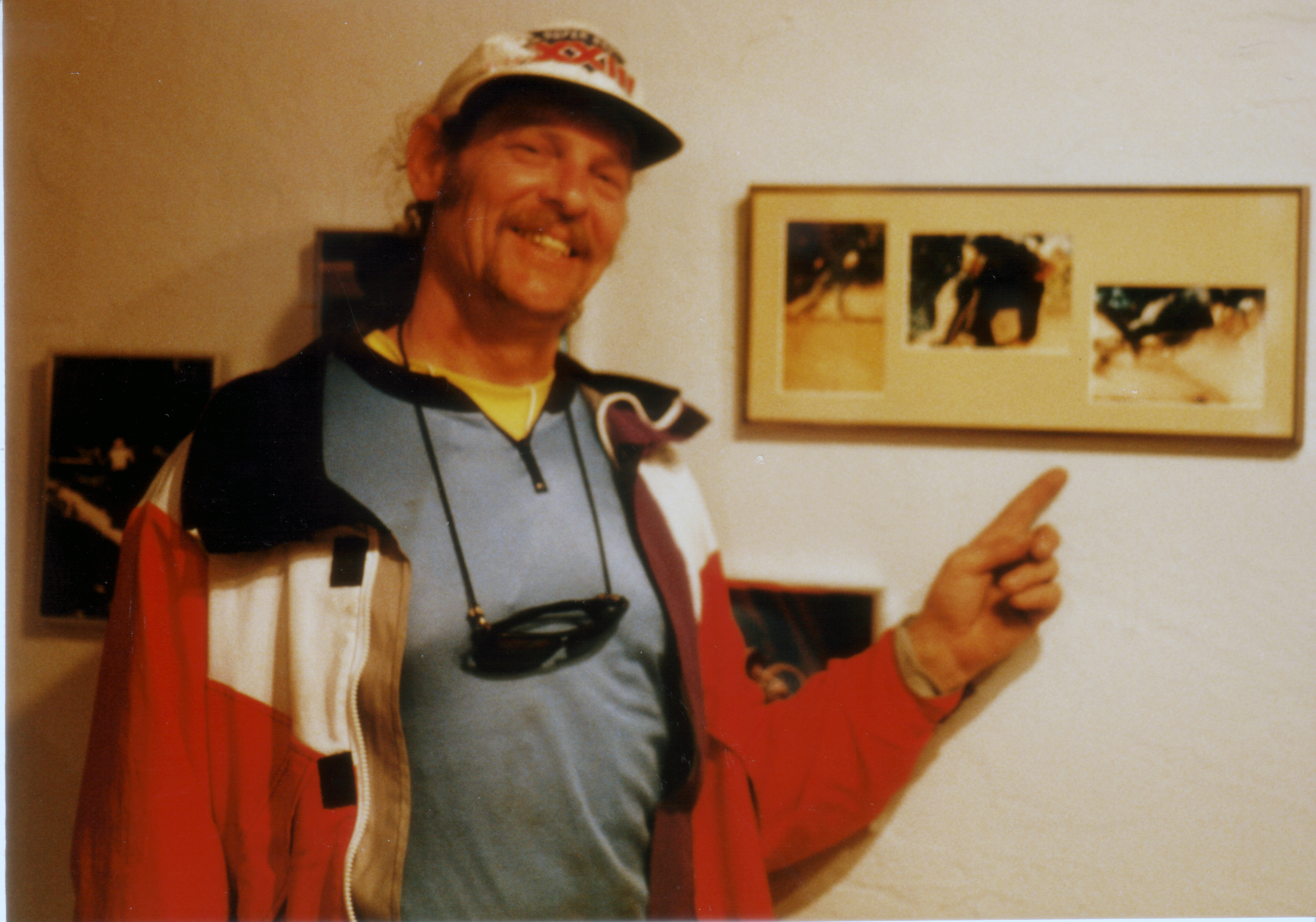
- Kelly at the Mountain Bike Hall of Fame, 1989
- Born: 1945 (age 80–81)
- Occupation: Businessman

Charles Richard Kelly (born 1945) is a mountain bike pioneer whose writing, advocacy, and entrepreneurship shaped the sport. Along with Marin County local Fred Wolfe, Kelly founded Repack, the first downhill time-trial race, on October 21, 1976, in Fairfax, California. Kelly then partnered with his then-roommate Gary Fisher and Bay Area framebuilder Tom Ritchey to found the first bike shop specifically for mountain bikes. Kelly was inducted into the Mountain Bike Hall of Fame in 1988.

== Life ==
Kelly attended Tamalpais High School in Mill Valley, California, at the foot of Mount Tamalpais.

During the late sixties and early seventies Kelly was a roadie for a San Francisco rock band, the Sons of Champlin. When the band broke up in 1977, Kelly turned his attention to his passion for bicycling and "klunker" bikes he and his friends were constructing from old frames and taking off-road.

In 1972 Kelly was a founding member and later president of Velo-Club Tamalpais, a bicycle club whose membership included most of the early Marin County mountain bike pioneers. In 1976 he started promoting the Repack downhill race, the first great mountain bike event. In connection with his downhill racing efforts, he commissioned custom off-road bicycle frames from builders Craig Mitchell and Joe Breeze. These were among the first "mountain bikes" ever built.

In 1979 Kelly joined his former roommate Gary Fisher and framebuilder Tom Ritchey in a business venture called MountainBikes, the first place in the world people could buy a complete mountain bicycle, rather than putting it together themselves. This is not to be confused with the company Specialized, who in 1981 sold the first production mountain bike, that could be bought in a bike shop and rolled away that same day. In 1982 Kelly sold his interest in the company to Fisher, who renamed it Fisher Mountain Bikes. Also in 1979, Kelly began contributing articles to bicycle publications on the new and growing sport of mountain biking.

In 1980 Kelly and Denise Caramagno started the first mountain bike magazine, The Fat Tire Flyer. Until 1986 this was the only publication for mountain bikers. In 1983 Kelly participated in the founding of the National Off-Road Bicycle Association, the first sanctioning body for mountain bike racing, and in collaboration with Tom Hillard, wrote the first set of rules for off-road bicycle racing.

Kelly is the author of a definitive history of the sport of mountain biking, Fat Tire Flyer: Repack and the Birth of Mountain Biking.

He was inducted into the Mountain Bike Hall of Fame in 1988.

== See also ==
- Mountain Bike Hall of Fame
- Gary Fisher
- Joe Breeze
- Tom Ritchey
- Mountain bike

=== Film ===
- Charlie Kelly appeared in Full Cycle: A World Odyssey an around-the-world two-hour mountain-bike travel documentary produced by New & Unique Videos of San Diego in 1994.
- Charlie Kelly was profiled in the 2007 documentary film Klunkerz: A Film About Mountain Bikes.
