= Dirt Rag =

American mountain bike magazine

- Former editors: Josh Patterson, Mike Cushionbury, Eric McKeegan, Karen Brooks, Michael Browne, Elaine Tierney, Carolyne Whelan
- Categories: Sports and Outdoors
- Frequency: 4 issues per year
- Circulation: 35,000
- Publisher: Maurice Tierney
- Founder: Maurice Tierney, Elaine Tierney
- Founded: 1989
- Final issue: January 2020
- Country: USA
- Based in: Pittsburgh
- Language: English
- ISSN: 1082-6785

Dirt Rag was a mountain bike magazine based out of Pittsburgh, Pennsylvania. The magazine covered many aspects of mountain-bike culture. It was in circulation between 1989 and January 2020.

Dirt Rag's old logo

== Unique features ==
Founded in 1989, Dirt Rag was an independently owned mountain bike magazine that enjoyed worldwide distribution. The magazine focused on mountain bikes and their riders, but it also embraced all aspects of bicycle culture. The magazine was known for thorough and honest product reviews, a unique perspective on cycling, and original bicycle-related literature and art.

The Dirt Rag Issue #19 Cover

Dirt Rag celebrated a grassroots connection to its readers and coverage of neglected niches of the bicycle world.

== Publishing facts ==
- Dirt Rag was originally published seven times per year, but was reduced to four issues in its final year of publication.
- In 2012, Dirt Rag founded a new parent company, Rotating Mass Media, to oversee the Dirt Rag brand and the Dirt Fest mountain bike festivals.
- Founders Maurice and Elaine Tierney were elected to the Mountain Bike Hall of Fame in 2002.
- On January 30, 2020, Dirt Rag announced they would be "shutting its doors and ceasing all operations, including the website and Dirt Fest."
