= Gary Fisher =

Cyclist and bike designer (born 1950)

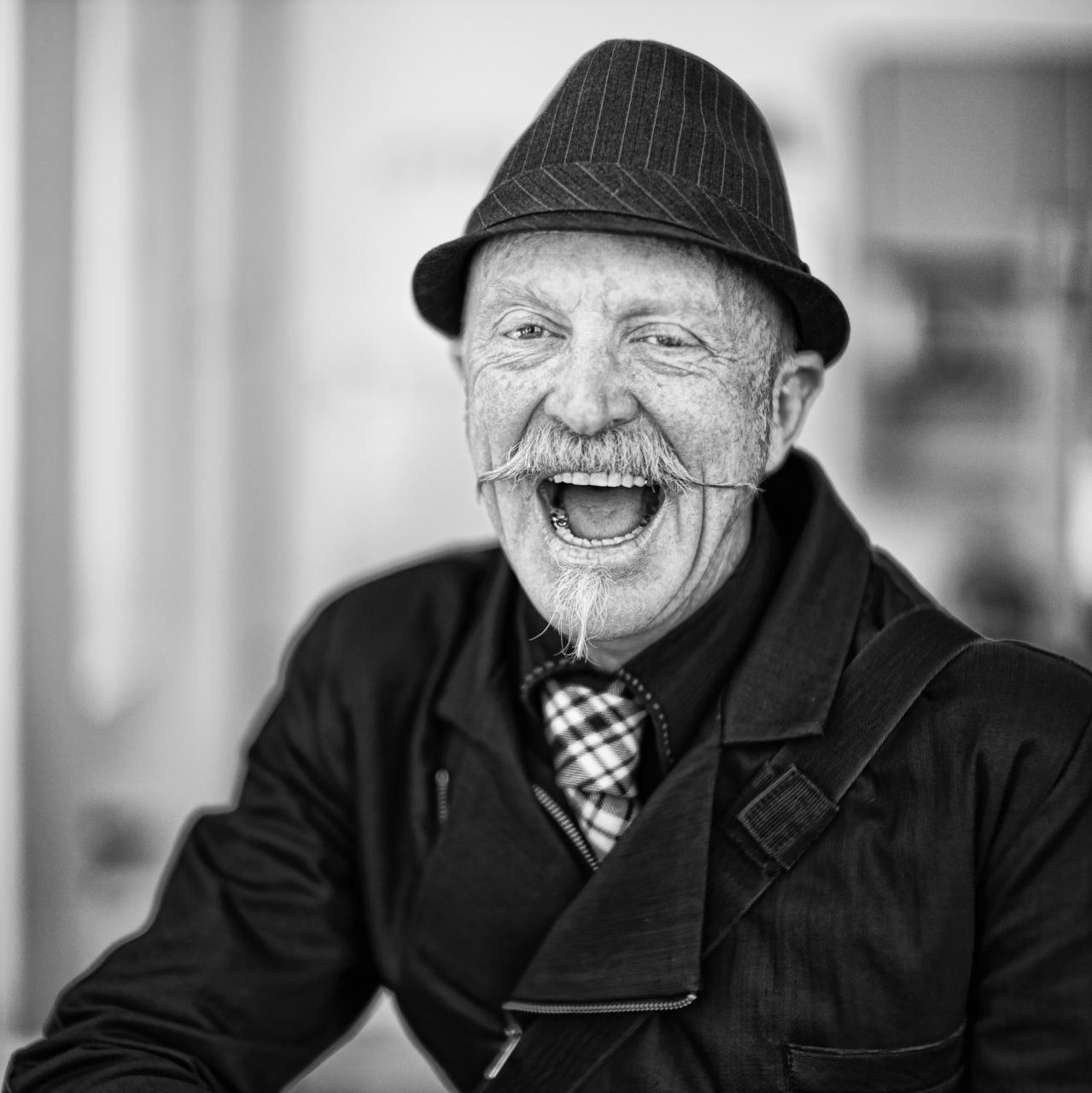
Gary Fisher in 2011

Gary Christopher Fisher (born November 5, 1950) is considered one of the inventors of the modern mountain bike.

Fisher started competing in road and track races at age 12. He was suspended in 1968 because race organizers cited a rule that his hair was too long. By 1972 this rule had been repealed and Fisher's career continued. He won the TransAlp race in Europe and a Masters XC national title.

In 1974 Fisher got to work modifying his 1930s Schwinn Excelsior X Bicycle. His innovations to the model included drum brakes, motorcycle brake levers and cables, and triple chainrings, all taken from "junkers" Fisher found at bike shops. The next year, Fisher participated in the Repack downhill race, promoted by his roommate Charlie Kelly. This used a torturous downhill route on Pine Mountain near Fairfax, California, just north of San Francisco, in which riders used their coaster brakes so much that they had to repack the smoking hubs with grease after every run. Fisher holds the record time on the Repack course at 4:22.

Gary Fisher speaks about his role as a pioneer in the sport of mountain biking in two video documentaries: Full Cycle: A World Odyssey (1994) and Klunkerz (2007). Original clips of Fisher on his mountain bike appear in both documentaries.

== Company ==
Gary Fisher coined the term mountain bike in 1979. That year, Fisher and Kelly founded MountainBikes, the first company to specialize in the manufacture of this type of bicycle. Frames were built by Tom Ritchey, who later founded his own company. The first model sold for $1,300; 160 were manufactured in the first year.

1979 saw the introduction of Shimano components and an ill-fated attempt to trademark Mountain Bike. The company dissolved in 1983; Fisher founded Gary Fisher Mountain Bikes the same year. Fisher sold his company in 1991 to Taiwan's Anlen company, staying on as President. Fisher developed the first commercially produced full suspension bicycles designed by Mert Lawwill, a former champion motorcycle racer. His bike, the Gary Fisher RS-1, was released in 1992. Its rear suspension adapted the A-arm suspension design from sports car racing, and was the first four-bar linkage in mountain biking. In 1992, Howie Cohen, who had previously imported Nishiki, Azuki and Kuwahara bicycles, assisted Gary Fisher with his brand, 18 months later brokering the acquisition of Fisher by Trek Bicycle Corporation.

On June 16, 2010, Trek Bicycle Corporation announced "the Gary Fisher Collection, a line of Trek bikes that will replace the standalone Gary Fisher brand".

== After company sale ==
Fisher remains involved with design and marketing, along with being scout and mentor to racers sponsored by the team. The best known was the gold-medal winner in the 1996 and 2000 Olympics women's mountain biking: Paola Pezzo.

== Awards ==
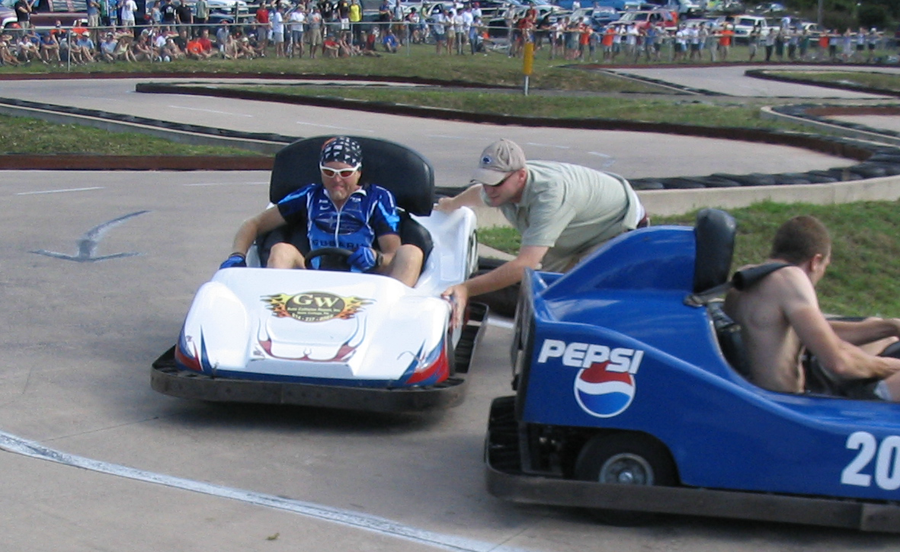
Gary Fisher in the Go-Kart portion of the 2005 SSWC

Fisher was inducted into the Mountain Bike Hall of Fame in 1988.

Outside magazine named him one of the "50 who left their mark" in the sport in 2000.

Smithsonian magazine honored him in 1994 as the "Founding Father of Mountain Bikes."

In 1998, Fisher was recognized by Popular Mechanics for his innovations in sports.

== See also ==
- Joe Breeze
- Klunkerz: A Film About Mountain Bikes
