= Whiteside Marsh =

Marsh and wetlands in California

Coordinates: 38.0561°N 122.5014°W

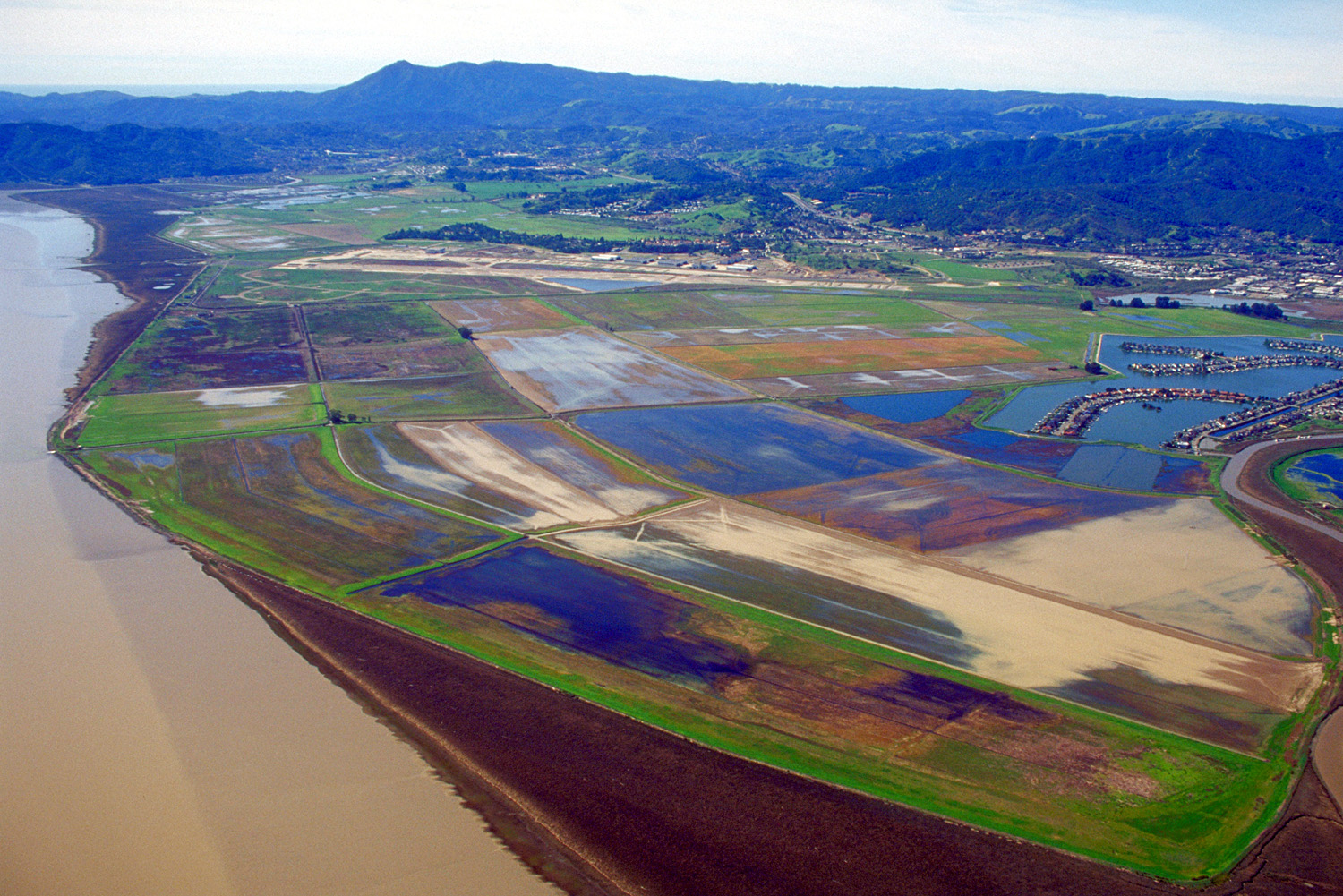
The Hamilton Wetland Restoration Project at Whiteside Marsh, on the former Hamilton Air Force Base.

Whiteside Marsh is a coastal estuary marsh and wetlands on the northwestern shore of San Pablo Bay in northern Marin County, California. It is in and adjacent to the city of Novato and the Bel Marin Keys community, in the North Bay region of the San Francisco Bay Area.

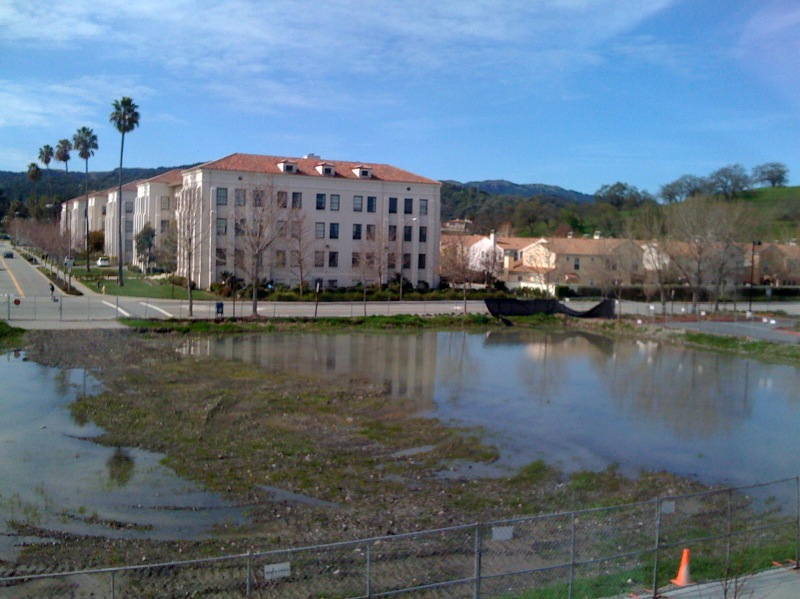
Whiteside Marsh Restoration Project.

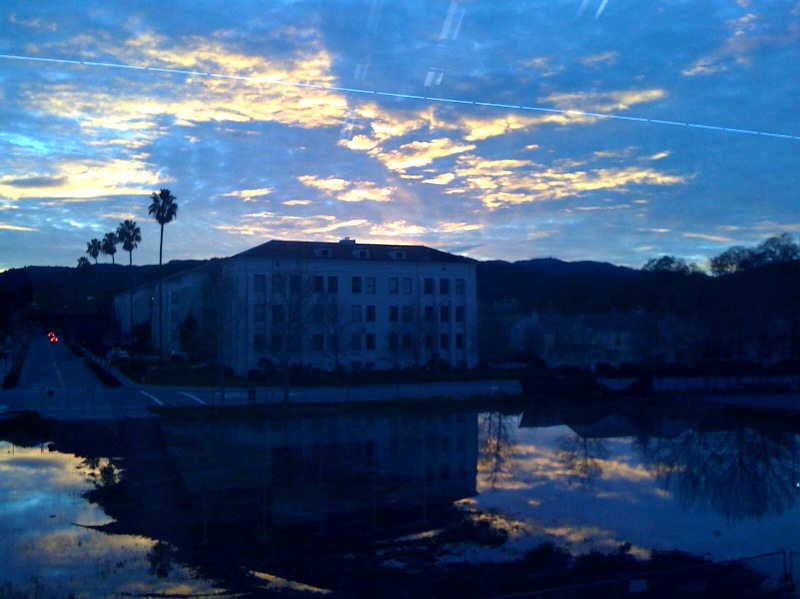
Whiteside Marsh Restoration Project at sunset.

== Restoration ==
The marsh is the site of the Hamilton Wetland Restoration Project, a federal and state wetlands habitat restoration project on the closed Hamilton Army Airfield.

It is a habitat of the endangered California red-legged frog, identifiable as the name implies by distinctive red markings on the legs. It is also nesting habitat for the endangered California Least Tern.

== History ==
Around the turn of the 19th century, marshes at the site were diked, dried out, and farmed. It was the homestead of Peter Whiteside.

Hamilton Air Force Base was built on the site in 1930. It and the subsequent Hamilton Army Airfield occupied the area until the base was closed in 1988.

== See also ==
- Natural history of Marin County, California
- Wetlands of the San Francisco Bay Area
