= Hamilton Wetland Restoration Project =

Wetland restoration project in California, US

Coordinates: 38°4′5.63″N 122°30′6.66″W

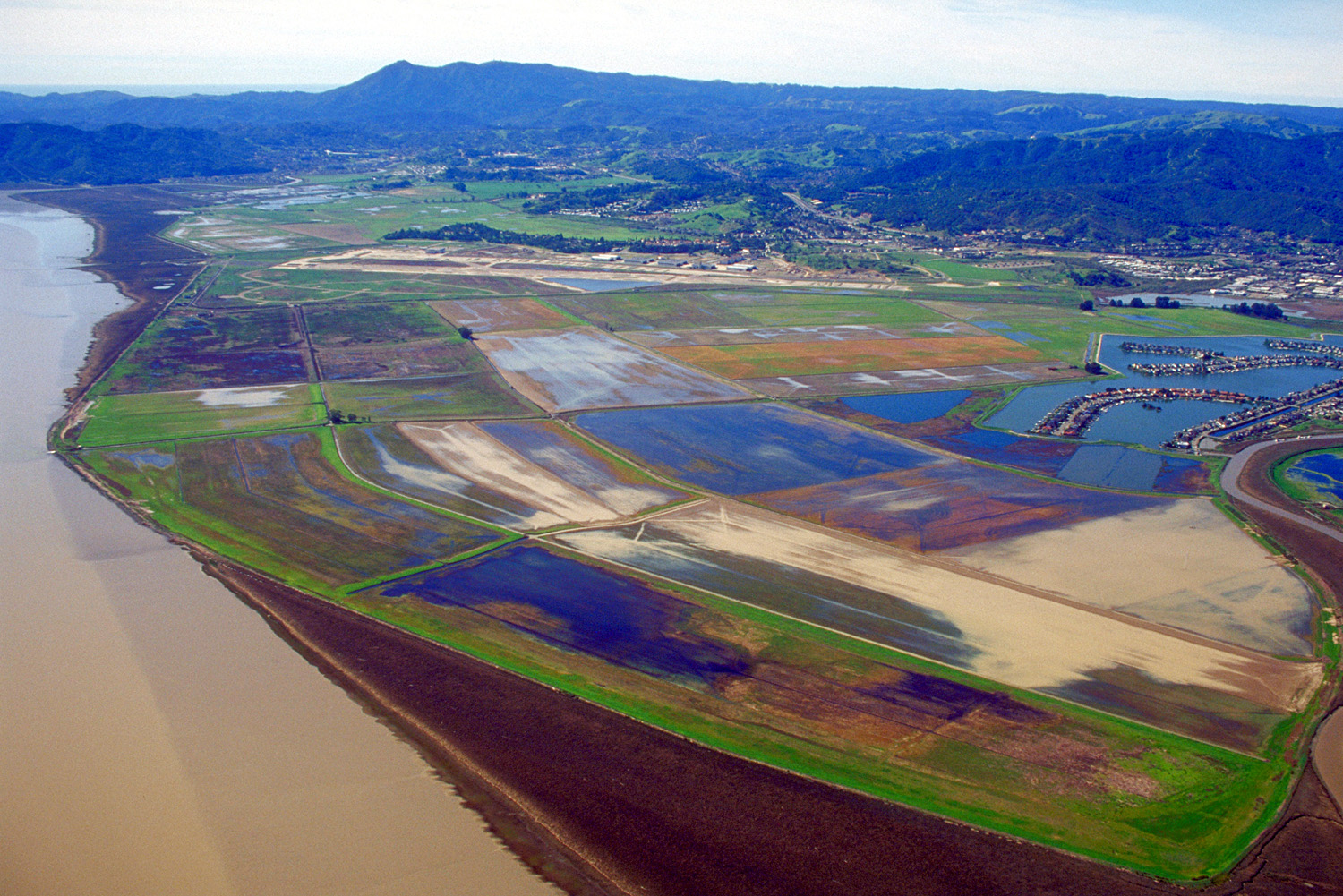
The Hamilton Wetland Restoration Project at Whiteside Marsh, on the former Hamilton Air Force Base

The Hamilton Wetland Restoration Project, now known as the Hamilton/Bel Marin Keys Wetlands Restoration, is a wetlands habitat restoration project at the former Hamilton Air Force Base—Hamilton Army Airfield (1930−1988) site and adjacent Bel Marin Keys shoreline, in Marin County, California.

It is located at Whiteside Marsh on the northwestern shore of San Pablo Bay, in and adjacent to the city of Novato in the North Bay region of the San Francisco Bay Area.

== Project ==
The restoration project is a joint venture between two public agencies: the U.S. Army Corps of Engineers is the lead federal agency, with the California Coastal Conservancy as the local sponsoring agency. In addition, the San Francisco Bay Conservation and Development Commission serves as a collaborating partner.

The U.S. Congress authorized the Hamilton Wetland Restoration Project in 1999, and the addition of the Bel Marin Keys property to the project in 2007. The combined project site comprises approximately 2,600 acres (1,100 ha).

Together, these three agencies are working to restore the Whiteside Marsh section of the closed Hamilton Air Force Base—Hamilton Army Airfield site to its former natural estuary and wetlands condition, and to create valuable endangered species habitat in the urbanized San Francisco Bay Area.

The Hamilton Wetlands Restoration Project "represents an unprecedented opportunity to contribute to the restoration of the San Francisco Bay, which has lost over 86.6% of its natural wetlands since the 1880s."
