= Fairfax, California =

Town in the United States

- Town
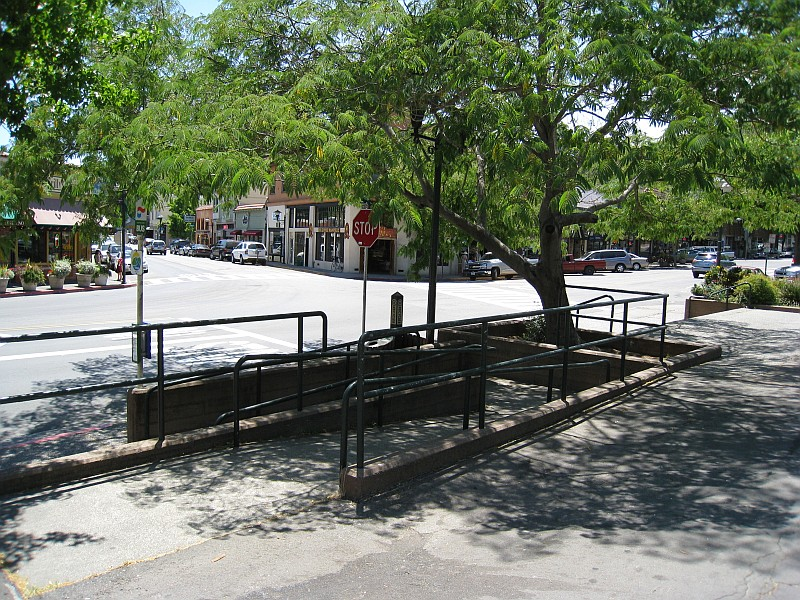
- Downtown Fairfax (The Parkade)

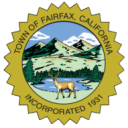
- Seal
- Interactive map of Fairfax, California
- Coordinates: 37°59′14″N 122°35′20″W
- Country: United States
- State: California
- County: Marin
- Incorporated: March 2, 1931
- Named for: The Lord Fairfax of Cameron

Government
  - Mayor: Lisel Blash
  - County Board: District 2 Brian Colbert
  - Town Manager: Heather Abrams
  - Representation: Sen. Mike McGuire (D); Asm. Damon Connolly (D); Rep. Jared Huffman (D)

Area
  - Total: 2.23 sq mi (5.8 km^{2})
  - Land: 2.23 sq mi (5.8 km^{2})
  - Water: 0.00 sq mi (0 km^{2}) 0%
- Elevation: 115 ft (35 m)

Population (2020)
  - Total: 7,605
  - Density: 3,410/sq mi (1,320/km^{2})
- Time zone: UTC-8 (PST)
  - Summer (DST): UTC-7 (PDT)
- ZIP codes: 94930, 94978
- Area codes: 415/628
- FIPS code: 06-23168
- GNIS ID: 277511
- Website: townoffairfaxca.gov

Fairfax is an incorporated town in Marin County, California, United States. As of the 2020 census, its population was 7,605. Fairfax is bordered on the east by San Anselmo and is located 3.25 miles (5.2 km) west-northwest of San Rafael, at an elevation of 115 feet (35 m).

== History ==
The Coast Miwok Native Americans occupied stretches along local creeks, spring and seep areas; moreover, prehistoric habitations were usually chosen near permanent and seasonal drainages, typically along flat ridges and terraces.

The town was named for Lord Charles Snowden Fairfax, American hereditary peer and California Assembly speaker. In 1861, Fairfax was the site of the last political duel in California. Daniel Showalter and Charles W. Piercy, both former assemblymen in the state legislature, decided to settle a political dispute at the home of Lord Fairfax, a mutual friend. Although Fairfax provided lunch to both men and tried to talk them out of it, they eventually headed to an open field nearby and dueled, with Showalter killing Piercy.

The first post office opened in 1910. Fairfax became an incorporated town in 1931.

On May 16, 1946, a B-17 Flying Fortress bomber, crashed on White's Hill just west of Fairfax.

== Geography ==
Fairfax is in western Marin County, bordered to the east by San Anselmo and to the north by unincorporated Sleepy Hollow. The community lies in the valleys of San Anselmo Creek and its tributary Fairfax Creek, and climbs the surrounding hills. It is bordered to the south by the Mount Tamalpais protected watershed.

According to the United States Census Bureau, the town has a total area of 2.2 square miles (5.7 km^{2}), all land.

Soils in the Fairfax area mostly belong to the Tocaloma Series as classified by the U.S. Soil Conservation Service. These soils consist of moderately deep, well-drained soils on uplands. These soils are typically formed from sandstone and shale and often occur on slopes ranging above 15 percent.

== Demographics ==
Historical population
Census	Pop.	Note	%±
1940	2,198		—
1950	4,078		85.5%
1960	5,813		42.5%
1970	7,661		31.8%
1980	7,391		−3.5%
1990	6,931		−6.2%
2000	7,319		5.6%
2010	7,441		1.7%
2020	7,605		2.2%
2025 (est.)	7,417	▼	−2.5%
U.S. Decennial Census; 1860–1870 1880-1890; 1900 1910 1920; 1930 1940 1950; 1960 1970 1980; 1990 2000 2010; 2020

=== 2020 census ===
As of the 2020 census, Fairfax had a population of 7,605. The census reported that 7,579 people (99.7% of the population) lived in households, 16 (0.2%) lived in non-institutionalized group quarters, and 10 (0.1%) were institutionalized.

Racial composition as of the 2020 census
Race	Number	Percent
White	5,998	78.9%
Black or African American	94	1.2%
American Indian and Alaska Native	56	0.7%
Asian	233	3.1%
Native Hawaiian and Other Pacific Islander	20	0.3%
Some other race	349	4.6%
Two or more races	855	11.2%
Hispanic or Latino (of any race)	878	11.5%

The median age was 49.5 years. 18.5% of residents were under the age of 18 and 23.1% of residents were 65 years of age or older. For every 100 females there were 93.5 males, and for every 100 females age 18 and over there were 91.4 males age 18 and over.

100.0% of residents lived in urban areas, while 0.0% lived in rural areas.

There were 3,284 households in Fairfax, of which 27.9% had children under the age of 18 living in them. Of all households, 44.7% were married-couple households, 17.1% were households with a male householder and no spouse or partner present, and 30.0% were households with a female householder and no spouse or partner present. There were 3,470 housing units, of which 5.4% were vacant. Of the occupied units, 2,128 (64.8%) were owner-occupied and 1,156 (35.2%) were rented. The homeowner vacancy rate was 0.6% and the rental vacancy rate was 3.6%.

Demographic estimates

In the 2021 ACS 5-year estimates, there were 389 (11.4%) cohabitating couple households. The average household size was 2.2. There were 1,931 families (6.63% of households); the average family size was 2.7.

The age distribution was 570 people (7.5%) aged 18 to 24, 1,605 people (21.1%) aged 25 to 44, and 2,489 people (32.7%) aged 45 to 64.

Income and poverty

In 2023, the US Census Bureau estimated that the median household income was $131,875, and the per capita income was $76,359. About 5.5% of families and 11.5% of the population were below the poverty line.

=== 2010 census ===
At the 2010 census Fairfax had a population of 7,441. The population density was 3,376.9 inhabitants per square mile (1,303.8/km^{2}). The racial makeup of Fairfax was 6,617 (88.9%) White, 110 (1.5%) African American, 36 (0.5%) Native American, 204 (2.7%) Asian, 4 (0.1%) Pacific Islander, 174 (2.3%) from other races, and 296 (4.0%) from two or more races. Hispanic or Latino of any race were 504 people (6.8%).

The census reported that 7,419 people (99.7% of the population) lived in households, 12 (0.2%) lived in non-institutionalized group quarters, and 10 (0.1%) were institutionalized.

There were 3,379 households, 939 (27.8%) had children under the age of 18 living in them, 1,422 (42.1%) were opposite-sex married couples living together, 319 (9.4%) had a female householder with no husband present, 134 (4.0%) had a male householder with no wife present. There were 267 (7.9%) unmarried opposite-sex partnerships, and 52 (1.5%) same-sex married couples or partnerships. 1,076 households (31.8%) were one person and 320 (9.5%) had someone living alone who was 65 or older. The average household size was 2.20. There were 1,875 families (55.5% of households); the average family size was 2.77.

The age distribution was 1,436 people (19.3%) under the age of 18, 342 people (4.6%) aged 18 to 24, 1,806 people (24.3%) aged 25 to 44, 2,907 people (39.1%) aged 45 to 64, and 950 people (12.8%) who were 65 or older. The median age was 45.9 years. For every 100 females, there were 94.2 males. For every 100 females age 18 and over, there were 92.9 males.

There were 3,585 housing units at an average density of 1,626.9 per square mile, of the occupied units 2,103 (62.2%) were owner-occupied and 1,276 (37.8%) were rented. The homeowner vacancy rate was 0.9%; the rental vacancy rate was 4.9%. 4,917 people (66.1% of the population) lived in owner-occupied housing units and 2,502 people (33.6%) lived in rental housing units.

== Culture ==
In the mid-1960s, a softball game between Jefferson Airplane and the Grateful Dead took place at Central Field (also known as Contratti Park), a public downtown baseball field.

Irving Berlin used to serenade from a treetop piano at Pastori's Hotel, formerly Bird's Nest Glen, the home of Lord Charles Snowden Fairfax, and later known as the Marin Town & Country Club.

The popularity of outdoor hot tubs soared after Al Garvey designed his own redwood hot tub in July 1966, installed outside Al and Barbara Garvey's home on Scenic Road on the hillside leading up to Fairfax Manor. The Garvey hot tub was used by hundreds of people in the first few months, including jazz musician John Handy, eccentric architect Roger Somers and sex worker/feminist Margo St. James. Barbara Garvey said, "We decided to make the hot tub a social enterprise and started throwing parties." Soon, many others had hot tubs of their own. The social fashion of hot-tubbing with friends became connected with Marin County culture and style.

Fairfax is a popular destination for mountain bikers and road cyclists due to its proximity to Mount Tamalpais. In 2015, Joe Breeze and other members of the Mountain Bike Hall of Fame founded the Marin Museum of Bicycling in downtown Fairfax. The museum hosts one of the largest collections of bicycles on the west coast.

== Politics ==
In 2009 Fairfax Town Council became the fourth Green Party majority town council in US history. Three out of five council members registered Green. In 2017, Fairfax had 5,602 registered voters. Of those, 3,726 (66.5%) are registered Democrats, 370 (6.6%) are registered Republicans, 1,528 (27.3%) have declined to state a political party and 155 (2.8%) are registered with the Green Party.

Most of Fairfax is zoned for one-story and two-story buildings. Attempts to permit more housing in the town have been rejected by NIMBY citizens in referendums. In 2025, citizens launched a recall effort against mayor Lisel Blash after she approved a six-story 243-unit apartment building in town as part of efforts to comply with California state law.

== Education ==
Fairfax is in the Ross Valley School District and the Tamalpais Union High School District.

== Notable people ==
=== Births ===
- Polly Klaas (1981–1993), murder victim
- Lonnie Mayne (1944–1978), wrestler
- Ali Prosch (born 1979), artist
- Virgil Shaw, musician
- Alfred Sorensen (1890–1984), writer and mystic

=== Deaths ===
- Keith Donnellan (1931–2015), philosopher and professor
- Andy Kulberg (1944–2002), musician
- Chris Michie (1948–2003), musician
- Robert Peterson (1924–2000), poet
- Charles Wesley Piercy (1833–1861), politician; killed in a duel
- David James Redford (1962–2020), filmmaker
- Archie Williams (1915–1993), athlete and Air Force officer

=== Residents ===
- Joe Breeze (b. 1953), bicycle designer and advocate
- Charlie Cunningham (b. 1948), co-founder of WTB
- Charles Snowden Fairfax (1829–1869), American politician; lived on a large estate that later became the Marin Town and Country Club, and is the namesake for the town.
- Charlie Kelly (b. 1945), co-founder of MountainBikes (along with Gary Fisher)
- Anne Lamott (b. 1954), writer
- Jacquie Phelan (b. 1955), mountain bike racer
- Van Morrison (b. 1945), Northern Irish rock musician; lived in Fairfax in the 1970s
