= Richard P. Hammond (politician) =

American politician

3rd Speaker of the California State Assembly
- In office January 1852 – May 1852
- Preceded by: John Bigler
- Succeeded by: Isaac B. Wall

Member of the California State Assembly from the 7th district
- In office 1851–1853

Personal details
- Born: Richard Pindell Hammond; October 9, 1820 Hagerstown, Maryland, U.S.
- Died: November 28, 1891 (age 71) San Francisco, California, U.S.
- Party: Democratic
- Spouse: Sarah "Sallie" Lea (m. 1854; died 1867)
- Children: 6, including John
- Relatives: Harry T. Hays (brother-in-law)
- Education: United States Military Academy

Military service
- Branch/service: United States Army
- Years of service: 1841–1851
- Rank: Major
- Battles/wars: Mexican–American War: Siege of Vera Cruz; Battle of Cerro Gordo; Battle of Contreras; Battle of Churubusco; Battle of Chapultepec; Battle for Mexico City

Richard Pindell Hammond (October 9, 1820 – November 28, 1891) was an American U.S. Army Major in the Mexican-American War and Democratic politician who served in the California State Assembly and served as its Speaker. Mining engineer, diplomat, and philanthropist John Hays Hammond is his son.

== Biography ==
Hammond was born in Hagerstown, Maryland on October 9, 1820, to William Hammond and Mary Hammond (née Tilghman).

=== Military career ===
Hammond attended the United States Military Academy, graduating in 1841 and being inducted into the United States Army. He served in garrison at Fort McHenry and later at the Augusta Arsenal, where he assisted the Inspector general in investigating claims of losses by Florida, Georgia, and Alabama volunteers during the Seminole Wars. During the Mexican-American War, he was an Aide-de-camp and acting Assistant Adjutant General to Brigadier General James Shields. He fought in the Siege of Vera Cruz, the Battle of Cerro Gordo, the Battle of Contreras, the Battle of Churubusco, the Battle of Chapultepec and the Battle for Mexico City. He was placed on leave in 1850 and resigned his commission in 1851.

=== Civil and political career ===
Hammond arrived in California shortly after leaving the Army, and became a counselor-at-law and land agent in Stockton where he helped design the plans for the city of Castoria, California (now known as Manteca). He was elected to the California State Assembly in 1851 from the 7th district and became Speaker of the Assembly in 1852. After leaving the State Assembly in 1853, he served as Collector of Customs for the District of San Francisco and as President of the Democratic State Convention of California in 1859.

=== Later career ===
He briefly worked as a farmer, before becoming the general superintendent of the San Francisco and San Jose Railroad, and then served as vice president and later president of the California Pacific Railroad. He was on the San Francisco Board of Education and later on the San Francisco Board of Police Commissioners, serving as president of both. He also served as a regent on the University of California Board of Regents.

=== Death ===
Hammond died in San Francisco in 1891 and was buried at Mountain View Cemetery in Oakland, California.

== Family ==
He was married to Sarah Elizabeth "Sallie" Lea (née Hays) from 1854 until her death in 1867. He is the brother-in-law of Confederate Army General Harry T. Hays and the father of notable mining engineer, philanthropist, and diplomat John Hays Hammond.

Preceded by John Bigler	Speaker of the California State Assembly; January 1852 – May 1852	Succeeded by Isaac B. Wall
