= 11th Fighter Wing =

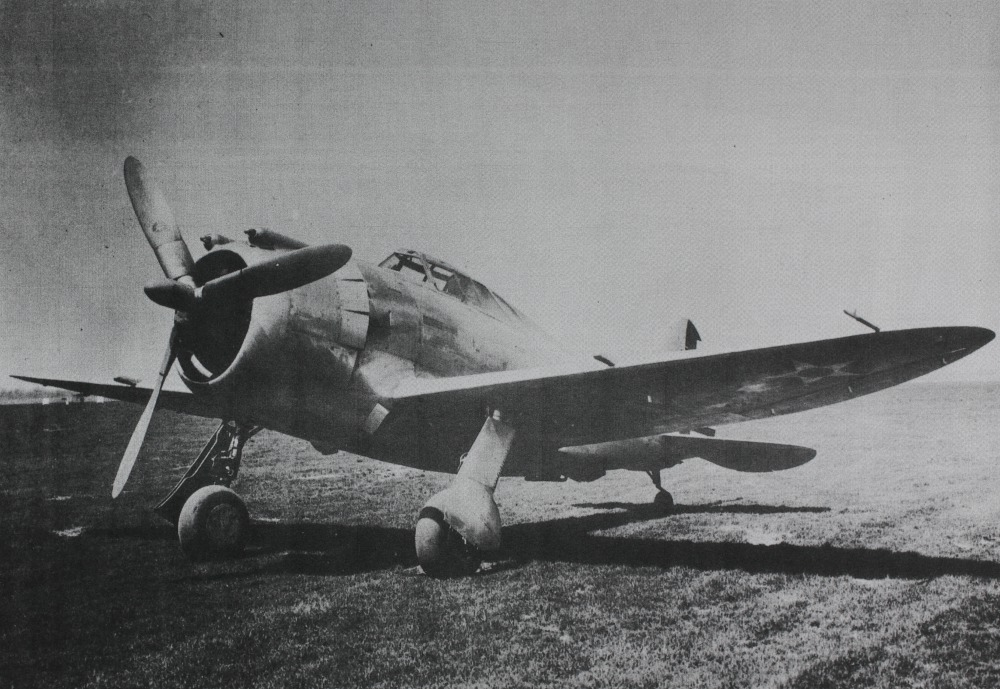
- P-43 Lancer as flown by the wing
- Active: 1940–1941, 1942–1943
- Country: United States
- Branch: United States Air Force
- Role: Command of fighter units

The 11th Fighter Wing is a disbanded United States Army Air Forces organization. It was activated in 1940 (86 years ago), with two groups assigned, but was inactivated the following year. It was activated again in 1942, but then disbanded in 1943 (83 years ago).

The wing was reconstituted in 1985 as the 367th Electronic Warfare Group but was never active before being disbanded again in 1992.

== History ==
The wing was constituted in late 1940 at Hamilton Field, California in the buildup of the United States Army Air Corps in response to the start of World War II in Europe. It moved to Army Air Base, Portland in 1941, where it assumed responsibility for organizing two pursuit groups. It was inactivated later that year, and its personnel used as part of the cadre for headquarters units of Fourth Air Force.

The wing was activated the following year at Drew Field, Florida. Although it was programmed for overseas deployment to the European theater and was assigned to Eighth Air Force, it was attached to Third Air Force for training. It was never assigned any combat groups and was disbanded before deploying overseas.

In 1985 the wing was reconstituted on paper as the 367th Electronic Warfare Group, but was never active before being disbanded again in 1992.

== Lineage ==
- Constituted as the 11th Pursuit Wing on 19 October 1940

Activated on 18 December 1940
Inactivated on 2 October 1941

- Redesignated 11th Fighter Wing in October 1942

Activated on 1 November 1942
Inactivated on 1 May 1943

- Disbanded on 1 December 1943
- Reconstituted on 31 July 1985 and redesignated 367th Electronic Warfare Group (not active)
- Disbanded on 9 September 1992

=== Assignments ===
- Northwest Air District 18 December 1940 – 2 October 1941
- Eighth Air Force, 1 November 1942 – 1 May 1943 (attached to Third Air Force)

=== Stations ===
- Hamilton Field, California, 18 December 1940
- Army Air Base, Portland, Oregon, June 1941 – 2 October 1941
- Drew Field, Florida, 1 November 1942 – 1 May 1943

=== Components ===
- 54th Pursuit Group, 15 January 1941 – 2 October 1941
- 55th Pursuit Group, 9 April 1941 – 2 October 1941 (Note: Assignments per Maurer. The current AFHRA Factsheets for the 54th Fighter Group and 55th Operations Group indicate assignment to higher headquarters.)

=== Aircraft ===
- Curtiss P-36 Hawk, 1941
- Lockheed P-38 Lightning, 1941
- Curtiss P-40 Warhawk, 1941
- Republic P-43 Lancer, 1941

=== Commanders ===
- Lt Col W. R. Clingerman
