= Fairfax, California B-17 crash =

1946 aviation accident

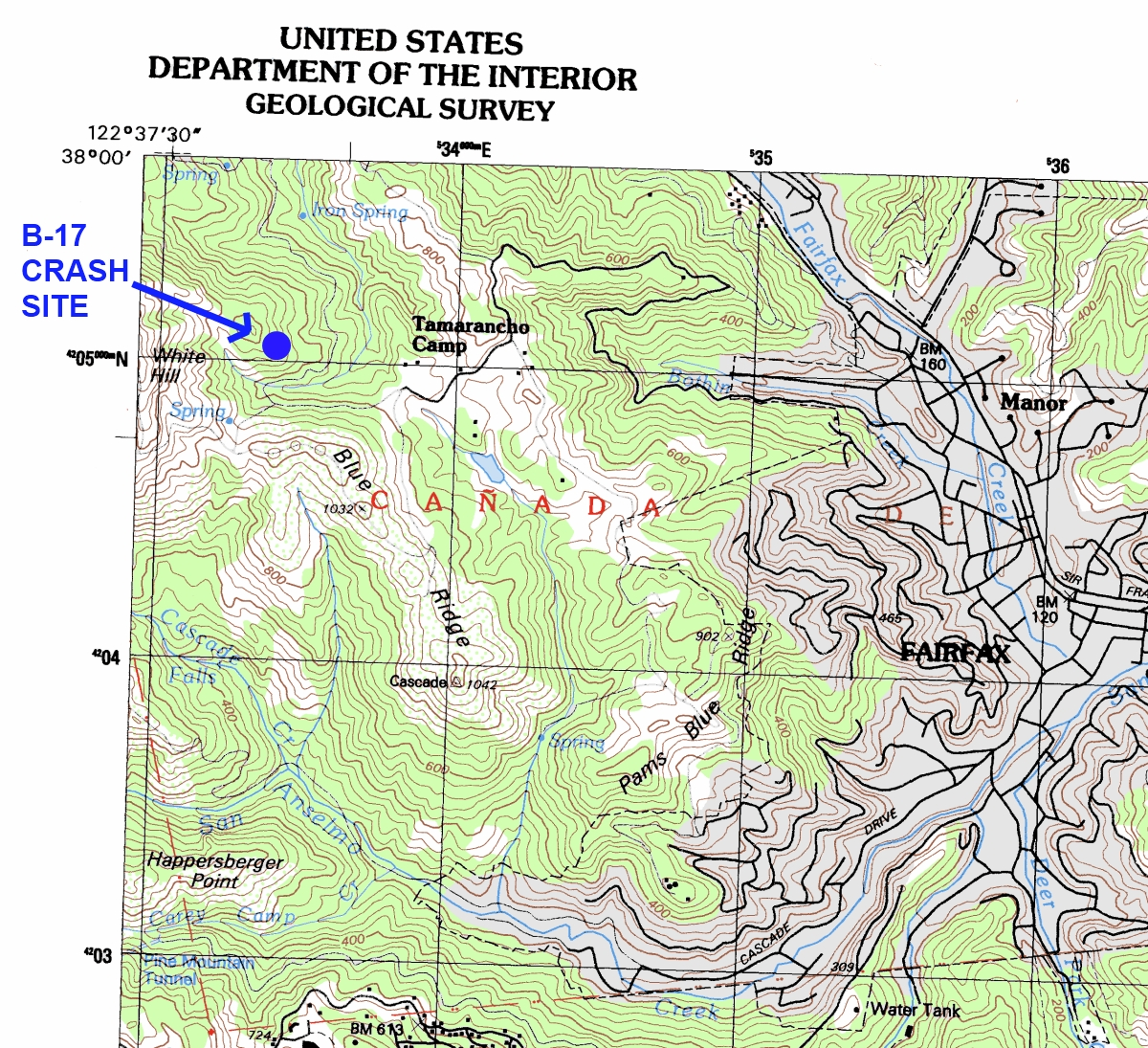
Crash site of B-17

Early on the morning of May 16, 1946, a U.S. Army B-17 Flying Fortress aircraft crashed into White Hill (a.k.a. "White's Hill") near Fairfax, California. Two men were killed and six seriously injured. There were reports that the B-17 was carrying nuclear weapons materials for the Operation Crossroads tests at Bikini Atoll, but these reports were not confirmed. However, due to the behavior and activities of the military authorities at the crash site and the reports of several credible witnesses, including several of the crewmembers, questions about the plane's cargo remain.

== Itinerary ==
The plane, which carried the serial number of 44-85510, took off at 4 pm on May 15 from Clovis Army Airfield in Clovis, New Mexico. This was the training base for B-17s involved in preparations for the Bikini tests. Lieutenant Warder Skaggs was the pilot. Along with three other crewmen there were 12 passengers. After a stop at Davis-Monthan Field near Tucson, Arizona, and another at Mines Field near Los Angeles, where several passengers disembarked, the plane was en route to Hamilton Army Airfield, also called Hamilton Field, in Marin County, California. The plane was due to arrive at Hamilton at 1:17 a.m. on the morning of the 16th.

== Navigation error ==
Just before 2 a.m. on May 16, Naval Air Station Oakland radio operators heard a call from the crew of the B-17. The crew reported that their plane was running low on fuel and was lost in the fog. The B-17 was actually flying over Hamilton Field when they were in communication with the Oakland Naval Station Airport radio operators, but because of the dense fog the crew of the B-17 thought they were flying over the Oakland Naval Station Airport. Tragically, so did the Oakland radio operators. Oakland instructed the B-17 to descend to 1,500 ft (460 m) and head out over the ocean; this would enable the Oakland operators to pick the plane up on radar. The crew of the B-17 followed instructions and descended to 1500 feet, but instead they smashed into the side of White Hill, just west of Fairfax. The plane slid 75 yards down the slope, and came to rest. The location was nine air miles southwest of Hamilton Field, and about eighteen miles by road.

The pilot and co-pilot were the only ones able to extricate themselves from the wreckage, though several others were still alive. Seriously injured, they made their way down the hill to a nearby convalescent home, where they were able to use the telephone to contact authorities.

== Emergency response and nuclear cargo theory ==
Within an hour, dozens of civilian rescue personnel arrived on the scene, followed by military police. After the other survivors had been rescued and the bodies of those who died had been removed, the military authorities kept onlookers away at gunpoint as they used cranes to remove two large crates from the wreckage. Although the Army vehemently denied that the B-17 had anything to do with the Operation Crossroads tests, much less carried any nuclear cargo, suspicions continued to run high in the region. The following week, the local newspaper suggested that if "... the flying Fortress which crashed above Fairfax last week [had] not been loaded with top secret equipment having to do with the Bikini Atomic Bomb Test, perhaps there would not have been such a wild rush to heavily guard the wreck". Many question the nuclear cargo theory based on the fact the B-17 was obsolete and more capable planes, such as the B-29 or C-54 were readily available.

== Causes ==
The plane had the fuel capacity for a nonstop transcontinental flight, and had refueled near Los Angeles, just 400 miles south. However, the cause of the crash was laid to lack of fuel as well as pilot error.
