= Charles S. Fairfax =

American politician (1829–1869)

The Right Honorable The Lord Fairfax of Cameron
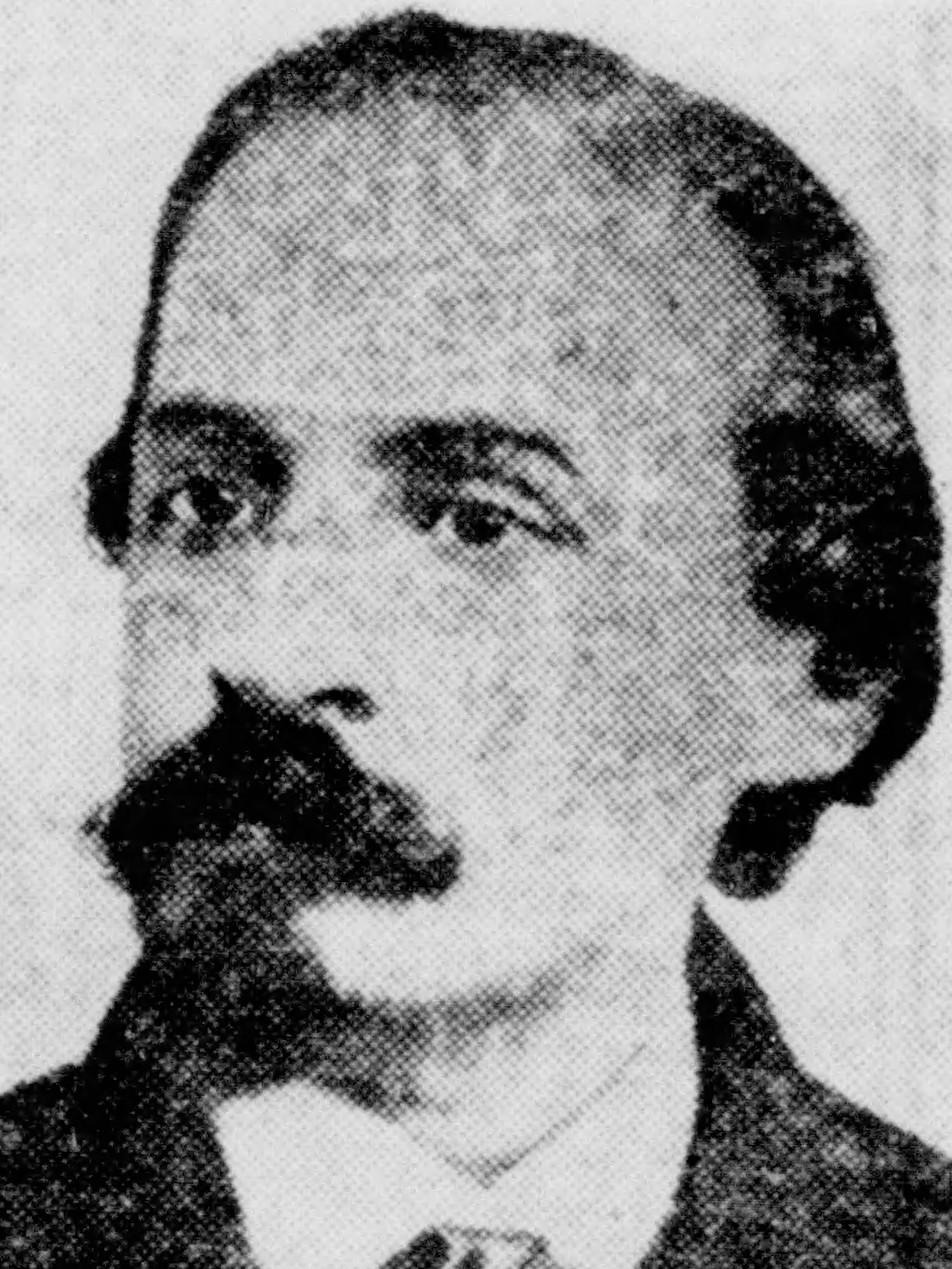

5th Speaker of the California State Assembly
- In office Jan 1854 – May 1854
- Preceded by: Isaac B. Wall
- Succeeded by: William W. Stow

Member of the California State Assembly from the 15th district
- In office January 3, 1853 – January 1, 1855

Personal details
- Born: Charles Snowden Fairfax; March 8, 1829 Vaucluse Plantation, Virginia, U.S.
- Died: April 4, 1869 (aged 40) Baltimore, Maryland, U.S.
- Resting place: Rock Creek Cemetery
- Party: Democratic
- Spouse: Ada Benham (m. 1855)
- Relations: Thomas Fairfax, 9th Lord Fairfax of Cameron (grandfather); John Fairfax, 11th Lord Fairfax of Cameron (brother)
- Parents: Albert Fairfax, Master of Fairfax (father); Mistress Caroline S. Fairfax (mother)
- Profession: Politician

Charles Snowden Fairfax, 10th Lord Fairfax of Cameron (March 8, 1829 – April 4, 1869) was an American peer and Democratic politician, who served as the speaker of the California State Assembly in 1854. Lured west during the California gold rush, the town of Fairfax, California is named for him.

== Early life and family ==
He was born on Vaucluse Plantation in Virginia, the eldest son of Albert Fairfax, Master of Fairfax, and Caroline Eliza Snowden, who were married on April 7, 1828. His younger brother was John Contee Fairfax, 11th Lord Fairfax of Cameron, who became Lord Fairfax of Cameron upon Charles' death in 1869. His paternal grandfather was Thomas Fairfax, 9th Lord Fairfax of Cameron. On May 1, 1838, his mother married William R. Saunders.

== California ==
Fairfax, still the potential 10th Lord Fairfax of Cameron, left Richmond, Virginia, with 74 other gold-seekers on the ship Glenmore. After disembarking and crossing Panama, he boarded a second ship, the steamer California, and arrived in San Francisco on June 23, 1850.

The life of a miner in the mother lode of California might have been somewhat of a shock to Fairfax, who grew up as a gentleman farmer, but he stuck with the endeavor for a while. He prospected extensively, only to lose whatever money he made as fast as he got hold of it. There were stories of him working for others, pushing a wheelbarrow, or tending a mule pulling a cart of gravel and sloshing about in the mud of the diggings.

In 1851, he abandoned the goldfields and turned to a new calling—politics—and became a delegate to the Democratic National Convention. Fairfax was a member of the California State Assembly, first representing Yuba and Sierra Counties from 1853 to '54, then Yuba County alone from 1854 to '55. He served as Speaker of the Assembly in 1854. He subsequently served as Clerk of the Supreme Court of California, 1856–'61. From 1865 to 1867, he was a Supervisor of Marin County.

== Personal life ==
In 1854, Fairfax met his wife, Ada Benham, the daughter of Joseph S. Benham of Cincinnati, in San Francisco. They were married on January 10, 1855, in Louisville, Kentucky, at the home of her stepsister, Henrietta Prentice. He left no issue.

=== Estate in California ===
After their return to San Francisco, Fairfax and his bride visited his boyhood friend Dr. Alfred W. Taliaferro at his country home in Marin County. When they expressed their great admiration of his estate, he gave them the property as a wedding gift. Thus, in 1855, the couple became residents of what would eventually become the town of Fairfax.

The Fairfax estate was near the site of the last political duel fought in California, on the afternoon of May 25, 1861, between State Assemblymen Daniel Showalter and Charles W. Piercy. Though Fairfax served them lunch and tried to dissuade them, the two men walked to a grassy meadow and fired rifles at 40 paces; Piercy was killed by the second volley.

They made many improvements to their new property and called it Bird's Nest Glen. Fairfax imported game birds to satisfy his zeal for hunting and improve his chances for success. Ada planted trees and flowers and named the estate.

They entertained lavishly and it became so customary for their friends to say, "Let's go to the Fairfax's," or "Let's go to Fairfax," that the area took on the identity of Fairfax, which continued long after their departure, up to the time of the town's incorporation in 1931.

In 1925, the Emporium bought the property, which later became the Marin Town and Country Club.

Bird's Nest Glen is now on the National Register of Historic Places as California Registered Historical Landmark No. 679. The plaque is on the site, at the Marin Town and Country Club.

=== Death ===
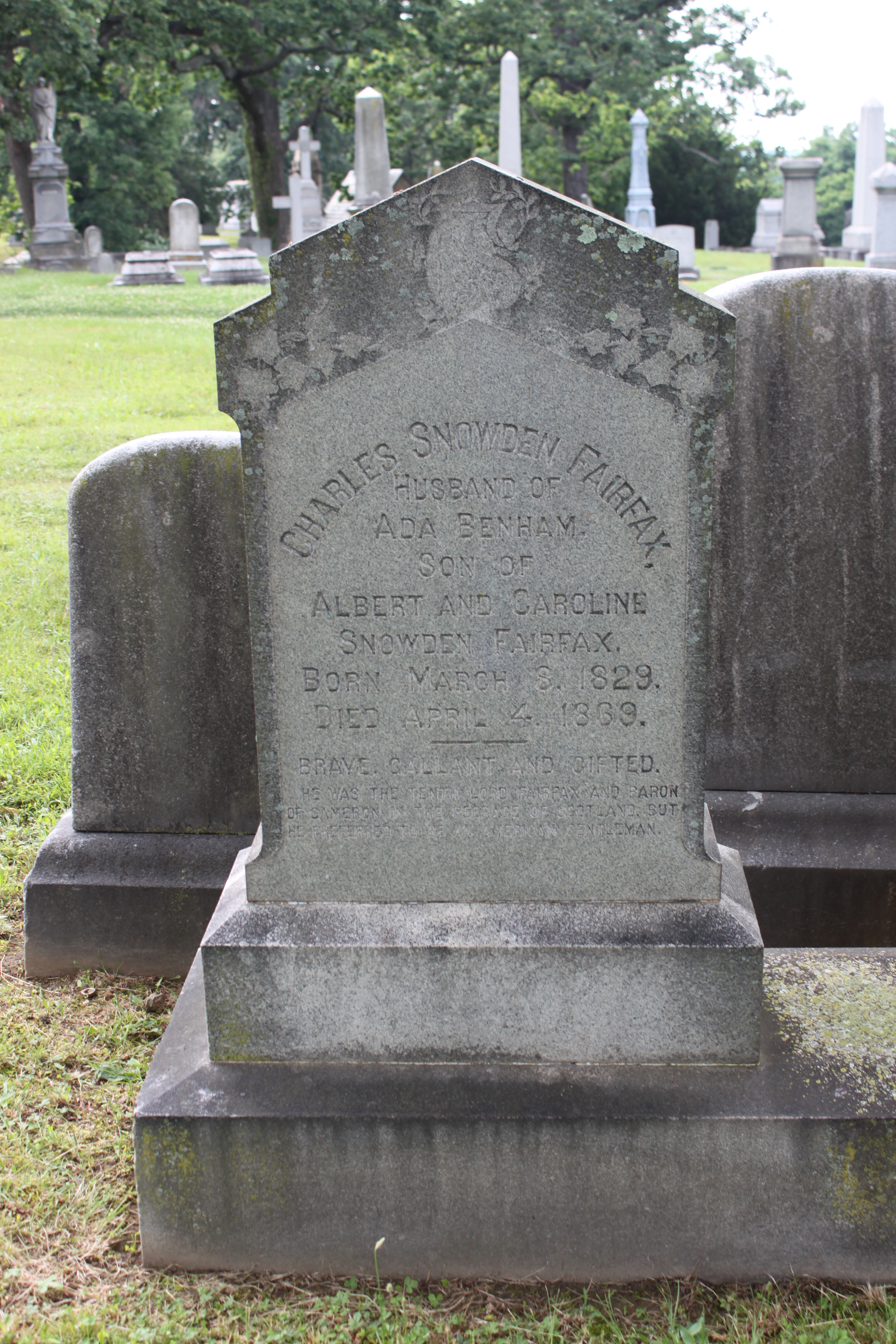
Grave of Fairfax at Rock Creek Cemetery

Charles S. Fairfax died suddenly, at age 40, at Barnum's City Hotel in Baltimore, Maryland, after having traveled east as a chairman of the California delegation to the Democratic National Convention, which was assembled in New York City. He is interred in Rock Creek Cemetery, Washington, D.C., as is his widow.

His wife Lady Ada Fairfax, now widowed, moved to Fort Ross, California, until she sold her holdings and moved to Washington, D. C.

Fairfax was thoroughly identified with the state of his adoption, and was well known and respected on the Pacific coast. He stood high in the Masonic fraternity, the members of which arranged to send a large delegation at the time of his death.

== Sources ==
- New York Times, April 7, 1869, from the Baltimore Sun, April 5, "Death of a Lineal Descendant of Lord Fairfax in Baltimore," p. 11.
- Aberdeen Journal, Notes and Queries, Vol. I, "The Fairfax Peerage," p. 158.
- 1860 Sacramento Co., CA, U.S. Federal Census, Sacramento Ward 1, June 11, sht. 44, p. 43 B, line 18.
- San Francisco Ship Passenger Lists, Volume I (1850–1864), p. 17.
- California Inter Pocula, by Hubert Howe Bancroft, "Duelling," p. 776.
- Fairfax, by William Sagar and Brian Sagar, "Charles Snowden Fairfax," Ch. 3, pp. 15–17.
- New York Times, September 30, 1900, "Titled American Dead," p. 7.
- Rock Creek Cemetery, Washington, District of Columbia, sexton records.
- Lord and Lady Fairfax, Fairfax Historical Society, Fairfax California, July 2002
- More about Charles and Ada Fairfax, Fairfax Historical Society, Fairfax California, Fall 2004

Peerage of Scotland
Preceded by Thomas Fairfax	Lord Fairfax of Cameron; 1846–1869	Succeeded by John C. Fairfax
Political offices
Preceded by Three members	California State Assemblyman, 15th District; 1853–1854 (with two others)	Succeeded by Six members
Preceded by Three members	California State Assemblyman, 15th District (Yuba County seat); 1854–1855 (with four others)	Succeeded by Five members
Preceded by Isaac B. Wall	Speaker of the California State Assembly; January 1854–May 1854	Succeeded by William W. Stow
