= Isaac B. Wall =

American politician

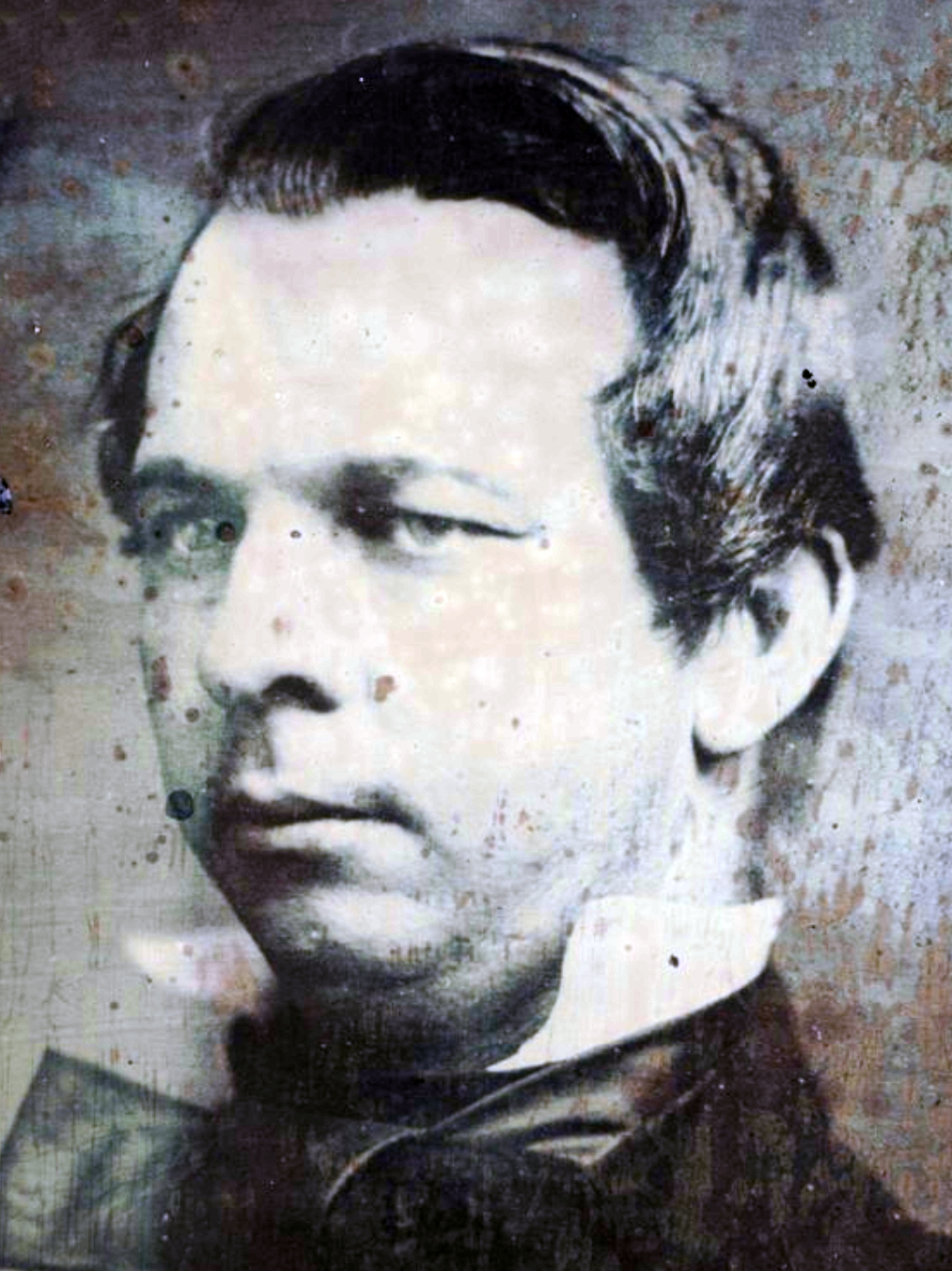

4th Speaker of the California State Assembly
- In office January 1853 – May 1853
- Preceded by: Richard P. Hammond
- Succeeded by: Lord Charles S. Fairfax

Member of the California State Assembly
- In office 1852–1853
- Constituency: 5th district
- In office 1851–1852
- Constituency: 6th district

Personal details
- Born: c. 1823
- Died: November 11, 1855 (aged 31–32) Chualar, California, U.S.
- Party: Democratic

Isaac B. Wall (c. 1823 – November 11, 1855) was a Democratic politician from California who is best known for serving in the California State Assembly from the 5th and 6th districts from 1851 to 1853. He served as Speaker of the Assembly in 1853. After leaving the California State Assembly, Wall became the customs collector for the port of Monterey, California between 1853 and 1855. He was killed in a robbery near what is now Chualar, California on November 11, 1855.

Preceded by Richard P. Hammond	Speaker of the California State Assembly; January 1853 – May 1853	Succeeded by Lord Charles S. Fairfax
