= Charles Wesley Piercy =

American politician (1833–1861)

Charles Wesley Piercy (1833–1861), was a California Democratic politician, Assemblyman, and Douglas Democrat who was killed in a duel with a Southern Democrat Assemblyman Daniel Showalter in the last political duel in California.

== Biography ==
Charles Wesley Piercy was born in Decatur County, Iowa, on June 11, 1833 to Nathan Piercy and Elizabeth Scott Piercy. He came across the continent to California in 1852, in a small party that included Daniel Showalter of Pennsylvania; however, upon arrival in California they went their separate ways. Piercy settled in El Monte and in 1858, joined with others there in purchasing and reselling the lands of Mormons returning to Utah at the time of the Utah War. Allied to those interests, he was elected Sheriff of San Bernardino County in 1859. Piercy resigned in October 1860 to run for a seat in the State Assembly.

In the bitterly contested campaign of 1860, Charles W. Piercy was nominated for member of the 1st District of the California General Assembly by one party, and W. A. Conn, the incumbent, by the other. Piercy was elected, but there were claims of fraud. The accusation was that polls at Temescal, maintained by a local resident named James Greenwade, remained open for three weeks and continuously furnished votes for Piercy. The case was taken to court, where the two opposing lawyers, H. M. Willis and Bethel Coopwood, had a fight in which Coopwood sustained a slight wound, but won the case. Piercy won his seat as a member of the 1861-62 California State Assembly, representing California's 1st State Assembly District.

Piercy and Daniel Showalter, an Assemblyman who represented the Breckinridge Democrats, disagreed over the U.S. Senate election to a point that provoked a duel. On May 25, 1861 their duel with rifles, was held in Fairfax, California at the home of Democratic politician Charles S. Fairfax. After attempts to prevent the duel were made by friends, the first shots were exchanged and both parties missed, Showalter asked for a second firing, and managed to shoot Piercy, who was killed. It was the last duel between political figures in California.

Charles W. Piercy was buried in Lone Mountain Cemetery, in San Francisco. When San Francisco passed an ordinance in 1912 evicting all existing cemeteries from city limits the remains of Piercy were sent to Colma.
