= William W. Stow =

American politician (1824–1895)

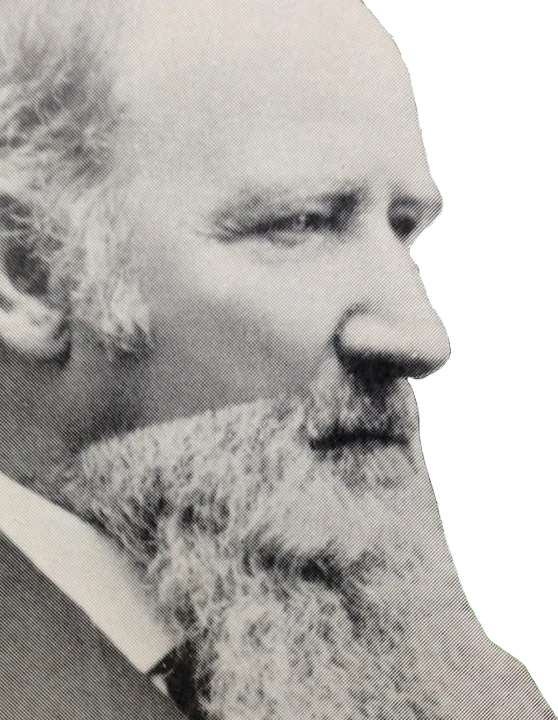

6th Speaker of the California State Assembly
- In office January 1855 – May 1855
- Preceded by: Lord Charles S. Fairfax
- Succeeded by: James T. Farley

Member of the California State Assembly from the 3rd district
- In office 1854–1857

Personal details
- Born: September 13, 1824 Binghamton, New York, US
- Died: February 20, 1895 (aged 70) San Francisco, California, US
- Party: Whig; Know Nothing
- Spouse: Ann Eliza Patterson
- Children: 6

William W. Stow (September 13, 1824 – February 20, 1895) was an American politician and member of the California State Assembly from the 3rd district between 1854 and 1857; he was Speaker in 1855. Blue Heron Lake in Golden Gate Park in San Francisco was formerly named "Stow Lake" after him.

== Life and career ==
Stow was born in Binghamton, New York in 1824.

He was elected to the California State Assembly as a Whig in 1853 and served until 1857, serving as Speaker of the Assembly in 1855. In 1856, he was a primary candidate for the Know Nothing party for Governor of California but lost. He then served as a confidential attorney for the Southern Pacific Railroad between 1870 and 1893. He was also on the Golden Gate Park board between 1889 and 1893.

Stow died unexpectedly in San Francisco in February 1895. He is buried in Mountain View Cemetery in Oakland.

== Antisemitic views and legislation ==
Stow was highly antisemitic and described Jews as "a class of people here only to make money and who leave the country as soon as they make money." He attempted to use blue laws to restrict the commerce of Shabbat-observant Jews, commenting: "I am for a Jew-tax that is so high that [Jews] would not be able to operate any more shops." On another occasion, Stow said: "I have no sympathy with the Jews and would, it were in my power, enforce a regulation that would eliminate them from not only our county but from the entire state!"

In October 2022, three San Francisco city supervisors introduced a resolution urging the Recreation and Park Commission to rename Stow Lake due to Stow's outspoken antisemitism, as part of an effort to rename various landmarks across the San Francisco Bay Area. In January 2024, the Commission decided on the new name of Blue Heron Lake, in honor of the blue herons that nest along the lake.

Preceded by Lord Charles S. Fairfax	Speaker of the California State Assembly; January 1855–May 1855	Succeeded by James T. Farley
