= Bel Marin Keys, California =

Unincorporated community in California, United States

Bel Marin Keys
- Unincorporated community
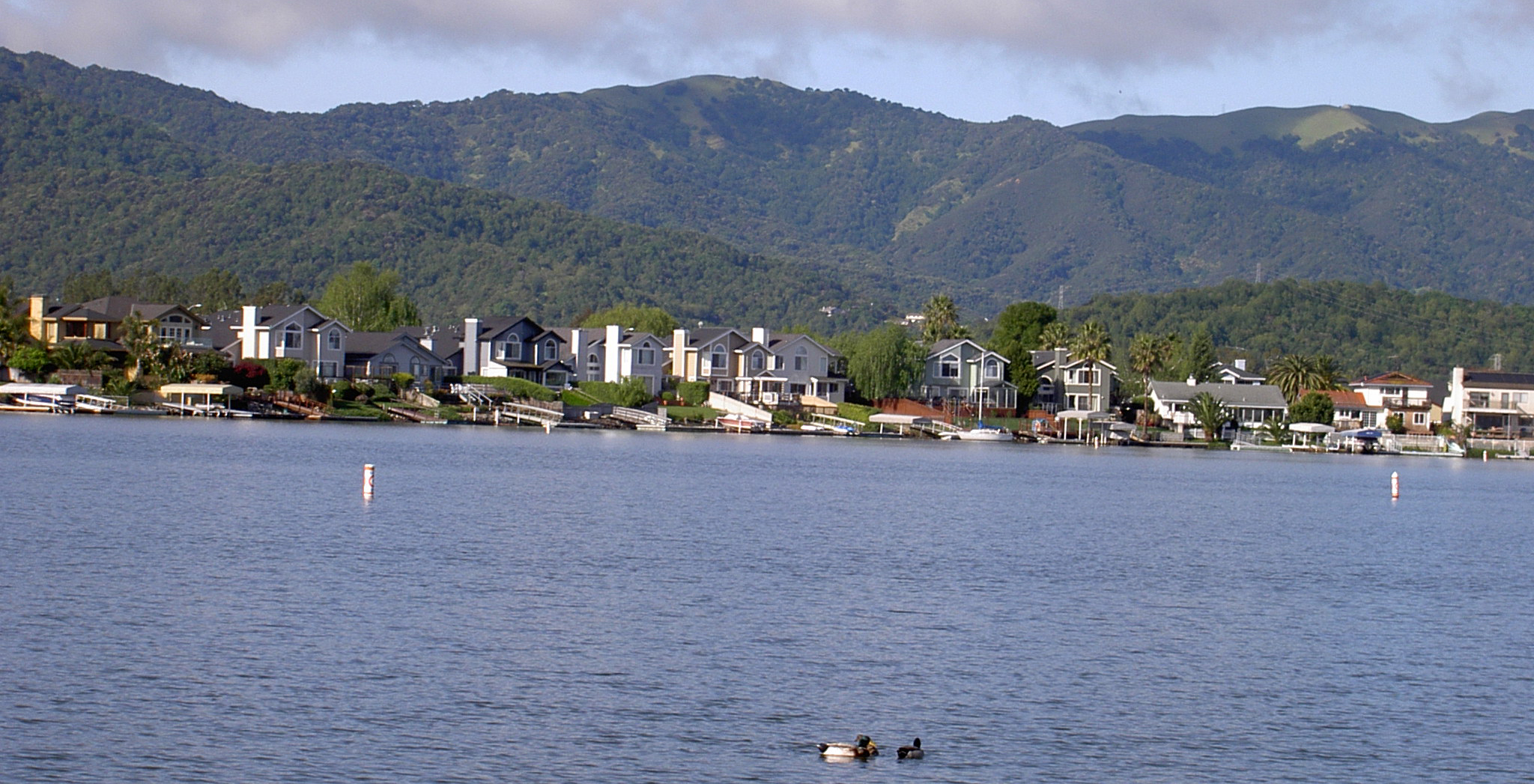
- A row of backyard boat docks along Del Oro Lagoon in Bel Marin Keys

- Location in California Bel Marin Keys (the United States)
- Coordinates: 38°04′56″N 122°30′53″W
- Country: United States
- State: California
- County: Marin
- Elevation: 9.8 ft (3 m)

Population (2020)
  - Total: 1,556
- Area codes: 415/628

Bel Marin Keys is an unincorporated community in Marin County, California, United States. It lies at an elevation of 10 feet (3.0 m).

== Geography ==
Bel Marin Keys is a waterfront community located east of the city of Novato. The community has approximately 700 homes. Most of the homes sit either on one of the many lagoons or on Novato Creek. All of the lagoons have access to San Pablo Bay through the navigational locks. The community is served by ZIP code 94949 and area codes 415 and 628.

Bel Marin Keys was a planned community built between the late 1950s and late 1980s. Phases 1 through 4 were completed, but phase 5 was never built; instead, the land is in the process of being restored back into the wetlands of Whiteside marsh, which were drained in the early 1900s for farmland. Phase 5 would have roughly doubled the size of Bel Marin Keys had it been built.

In March 2024, residents voted to approve a $30 million parcel tax; the money will build stronger and taller levees, plus an improved set of locks to keep adjacent waters from spilling into the lagoons adjacent to residences.

== Government ==
In the California State Legislature, Bel Marin Keys is in the 2nd Senate District, and in the 10th Assembly District.

Federally, Bel Marin Keys is in California's 2nd congressional district, represented by Democrat Jared Huffman.
