= Daniel Showalter =

American politician

- Born: 1830; Greene County, Pennsylvania, U.S.
- Died: 1866 (aged 35–36); Mazatlán, Mexico
- Occupations: Miner, politician

Daniel Showalter (1830–1866), was a California miner, state legislator, duelist, secessionist, and Confederate States of America military officer in Texas.

== Early life ==
Daniel Showalter was born in Greene County, Pennsylvania and came to California in 1852, settling in Coulterville.

== Career ==
Showalter became a miner in Horseshoe Bend, Mariposa County. He ran for and won a seat in the California State Assembly 6th District in 1857–1858 and 1861–1862. In 1861, he voted against a state resolution for California to stay in the Union (which passed the assembly). During the vote, Charles W. Piercy prevented him from saying why he was opposed to it. The two men argued and Piercy challenged him to a duel.

Despite dueling being officially illegal in California at the time, it proceeded nonetheless on Saturday afternoon, May 25, 1861, near the residence of Charles S. Fairfax, three miles west of San Rafael in Marin County. The weapons chosen were rifles, to be fired at a distance of forty yards. The first fire was ineffective and Showalter demanded another. On the second fire, Showalter shot Piercy in the mouth and killed him. This was the last of the duels between political figures in California.

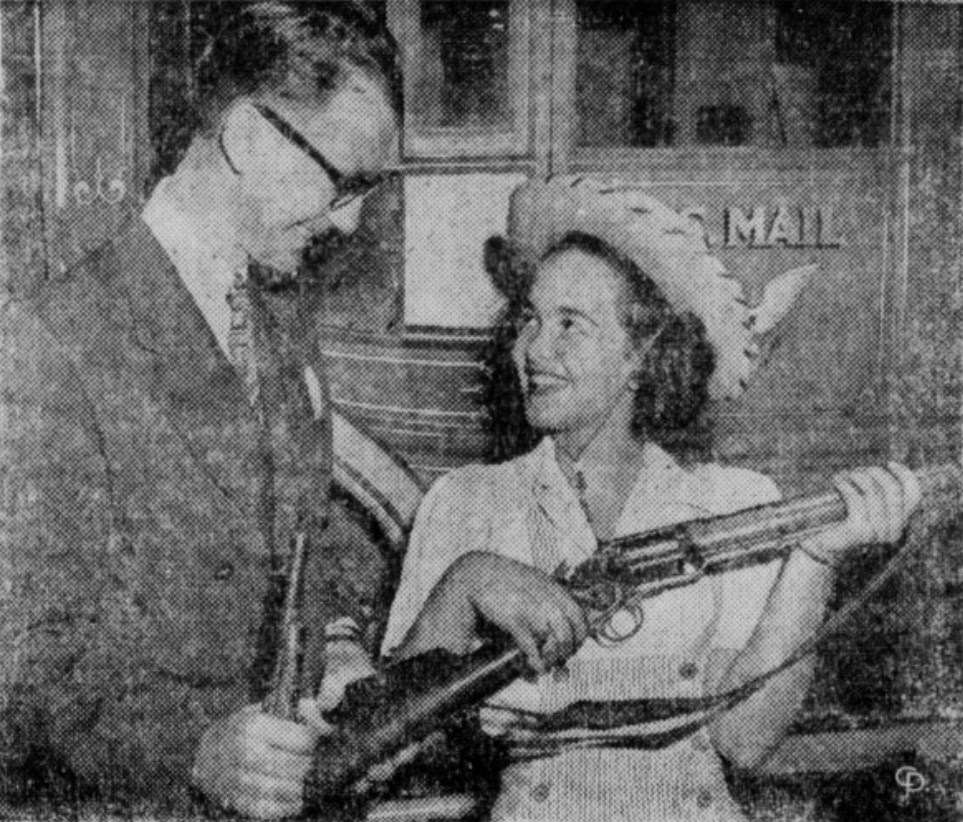
Photograph of Barbara Friberg holding Daniel Showalter's rifle used during the duel, 1947

Now a fugitive as a result of the duel, Showalter made his way south to Los Angeles County, joining with friends and fellow secessionist sympathizers who wanted to go east to join the Confederate States Army. This party was caught at Minter Ranch on November 29, 1861, by a 1st California Cavalry Regiment patrol under Second Lt. C. R. Wellman from Camp Wright, in the mountains southwest of the Warner's Ranch, in the San Jose Valley of eastern San Diego County. On December 10, fearing a large rescue party was coming from El Monte, the commander of Camp Wright sent them under guard to Fort Yuma. Eventually they were released after swearing allegiance to the Union. Showalter then went on to Texas where he was made lieutenant colonel of the 4th Texas Cavalry, Arizona Brigade.

In March 1864, Lt. Col. Daniel Showalter joined the force under John Salmon Ford and led his regiment in fighting around Brownsville, Texas, to drive the Union troops out of South Texas. After the Union troops evacuated, Showalter occupied Brownsville, June 30. When his commander, Colonel Ford, fell ill, Showalter was found drunk and unable to command the army. On May 12, 1865, General Day attacked Showalter at Palmito Hill, Showalter was drunk again and unable to command his unit and the enemy artillery caused the 4th Arizona to panic without leadership. George Henry Giddings came up with his battalion, rallied the disorderly unit and stabilized the defense some miles east of Palmito Hill. Showalter was immediately relieved of his command of the 4th Arizona and it was given to Major F. E. Kavanaugh.

After the war he went to Mexico in August 1865, and managed a hotel in Mazatlán.

== Death ==
Showalter died of lockjaw, a result of a bar fight in 1866 in Mazatlán, Mexico.
