= Hamilton Field (Hamilton AFB) =

Closed US military base in Marin County, California

Hamilton Field/AFB/AAF
- Part of Air/Aerospace Defense Command
- Located in Novato, California
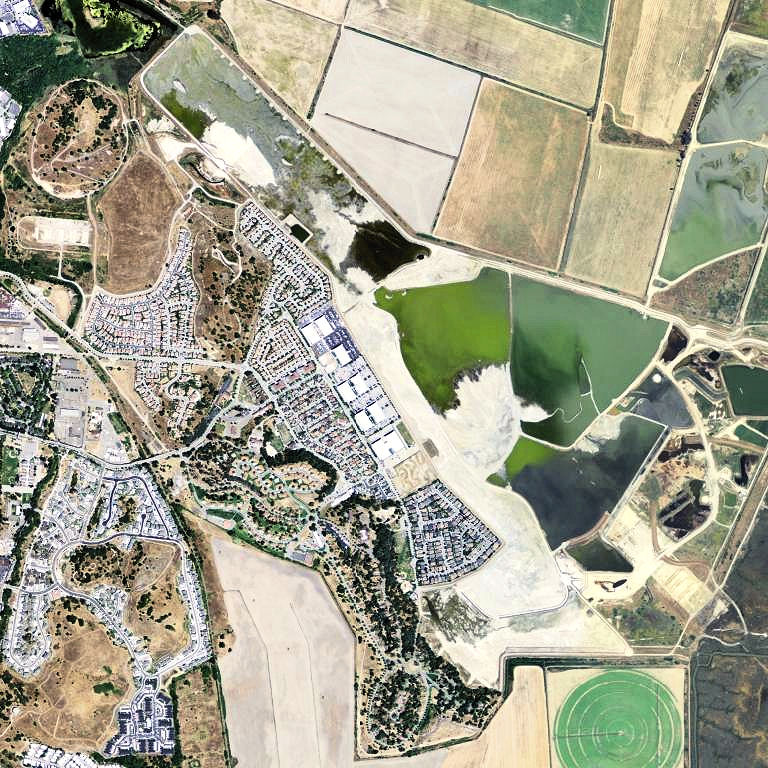
- Hamilton Field, 2006 US Geological Survey photo

Site information
- Type: Air Force base
- Controlled by: United States Army Air Corps; United States Army Air Forces; United States Air Force; United States Army

Location
- Location within California Location within the United States
- Coordinates: 38°3′28″N 122°30′45″W

Site history
- Built: 1932–1935
- In use: 1934–1974

Garrison information
- Garrison: Aerospace Defense Command

Hamilton Field (Hamilton AFB) was a United States Air Force base located along the western shore of San Pablo Bay in the southern portion of Novato, in Marin County, California. Constructed between 1932 and 1935, it was inactivated in 1973, decommissioned in 1974, and put into a caretaker status with the Air Force Reserve until 1976. It was transferred to the United States Army in 1983 and was designated an Army Airfield until its BRAC closure in 1988.

== History ==
Hamilton Field was named after First Lieutenant Lloyd Andrews Hamilton of the 17th Aero Squadron. Hamilton was awarded the Distinguished Service Cross for "extraordinary heroism in action" in Varsenare, Belgium, where he led a low level bombing attack on a German airdrome 30 miles (50 km) behind enemy lines on 13 August 1918. Thirteen days later, Hamilton died in action near Lagnicourt, France.

== Origins ==
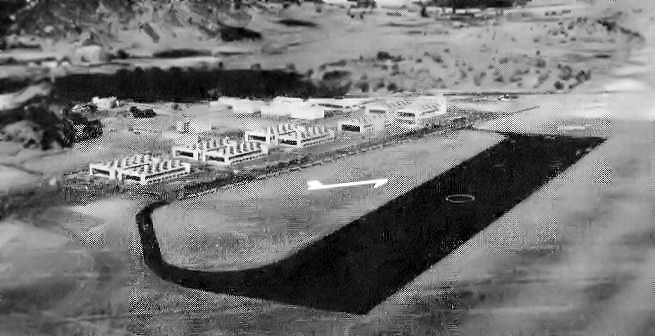
Hamilton Field, 1937

What would eventually become Hamilton Air Force Base has its origins in the late 1920s, when the airfield was first established. It was first unofficially named; the Marin County Air Field, Marin Airfield, Marin Meadows Air Field, and the Army Air Base at Marin Meadows. It was officially termed from 1929 until 1932 the "Air Corps Station, San Rafael." With formal development beginning, it was named Hamilton Field on 12 July 1932.

Construction of the airfield began about 1 July 1932, with the airfield being originally designed to accommodate four bomb squadrons and their personnel. Captain Don L. Hutchins, later Colonel Don L. Hutchins in WWII, of the US Army Air Corps (USAAC) reported on duty as the first commanding officer of the new field on 25 June 1933, and Captain John M. Davies' 70th Service Squadron arrived that December as the first squadron assigned to the base.

The Hamilton Field Station Complement replaced the 70th Service Squadron on 1 March 1935. The original construction program was completed on 12 May 1935, at which time the field was ceremonially handed over to Brigadier General Henry 'Hap' Arnold, commanding the 1st Wing, by Governor Frank Merriam of California.

The U.S. Weather Bureau had an official cooperative weather station on the base from 1934 to 1964.

=== Bomber mission ===
Hamilton Field was originally a bomber installation. On 5 May 1934, the first planes assigned to Hamilton were Martin B-10 and B-12 bombers of the 7th Bombardment Group, having been transferred from March Airfield. Shortly thereafter, amphibious reconnaissance aircraft of the 88th Observation Squadron were assigned to Hamilton.

The B-12 bombers housed at Hamilton Field were phased out in 1937, and the 7th Bomb Group was re-equipped with the Douglas B-18 Bolo. The B-18 was a standard two-engine short-range bomber, and was capable of airlifting combat-equipped troops en masse, an important advance in combat techniques at the time.

The next step forward in bomber technology was the development of the Boeing B-17 Flying Fortress, a four-engine airplane that was bigger, faster, and heavier than any previous bomber and required a longer and stronger runway to operate. Because the runway at Hamilton Field was not adequate for the B-17, the larger planes had to go elsewhere. In 1939, the 7th Bombardment Group was designated a "heavy" bomb group and was moved to Fort Douglas, Utah on 7 September 1940, to train with B-17s.

=== Fighter mission ===
Hamilton became a fighter base under the USAAC Air Force Combat Command in December 1940, becoming the home of the 9th, 10th and 11th Pursuit Wings. The 9th PW was reassigned from March Field, bringing the 14th and 51st squadrons equipped with the Curtiss P-40 Warhawk. Two other pursuit wings, the 10th, with the 20th and 35th Pursuit Groups, and the 11th, with the 51st, 54th and 55th Pursuit Groups, were activated at Hamilton in December 1940, all equipped with P-40s, the Republic P-43 Lancer, and a scattering of older Curtis P-36 Mohawks.

The arrival of the pursuit wings and their crews caused crowding at the base and initiated the first of many housing problems. Hamilton was assigned to the USAAC 4th Air Force, on 7 December 1941, and the airfield was designated an air defense base for the West Coast as part of the Western Defense Command on 5 January 1942.

=== Attack on Pearl Harbor ===
In response to the growing crisis in the Pacific, on 6 December 1941, the 38th Reconnaissance Squadron (30th Bombardment Group) with four B-17Cs and two new B-17Es left Hamilton Field bound for Hickam Field, Hawaii on their way to Clark Field in the Philippines to reinforce the American Far East Air Force there. None were armed. After leaving Hamilton, and flying all through the night, the bombers arrived over Oahu on the morning of 7 December 1941, and faced an unusual welcome. The B-17s had arrived over Oahu during the Japanese air attack on Hawaii which triggered American entry into World War II. They arrived at Pearl Harbor at the height of the attack (radar operators mistakenly thought that the Japanese attack force was this flight arriving from California). Two of the planes managed to land at a short fighter strip at Haliewa, one made a belly-landing at Bellows, one set down on the Kahuku Golf Course, and the remainder landed at Hickam under the strafing of Japanese planes.

The B-17Es of the 7th Bombardment Group were moved back to Hamilton from Utah for deployment to the Far East. Six of them arrived in Hawaii just after the Pearl Harbor attack, but the rest of them were ordered to remain in California and were sent south to Muroc AAF near Rosamond.

== World War II ==
During World War II, Hamilton was an important West Coast air training facility. Its mission was that of an initial training base for newly formed fighter groups. The airfield was rapidly expanded to a wartime status, with construction of additional barracks, mess halls, administration buildings, warehouses, Link Trainer buildings, schools, hospital and other structures.

The following units trained at Hamilton:

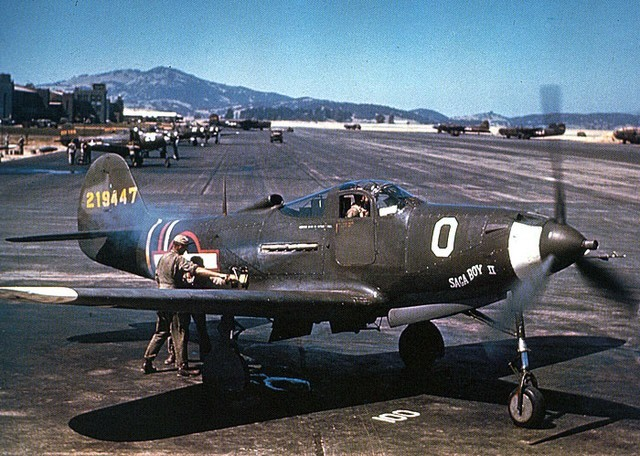
Bell P-39Q-1-BE Airacobra 42–19447 at Hamilton Field, 1943

Group	Assigned dates	Aircraft type
78th Fighter Group	May 1942 – November 1942	P-38 "Lightning"
329th Fighter Group	10 July 1942 – 13 July 1942	P-38 "Lightning"
354th Fighter Group	10 November 1942 – 18 January 1943	P-39 "Airacobra"
357th Fighter Group	1 December 1942 – 4 March 1943	P-51 "Mustang"
363rd Fighter Group	1 March 1943 – August 1943	P-39 "Airacobra"
367th Fighter Group	15 July 1943 – 11 October 1943	P-38 "Lightning"
369th Fighter Group	1 August 1943 – 5 November 1943	P-40 "Warhawk"
372nd Fighter Group	28 October 1943 – 7 December 1943	P-40 "Warhawk"
478rd Fighter Group	1 December 1943 – 12 December 1943	P-39 "Airacobra"

Auxiliary training fields used by Hamilton Field during World War II were:

- Montague Air Force Auxiliary Field 41°43′45″N 122°32′30″W
- Napa Army Airfield 38°12′56″N 122°16′49″W
- Willows Municipal Airport 39°31′12″N 122°13′13″W
- Redding Army Airfield 40°30′42″N 122°17′38″W
- Siskiyou County Army Airfield 41°46′53″N 122°28′05″W

In addition, the Air Transport Command (ATC) used Hamilton as a major aerial port and transshipment facility for troops and cargo heading to the Pacific and CBI Theaters. The ATC West Coast Wing was headquartered at the airfield, with the 64th Transport Group being assigned early in 1942. The 1503rd AAF Base Unit was also stationed here.

== Postwar use ==
In 1946, the Fairfax, California B-17 crash took place as a B-17 bomber attempted to land at Hamilton Field.

Hamilton remained Air Transport Command's primary West Coast facility until May 1946 when it moved to nearby Fairfield-Suisun Army Air Base. During this time Hamilton functioned also as a major separation center for returning troops. ATC successor Military Air Transport Service (MATS), and later Military Airlift Command (MAC), retained a presence at Hamilton through the Air Force Reserve, which based several Air Transport, and later Military Airlift wings at the base until it closed in 1976. Strategic Air Command also assigned several reserve reconnaissance groups to Hamilton in the late 1940s, flying photographic missions with RB-29 Superfortresses. Tactical Air Command assigned the F-84 Thunderjet-equipped 349th Fighter-Bomber Wing in the mid-1950s to Hamilton also as part of its reserve forces.

However, the new Air Defense Command, was the major presence at Hamilton after World War II, using the base as headquarters for the air defense of the Pacific Coast. The base went through a series of command redesignations during this period. In the United States Army Air Forces reorganization of 1946 it was assigned to Air Defense Command (ADC). Later, in 1948 the base was assigned to Continental Air Command (CONAC), then back to Air Defense Command in 1951, then, as its usefulness waned, to the Air Force Reserve in 1973.

=== 325th Fighter Group/Wing ===
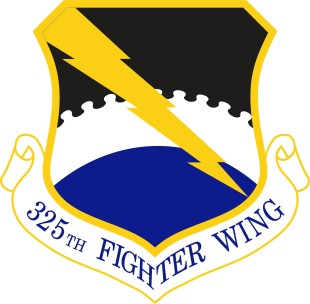

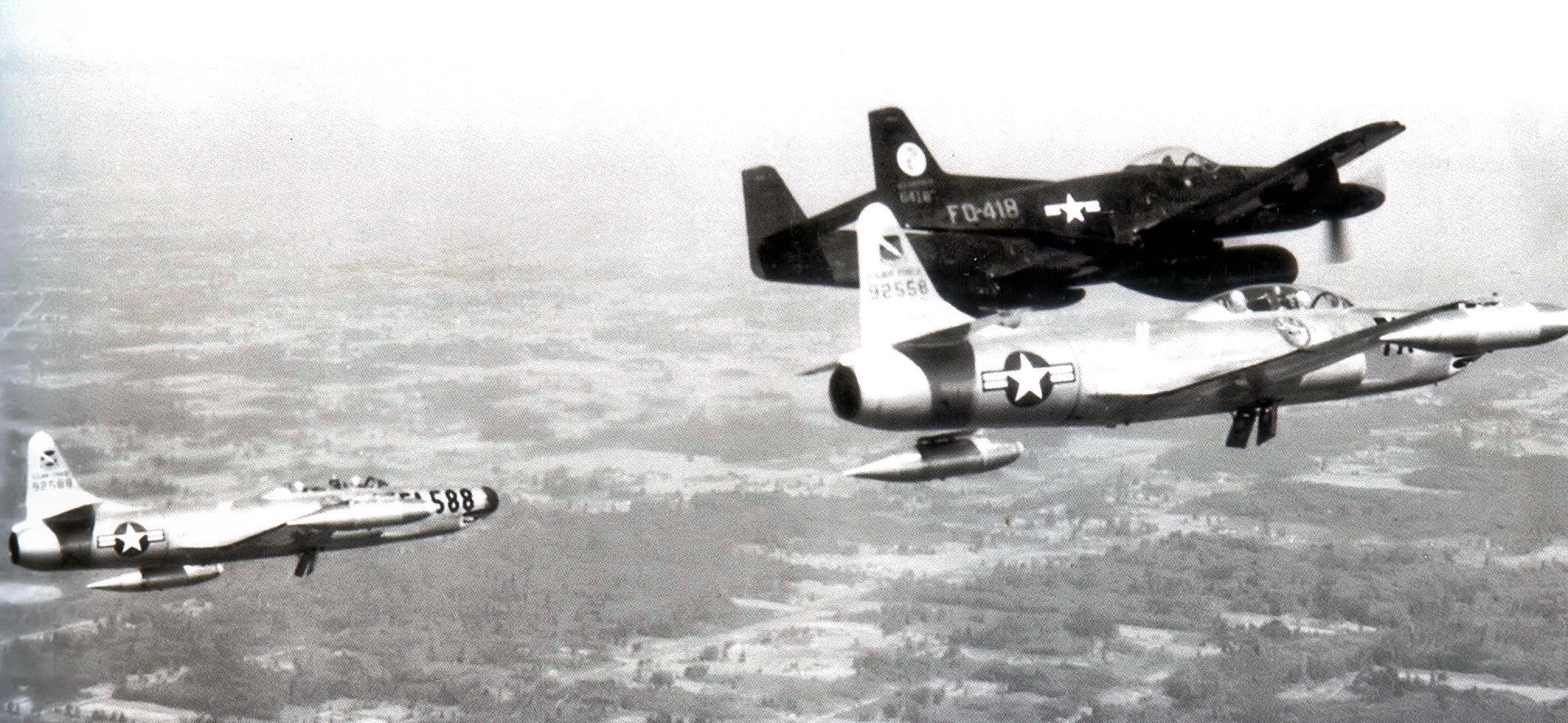
North American F-82F Twin Mustang (46-418) of the 325th FG (AW) and two Lockheed F-94A-5-LO (49–2558, 49–2588) Starfires

The initial Air Defense Command major unit at Hamilton was the 325th Fighter Group which was reassigned from Mitchel AAF, New York on 9 April 1947. Squadrons of the 325th FG were the 317th and 318th Fighter Squadrons, both being initially equipped with the Northrop P-61 Black Widow. The units mission was air defense training missions along the West Coast.

In the immediate postwar years, the Black Widow was pressed into service as an air defense interceptor in response to the USAAF's problems in developing a useful jet-powered night/all-weather fighter. The war-weary P-61s were soon replaced in May 1948 by the North American F-82F Twin Mustang, and on 10 May the Wing and component groups and squadrons were redesignated as All Weather. The 325th was the first Air Defense Command group to receive the F-82.

The 325th Fighter Wing (All Weather) also was established on 10 May 1948, as part of the "one base, one wing" concept, with the 325th Fighter Group becoming a subordinate unit of the wing. The unit was transferred on 27 June 1948, to Moses Lake AFB, Washington for the purpose of defending the Hanford Nuclear site.

=== 78th Fighter Wing ===
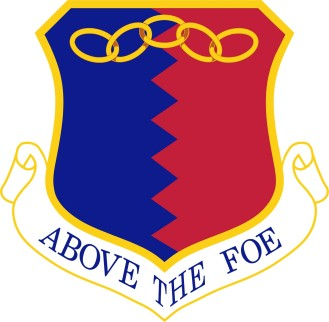

With the departure of the 325th for Washington, the 78th Fighter Wing was activated at Hamilton on 16 November 1948, with the 78th Fighter Group being reassigned from Mitchel AFB as its subordinate operational unit. During World War II, the 78th Fighter Group trained at Hamilton with P-38 Lightnings in 1942 and served as part of its air defense organization. Although briefly inactivated between 1952 and 1956, the 78th Fighter Wing was the host unit at Hamilton until it was inactivated in 1969.

The 78th Fighter Group's initial operational fighter squadrons were the 82d, 83d, and 84th (Jet). The 82d and 83d squadrons were equipped with F-51D Mustangs, while the 84th flew the Republic F-84B Thunderstreak. As its predecessor, the 325th, the mission of the 78th Fighter Wing was the air defense of the Pacific coast. The wing and subordinate units were redesignated as the 78th Fighter-Interceptor Wing on 20 January 1950.

The first production Northrop F-89B Scorpion interceptor was accepted by the USAF during February 1951, and entered service with the 84th Fighter Interceptor Squadron. However, in retrospect, the F-89B was rushed into squadron service too rapidly. There were not enough trained pilots and radar operators, and there were not enough maintenance personnel who knew the intricacies of the complex and troublesome Hughes E-1 fire control system. The in-service rate of the F-89B was appallingly low, and crashes were all too frequent.

In 1949, the ADC Western Air Defense Force (WADF) was established at Hamilton on 1 September and the 28th Air Division (28th AD) was activated 8 December. The WADF was responsible for the air defense of the Western United States, and controlled air defense units in Washington, Oregon, California, Arizona, Nevada, Idaho, Wyoming, Colorado, Montana and New Mexico. Its subordinate 28th AD controlled the operational air defense Groups and Squadrons.

=== 566th Air Defense Group ===
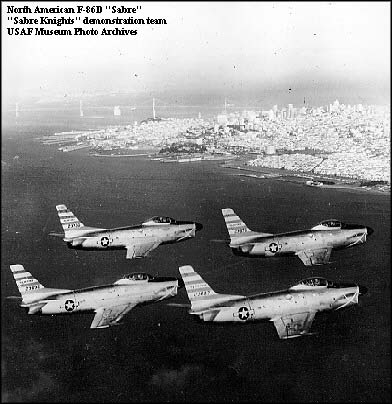
The F-86D "Sabre Knights" aerial demonstration team from Hamilton AFB, CA about 1954

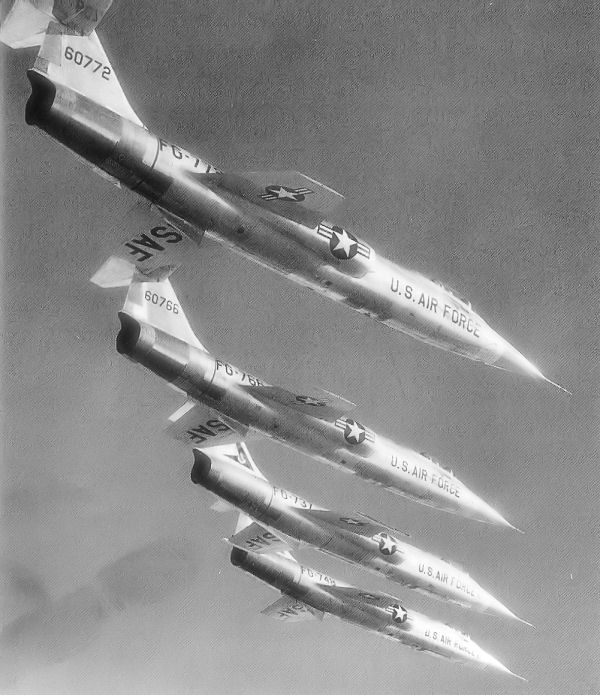
The 83d FIS showing off their brand-new Starfighters in 1958. Lockheed F-104A-15-LO Starfighters, AF Ser. No. 56-0772 and AF Ser. No. 56-0776 are identifiable.

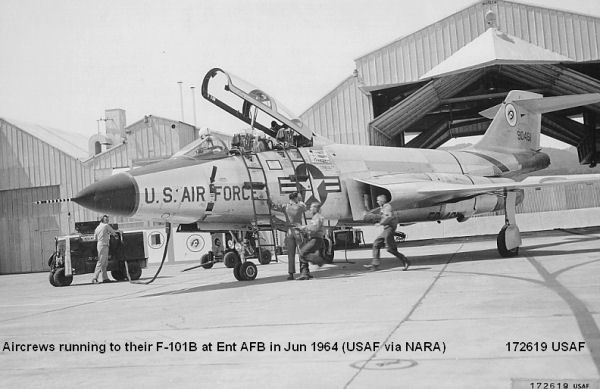
A 84th FIS McDonnell F-101B-120-MC Voodoo, AF Ser. No 59–0461, erroneously captioned as being at Ent AFB, Colorado in 1964. Ent AFB never contained an airfield; the photo was probably taken at alert facilities at Hamilton AFB or Oxnard AFB, California in 1964.

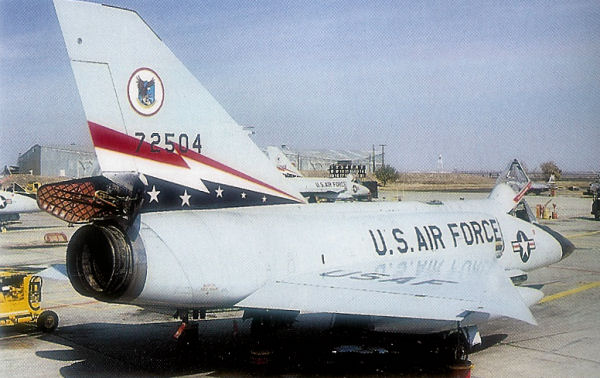
A Convair F-106A-90-CO Delta Dart, AF Ser. No. 57-2504, of the 84th FIS. This aircraft served in ADC and later ADTAC for many years until being retired in 1988, then being expended as a QF-106 drone on 2 August 1993.

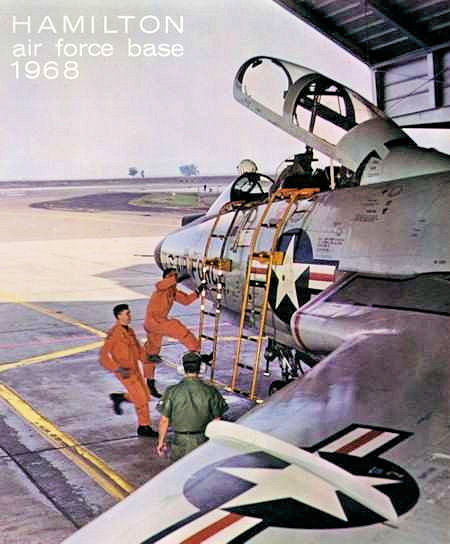
The cover of the 1968 Hamilton AFB yearbook showing a F-101 in the alert hangar bay

As part of a reorganization of Air Defense Command, on 6 February 1952, the 78th FIW was inactivated and in its place, the 4702d Defense Wing stood up at Hamilton. The 4702d was a placeholder unit until the 566th Air Defense Group of the 28th Air Division assumed control of the base on 7 November 1952. Units of the 566th ADG at Hamilton were:

- 83d Fighter-Interceptor Squadron (6 February 1952 – 18 August 1955) (F-86F)
- 84th Fighter-Interceptor Squadron (6 February 1952 – 18 August 1955) (F-86F)
- 325th Fighter-Interceptor Squadron (April 1954 – 18 August 1955) (F-86D)
  Reassigned from Travis AFB, California
- 496th Fighter-Interceptor Squadron (20 March 1953 – August 1954) (F-86D)

When the 78th FIW was inactivated, the 82d FIS was transferred to the 4703d Defense Wing at Larson AFB, Washington.

During its time at Hamilton, the 325th FIS sponsored the "Sabre Knights" aerial demonstration team. In August 1955 the 325th unit designation was transferred to Truax Field, Madison, Wisconsin.

The 496th FIS was activated on 20 March 1953, as a fighter-interceptor squadron at Hamilton as part of the west coast air defense forces. Partially equipped at first with six F-51Ds, the squadron soon transitioned to F-86D aircraft and prepared to move to Europe. In August 1954 the 496th FIS was transferred to Hahn Air Base West Germany to stand air defense alert. Although based at Hahn, the 496th FIS was assigned to the USAFE 86th Fighter-Interceptor Wing at Ramstein Air Base.

On 18 August 1955, the 78th Fighter Group (Air Defense) was reactivated at Hamilton under the 28th AD with the 83d and 84th Fighter-Interceptor Squadrons flying F-86D Sabres.

=== 78th Fighter Wing (Air Defense) ===
In 1956, it was decided to elevate the operational units at Hamilton back to a Wing level, and the 566th ADG was inactivated, and the 78th was redesignated as the 78th Fighter Wing (Air Defense) on 14 September, being reactivated on 18 October. The reactivated wing consisted of the 83d and 84th Fighter-Interceptor Squadrons.

==== F-86Ds ====
The 78th Fighter Wing was initially equipped with the North American F-86D interceptor version of the Sabre. Although, in reality it was a quite different aircraft than the F-86H model, the predominant version used after the Korean War. In the late 1950s, the F-86D served as the main air defense weapon against Soviet bomber attacks. In retrospect, the Soviet bomber threat was grossly exaggerated, but it cannot be denied that the presence of the F-86D interceptor was an important deterrent.

==== F-104As ====
The Lockheed F-104A had originally been scheduled to replace the North American F-100 Super Sabres of the Tactical Air Command beginning in 1956. However, by the time that the F-104A was finally ready for delivery, Air Force requirements had changed. The Starfighter's relatively low endurance and its lack of ability to carry a significant offensive weapons load made it no longer suitable for TAC. Consequently, the TAC lost all interest in the F-104A even before it was scheduled to enter service.

This might ordinarily have been the end of the line for the F-104A. However, delays in the delivery and development of the Convair F-106A Delta Dart Mach 2+ fighter-interceptor for ADC Command had at that time become worrisome, and the USAF decided to go ahead and accept the F-104As originally destined for the TAC and assign them to the ADC as a stopgap measure.

The selection of the F-104A for the ADC was sort of curious, since it had not been originally designed as an interceptor and it lacked an adequate endurance and had no all-weather capability. However, its high climb rate made it attractive to the ADC and it was hoped that the Starfighter could fill in until the F-106 became available.

First to get the F-104A was the 83rd Fighter Interceptor Squadron at Hamilton, replacing the F-86Ds and became operational with the type on 20 February 1958. In October 1958, twelve F-104As of the 83rd FIS were crated and airlifted by C-124 transport to Taiwan, where they served temporarily with the Republic of China Air Force during the Quemoy crisis. The crisis was peacefully resolved, and the aircraft were returned to the USA.

The F-104A was not very well suited for service as an interceptor. Its low range was a problem for North American air defense, and its lack of all-weather capability made it incapable of operating in conjunction with the SAGE (Semi-Automatic Ground Environment) system. The F-104As were replaced by the end of 1960 by more heavily armed all-weather McDonnell F-101B Voodoos. The F-104As were then transferred in 1960 to Air National Guard squadrons.

==== F-101B/Fs ====
With the relative failure of the F-104A in the interceptor role, the 84th FIS was re-equipped with the McDonnell F-101B Voodoo in 1959 and the 83d FIS in 1960. The F-101Bs were modified versions of the SAC F-101A nuclear attack aircraft (designed for one-way missions carrying tactical nuclear weapons) by modifying the avionics systems and fire control systems for air-to-air missiles. The last F-101Bs were delivered in March 1961, and once the teething troubles with its fire control system issues were corrected, the F-101B proved to be a quite successful interceptor. However, it was outshone by the faster and more maneuverable Convair F-106A Delta Dart when that interceptor finally entered service.

Along with the F-101Bs, the dual-seat F-101F trainer was also flown at Hamilton. F-101Fs were equipped with dual controls, but carried the same armament as the F-101B and were fully combat-capable.

==== F-106As ====
The Convair F-106A Delta Dart replaced the F-101 at Hamilton during 1968. The F-106 was considered by many as being the finest all-weather interceptor ever built. It served with the 84th FIS until 1987, nearly 20 years. On 30 September 1968, the 498th Fighter-Interceptor Squadron was transferred to Hamilton from the closing Paine AFB, Washington and was inactivated, with its F-106s being reassigned to the 84th FIS.

=== NORAD ===
On 1 April 1966, in addition to reactivating the Fourth Air Force, U.S. Air Force, the Headquarters Western NORAD Region (North American Air Defense Command) was activated at Hamilton AFB. This headquarters was not only responsible for the aerospace defense of 11 western states, but also controlled defense forces in two western Canadian provinces. NORAD was a joint U.S. Air Force/Royal Canadian Air Force (Canadian Forces after February 1968) organization. The new Western NORAD Region command combined the 25th, 26th and 27th NORAD Divisions, which were headquartered at McChord AFB Washington, Corvallis Oregon, and Luke AFB Arizona, respectively. West coast radar stations were under the command of headquarters at Hamilton AFB. Data was fed to the NORAD SAGE Combat Center (SCC-5) blockhouse at HAFB via the Semi Automatic Ground Environment (SAGE) system. The SAGE Combat Center utilized a three-string AN/GSA-51 computer system. Headquarters Western NORAD Region was inactivated at Hamilton Air Force Base on 31 December 1969.

=== 1st Fighter Wing (Air Defense) ===
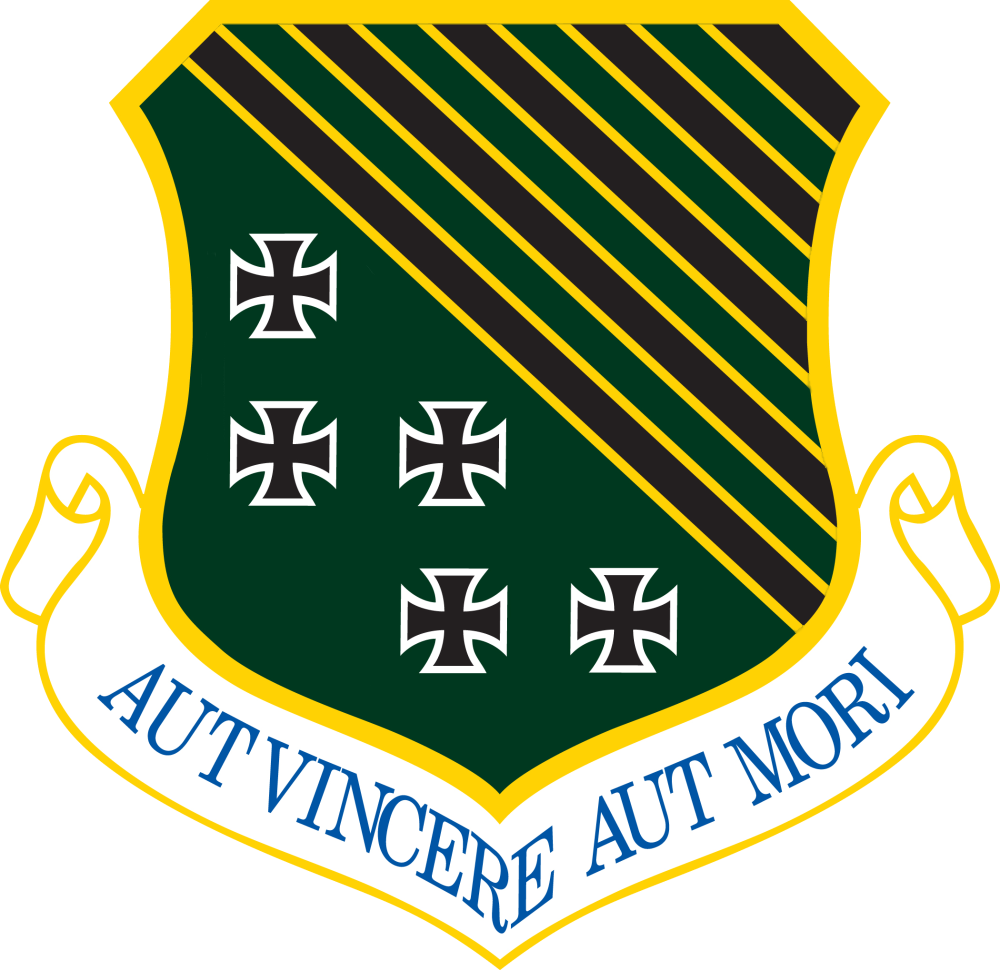

On 31 December 1969, the 1st Fighter Wing (Air Defense) was reassigned from Selfridge AFB, Michigan as a result of the transition of Selfridge to an Air National Guard base, replacing the 78th Fighter-Interceptor Wing which was inactivated. Its operational squadron was the 84th Fighter Interceptor Squadron which was reassigned from the inactivating 78th FIW. The 84th FIS continued to fly the F-106.

At Hamilton the 1st FW was an administrative organization of the ADC 26th Air Division. Although an Air Defense Command wing since the founding of ADC in 1946, the 1st Fighter Wing had long and deep traditions as a Tactical Air organization since its World War I origin in 1918. As the Vietnam War wound down, Headquarters Tactical Air Command was directed to preserve the lineage of many units which had command-controlled designations that gave them no history or traditions. HQ ADC transferred the 1st FW without personnel or equipment to TAC on 1 October 1970 to replace and absorb all assets of the 15th Tactical Fighter Wing at MacDill Air Force Base, Florida.

=== 26th Air Division (ADC/ADTAC) ===
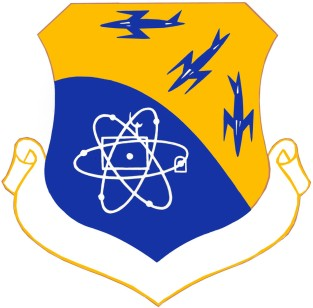

With the transfer of the 1st FW, the 84th FIS continued to operate at Hamilton until 30 August 1973 directly under the Aerospace Defense Commands 26th Air Division.

The 84th FIS was reassigned to Castle Air Force Base near Merced, California on 1 September 1973, as part of Hamilton's post-Vietnam drawdown, transferring its F-106s and effectively ending the air defense role of Hamilton AFB.

At Castle, the 84th FIS continued to fill the Air Defense role throughout the 1970s, eventually retiring its F-106s in 1981. The squadron was redesignated the 84th Fighter Interceptor Training Squadron on 1 July 1981, flying T-33s as its primary aircraft for live electronic counter-countermeasures (ECCM) training. Participated in live flying exercises as targets for various Tactical Air Command ADTAC air divisions and for the F-15s of the 49th TFW at Holloman AFB, New Mexico. The 84th FITS also flew target missions for the weapons controller training program.

The 84th FITS was inactivated on 27 February 1987.

=== United States Air Force Reserve Units ===
==== 349th Military Airlift Wing ====
Along with its air defense mission, Hamilton AFB was Headquarters for the 349th Military Airlift Wing, an Air Force Reserve unit which was activated on 10 May 1949, and operated at Hamilton through 25 July 1969 with the exception of a brief period during 1951/52. The wing was assigned to Continental Air Command (ConAC), however when activated the wing was allocated to Military Air Transport Service/Military Airlift Command.

The 349th was bestowed the history and lineage of the World War II 349th Troop Carrier Group, which had been part of the Ninth Air Force IX Troop Carrier Command in Europe. Units attached to the 349th MAW (under various designations) were the 349th Troop Carrier Group, Medium (27 June 1949 – 2 April 1951) and 310th, 311th, 312th and 313th Troop Carrier Squadrons. It was known as the "Golden Gate Wing" and flew the Curtiss-Wright C-46 Commando. During the Korean War, the reserve personnel of the 349th were called to active duty and used as fillers in other wings that were not up to combat strength. Consequently, the 349th TCW was inactivated on 2 April 1951.

==== 349th Fighter-Bomber Wing ====
With the reconstruction of reserve forces on 26 May 1952, the unit was reorganized as a Tactical Air Command fighter-bomber wing and it was reactivated on 13 June as the 349th Fighter-Bomber Wing. Its operational squadrons were the 310th, 312th, 313th, 313th and 8649th squadrons (20 August 1954 – 6 February 1956). As a tactical fighter-bomber wing, the 349th flew the North American F-51 Mustang (1952–1954), Lockheed F-80 Shooting Star (1952–1956), and the Republic F-84 Thunderstreak (1956–1957).

==== 349th Troop Carrier/Military Airlift Wing ====
In September 1957, the unit was redesignated as the 349th Troop Carrier Wing, Medium, with the following squadrons: (97th, 312th, 313th, 314th Troop Carrier Squadrons) and assigned to Tactical Air Command.

The 349th flew the Fairchild C-119 Flying Boxcar. The wing was ordered to active service on 28 October 1962, during the Cuban Missile Crisis. The 349th, like the other reserve troop carrier wings, was completely equipped and ready to move with only a few hours notice as was the case during the Cuban call-up. Only four hours after the first call to report for duty was made, 95 percent of the wing's flying personnel had checked in and were ready to move. With the cessation of the crisis, the wing was relieved from active duty on 28 November.

The 349th was redesignated the 349th Military Airlift Wing on 1 June 1966, when the unit was reallocated to Military Airlift Command. The Wing controlled four (921st, 938th, 939th and 941st) airlift groups.

The unit flew the Douglas C-124 Globemaster II. A recall to active duty was again initiated on 26 January 1968, in response to the seizure of the USS Pueblo by North Korea. During the Vietnam War, the wing airlifted many thousands of tons of cargo across the Pacific to support U.S. forces throughout the Southeast Asia and Pacific theaters of operations, as well as points in Europe and the Middle East.

On 25 July 1969, the 349th MAW was transferred to Travis AFB.

==== 452d Military/Tactical Airlift Wing ====
On 1 January 1972, the Air Force reassigned the Air Force Reserve's 452d Military Airlift Wing from March AFB, California to Hamilton AFB. At Hamilton, the wing converted to C-130B Hercules on 1 April, was redesignated the 452d Tactical Airlift Wing (452 TAW). In October 1973, the 452 TAW became the "host wing" for Hamilton AFB. As a result of the base closure decision regarding Hamilton, the 452 TAW transferred back to March AFB in 1976 for redesignation as the 452nd Air Refueling Wing (452 ARW) and transition to the KC-135E Stratotanker.

== Closure ==
The active Air Force ceased its activities on the base after 1 October 1973, when the 452d was relieved of host base responsibility, with most of the flight line facilities being transferred to the U.S. Army. The National Strike Force's Pacific Strike Team of the U.S. Coast Guard took up residence in two of the historic hangars. The housing was transferred to the U.S. Navy and a 411-acre (166 ha) parcel of the base was transferred to the General Services Administration (GSA) for public sale.

The 452d TAW operated at a low level of activity until 11 January 1976, when an agreement was finally reached to close Hamilton as part of the post-Vietnam War drawdown of the military. The base was placed in a caretaker status on that date pending final disposition. A controversy then developed over future civilian use between those supporting its adaptation into a major civilian airport, those bitterly opposed to its continued use as an airfield at all, and those holding varying intermediate degrees of opinion.

From 1980 to 1983, Hamilton AFB was home to the Refugee Transit Center, an operation of the International Organization for Migration for the processing of refugees from Vietnam, Cambodia, Laos, Thailand, and Afghanistan. Three former Air Force barracks were used as temporary housing, in addition to three other smaller buildings for administration. As many as 180,000 refugees were given overnight rest at Hamilton before moving on to other parts of the country.

The GSA public sale occurred in 1985, and finally, in December 1988, the Base Realignment and Closure (BRAC) Commission recommended closure of the last 700 acres (2.8 km^{2}) of government land at what was then called Hamilton Army Airfield. In 1995, the acreage held by the Army was transferred to the New Hamilton Partnership and public/private redevelopment of the former air base commenced; the name was soon changed back to its original "Hamilton Field." As a consequence of BRAC 1993's closure decisions regarding all of the U.S. Navy's San Francisco area bases (NAS Alameda, NAS Moffett Field, Mare Island Naval Shipyard, NAVSTA Treasure Island, Hunter's Point Naval Shipyard), the Navy vacated its Hamilton housing in 1996.

=== Major commands to which assigned ===
- Headquarters, United States Army Air Corps, 12 July 1932
- GHQ Air Force, 1 March 1935
  Redesignated: Air Force Combat Command, 18 December 1940
- 4th Air Force, 7 December 1941 – 5 January 1942
- Western Defense Command, 5 January 1942
- Fourth Air Force, 18 September 1942
  IV Fighter Command
  San Francisco Fighter Wing, 1 May 1942 – 15 December 1944
- Continental Air Forces, 15 December 1944
- Air Defense Command, 21 March 1946
- Continental Air Command
  Air Defense Command (Agency), 1 December 1948 – 1 July 1950
- Air (later Aerospace) Defense Command, 1 July 1950
- Air Force Reserve, 1 October 1970 – 30 January 1976

=== Major units assigned ===
- 1st Wing
  7th Bombardment Group, 5 December 1934 – 5 November 1935; 22 May 1937 – 7 September 1940
- 9th Pursuit Wing, 18 December 1940 – 7 December 1941
  14th Pursuit (later Fighter) Group, 15 January 1941 – 10 June 1941; 7 February – 16 July 1942
  51st Pursuit (later Fighter) Group, 15 January 1941 – 20 June 1941
- 10th Pursuit Wing, 18 December 1940 – 7 December 1941
  20th Pursuit (later Fighter) Group, 10 September 1940 – 2 February 1942
  35th Pursuit (later Fighter) Group, 10 September 1940 – 5 December 1941;9 December 1941 – 12 January 1942
- 11th Pursuit Wing, 18 December 1940 – 1 June 1941
  54th Pursuit Group, 15 January – 21 May 1941
  55th Pursuit Group, 15 January – 21 May 1941
- I Tactical Air Division, 11 September 1941 – February 1942
- 4th (later Fourth) Air Force, 7 December 1941 – 5 January 1942;19 June 1946 – 1 September 1960;1 April 1966 – 30 September 1969
  4th (later IV) Bomber Command, 8 December 1941 – 9 January 1942
- Air Transport Command, West Coast Wing, 1 January 1942 – 1 June 1948
  64th Transport Group, 1 February – 18 June 1942
- 329th Fighter Group, 10–13 July 1942
- 354th Fighter Group, 10 November 1942 – 18 January 1943
- 357th Fighter Group, 1 December 1942 – 4 March 1943
- 372d Fighter Group, 28 October – 7 December 1943
- 363rd Fighter Group, 1 March – August 1943
- 367th Fighter Group, 15 July – 11 October 1943
- 369th Fighter Group, 1 August – 5 November 1943; 16–28 March 1944
- 372nd Fighter Group, 28 October – 7 December 1943
- 478rd Fighter Group, 1–12 December 1943
- 325th Fighter (later All-Weather) Group, 9 April 1947
  Established as 325th Fighter Wing, (All Weather), 9 June 1948 – 26 November 1948
  325th Fighter Group (All Weather) assigned as subordinate unit
  317th Fighter (later All-Weather) Squadron, 24 November 1947 – 26 November 1948
  318th Fighter (later All-Weather) Squadron, 2 December 1947 – 26 November 1948
- 1117th Special Air Missions Squadron, 19 July 1948 – 31 December 1951
- 78th Fighter Group, May–November 1942
  Established as 78th Fighter Wing (various designations), 16 November 1948 – 6 February 1952; 18 August 1955 – 31 December 1969
  78th Fighter Group assigned as subordinate unit
  82d Fighter Squadron (Various Designations), 24 November 1948 – 6 February 1952
  83d Fighter Squadron (Various Designations), 24 November 1948 – 27 July 1952; 18 August 1955 – 31 December 1969
  84th Fighter Squadron (Various Designations), 24 November 1948 – 31 December 1969
  Assigned to 1st Fighter Wing (Air Defense), 31 December 1969 – 1 October 1970
  Assigned to 26th Air Division, 1 October 1970 – 1 September 1973
  398th Fighter-Interceptor Squadron, 18 November 1956 – 8 February 1957
  Scheduled to receive F-104s. Before personnel or equipment were in place, unit inactivated.
  498th Fighter-Interceptor Squadron, 30 September 1968
  Immediately inactivated and personnel and equipment reassigned to the 84th FIS.
- Headquarters, Western Air Defense Force (WADF), 1 September 1949 – 1 July 1960
- 28th Air Division, 8 December 1949 – 1 April 1966
  566th Air Defense Group
  325th Fighter-Interceptor Squadron, 10 February 1954 – 18 August 1955
  496th Fighter-Interceptor Squadron, 20 March 1953 – 4 July 1954
- Headquarters Western NORAD Region, 1 April 1966 – 31 December 1969
- 1st Fighter Wing (Air Defense), 31 December 1969 – 1 October 1970

Air Force Reserve Units

- 68th Reconnaissance Group (SAC), 9 April 1947 – 27 June 1949
- 72d Reconnaissance Group (SAC), 12 July 1947 – 27 June 1949
- 329th Troop Carrier Group (MATS), 27 June 1949 – 2 April 1951
  Redesignated: 349th Fighter-Bomber Wing (TAC), 13 June 1952 – 1 September 1957
  Redesignated: 349th Military Airlift Wing (MATS/MAC), 1 September 1957 – 25 July 1969
- 452d Military Airlift Wing (MAC), 1 January 1972 – 12 January 1976
  Inactivated as host unit after 1 October 1973, although limited presence maintained until reassigned.

Source for major commands and major units assigned:

== Hamilton today ==
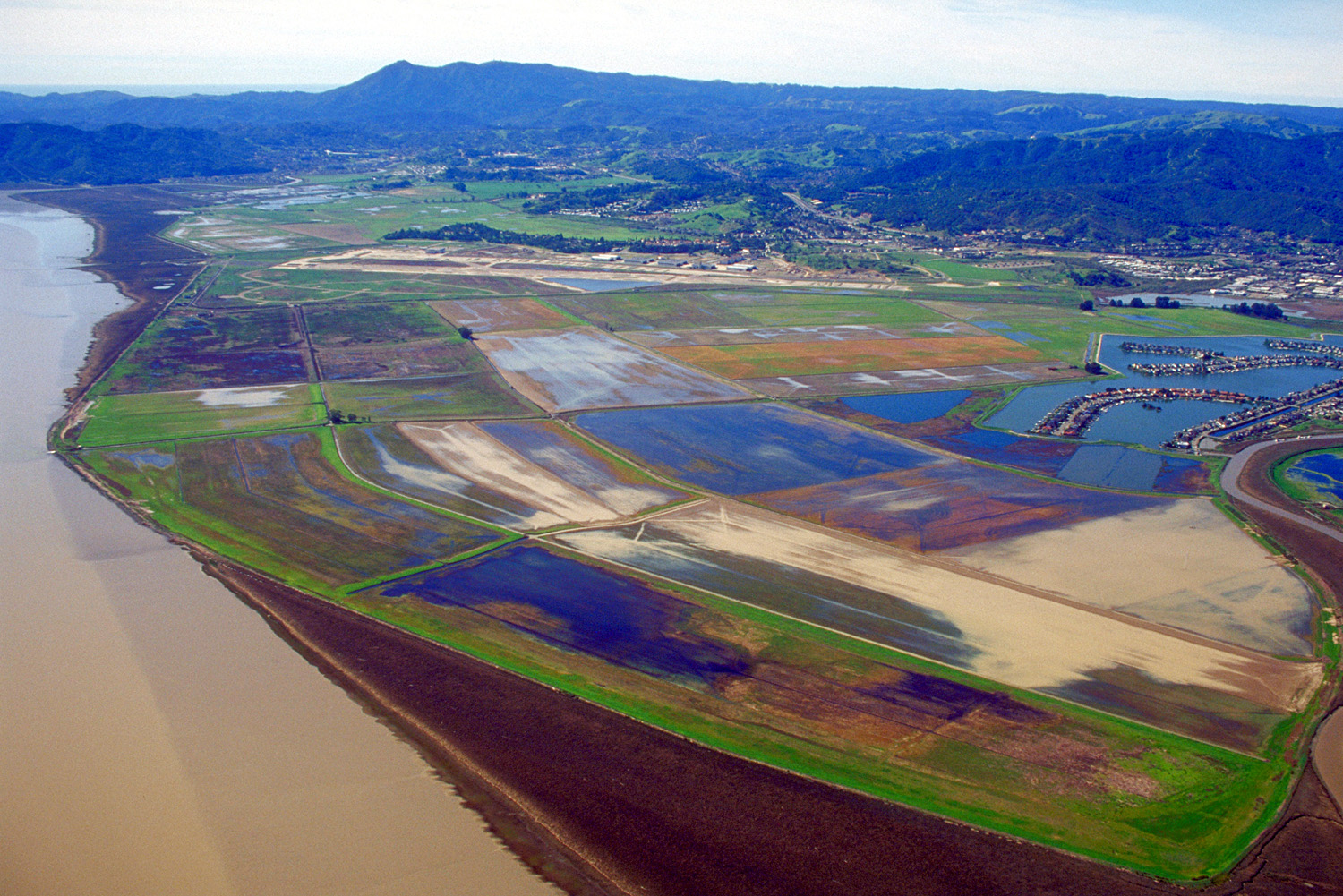
Hamilton Field and the Hamilton Wetland Restoration Project

Following its closure, many of the facilities at the airfield have been reclaimed by the city of Novato and county of Marin for public use. The airfield is also part of tidal wetland restoration effort currently underway by the U.S. Army Corps of Engineers (San Francisco District), California Coastal Conservancy, and the San Francisco Bay Conservation and Development Commission. This multi-agency construction and environmental restoration effort is called the Hamilton Wetland Restoration Project and is funded by federal, state, and regional burses.

Most non-original structures have been removed and replaced with housing subdivisions. Seven of the nine original hangars have been converted into offices, retaining their façade while being renovated on the inside. In July, 2017, a proposed tenth hangar is set to be built to match the look and feel of the original nine hangars. This part of the base is now called Hamilton Landing. Several of the original base buildings designed by Captain Howard B. Nurse, and built in the early 1930s have been renovated, including the former base headquarters, three of the large airmen's barracks, and the Firehouse. Others, such as the War Dept. Theatre, the base hospital, the Bachelor Officers' Quarters, and the Officers' Club remain intact either awaiting renovation or demolition. The Discovery Channel show MythBusters has used hangar space at Hamilton to carry out some of their experiments. Some scenes for the 1984 film Indiana Jones and the Temple of Doom were filmed at Hamilton, as were some scenes from the 1983 film The Right Stuff, and the television show Emergency! in 1978.

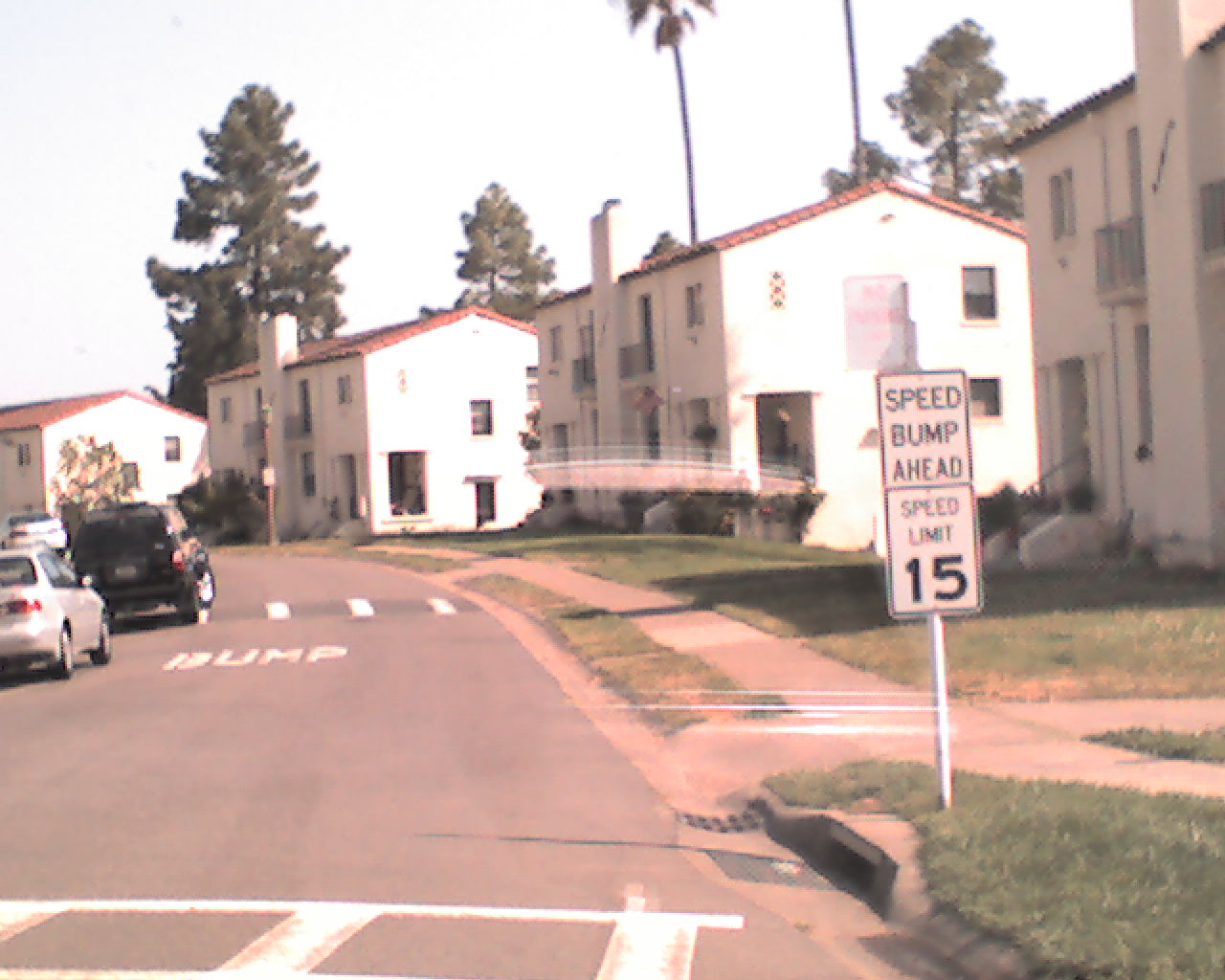
U.S. Coast Guard housing at Hamilton Field, DODHF Novato

The U.S. Coast Guard currently owns 282 Spanish-style duplexes and homes; these units were part of the old Hamilton Air Force Base housing. Due to the buildings' age, there is a need for maintenance, and many housing units are vacant, boarded up and in caretaker status. Many issues experienced with older homes (e.g. insufficient wiring and water damage) are currently experienced by Coast Guard tenants. The Coast Guard planned to sell all or most of their 50 acres of land and homes through a GSA sale in 2020. Since the Coast Guard property was not included in the base environmental studies, this area will need environmental review.

The base's environmental conditions were extensively studied as part of the redevelopment and wetlands restoration effort. Contaminated soil was removed or treated as needed. An underground methyl tert-butyl ether (MTBE) plume was discovered near the former gas stations. A small number of homes were cautioned against planting fruit trees. This plume has since dissipated and the warning is no longer in effect.

== Architectural significance ==
The base was originally built via contract awarded 5 December 1933; most of the buildings were complete by late 1934. Captain Howard B. Nurse, Construction Quartermaster, supervised the design and construction. He departed from traditional base design by rendering the buildings in the Spanish eclectic style then popular in California. Churrigueresque elements adorn the more important buildings. Reinforced concrete walls were covered in stucco to appear similar to earlier California missions; mission tile roofs topped the buildings. Recessed porches, cantilevered balconies, polychrome tile bands and wrought iron grillework complement the designs.

In 1993 and 1994, the Historic American Buildings Survey documented many of the structures within Hamilton Field, assessing each one for historic value.

== Gallery ==
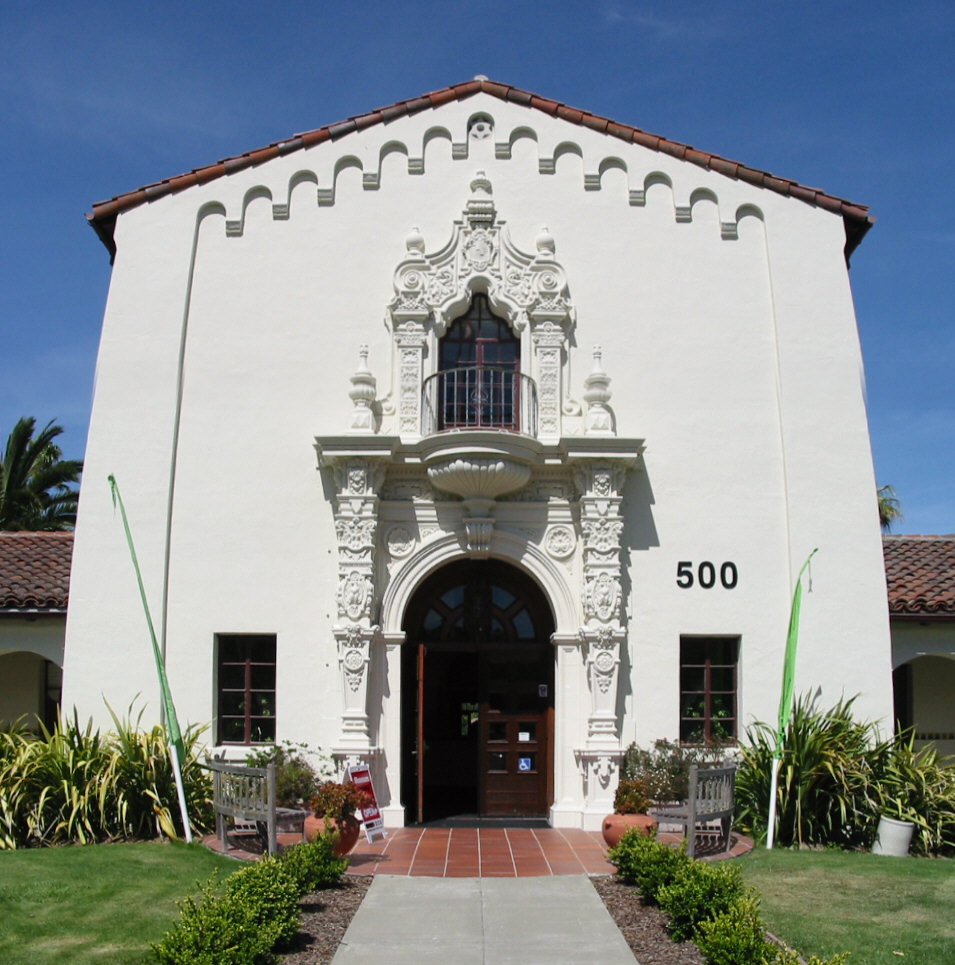
Headquarters main entrance in 2008

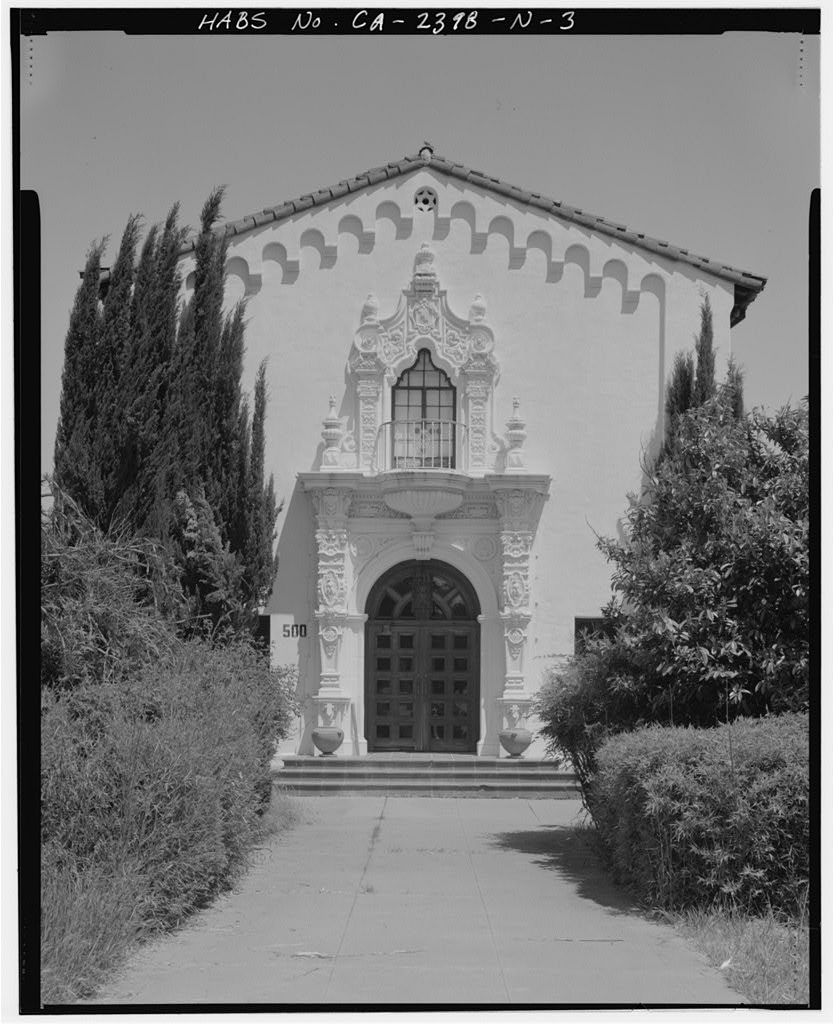
Headquarters main entrance in 1993

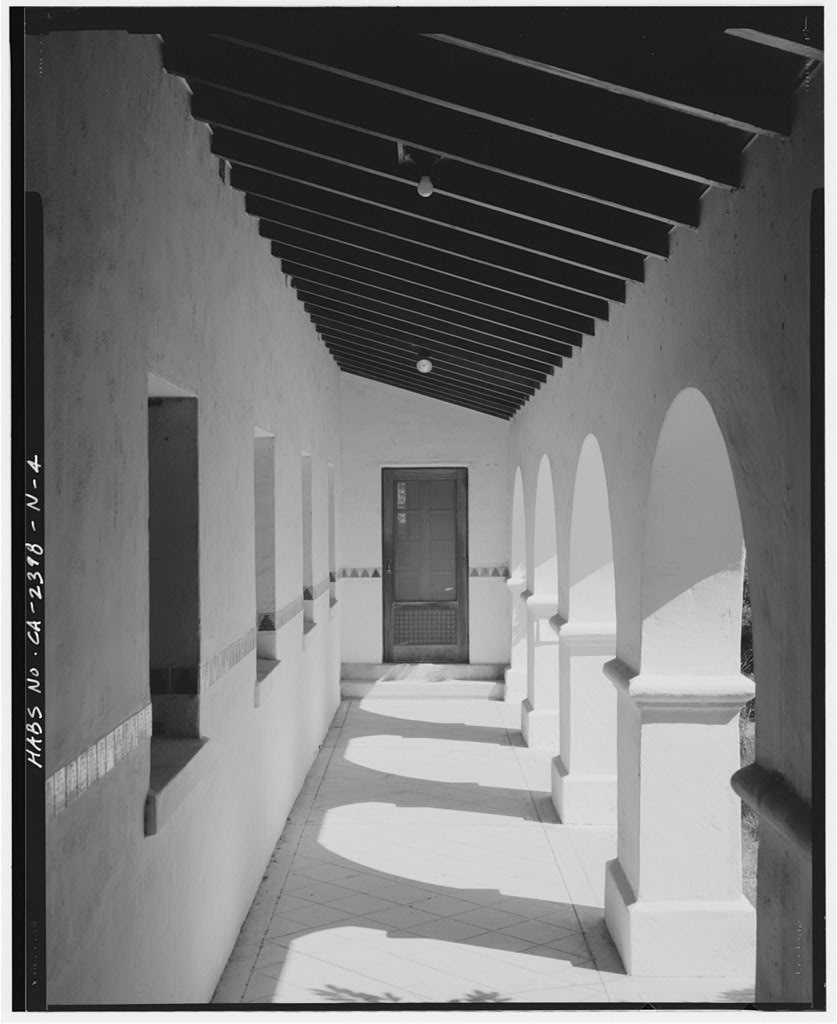
Headquarters exterior arcade with polychrome tile band

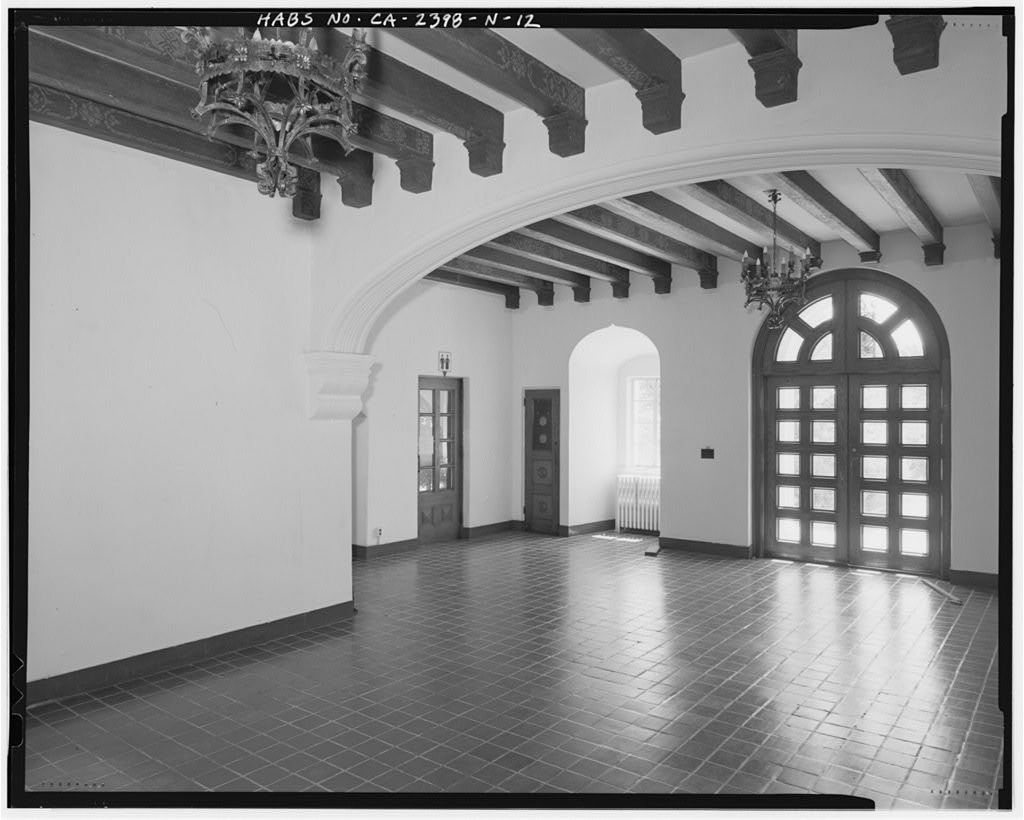
Headquarters interior entrance and phone booth

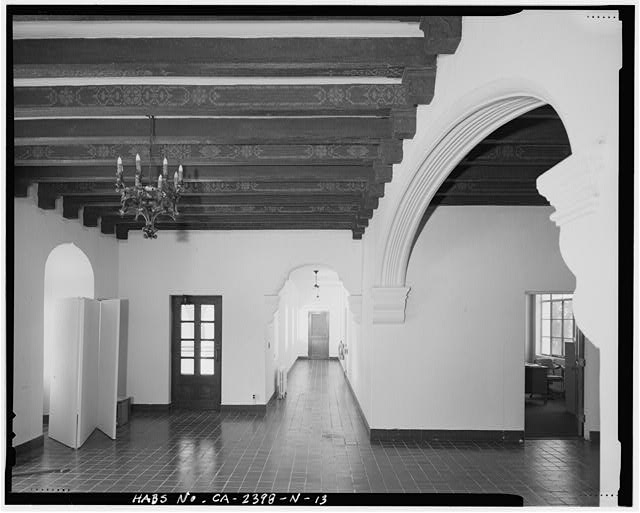
Headquarters lobby side view

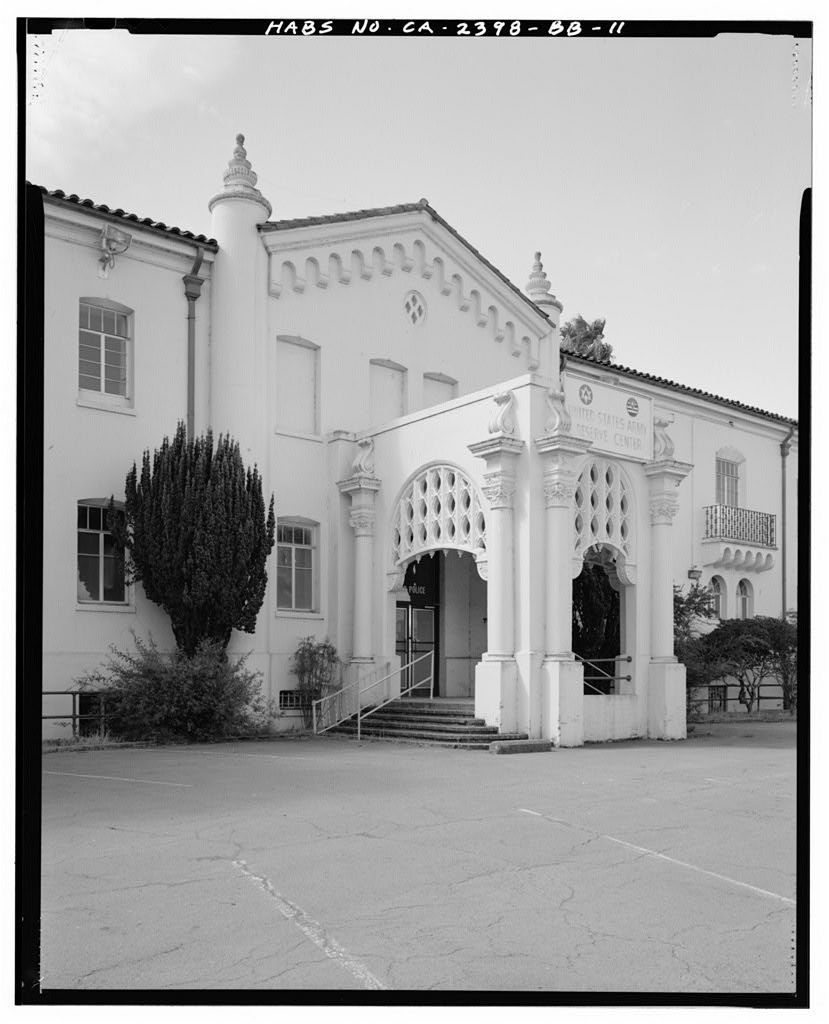
Hospital building in the Spanish Revival style

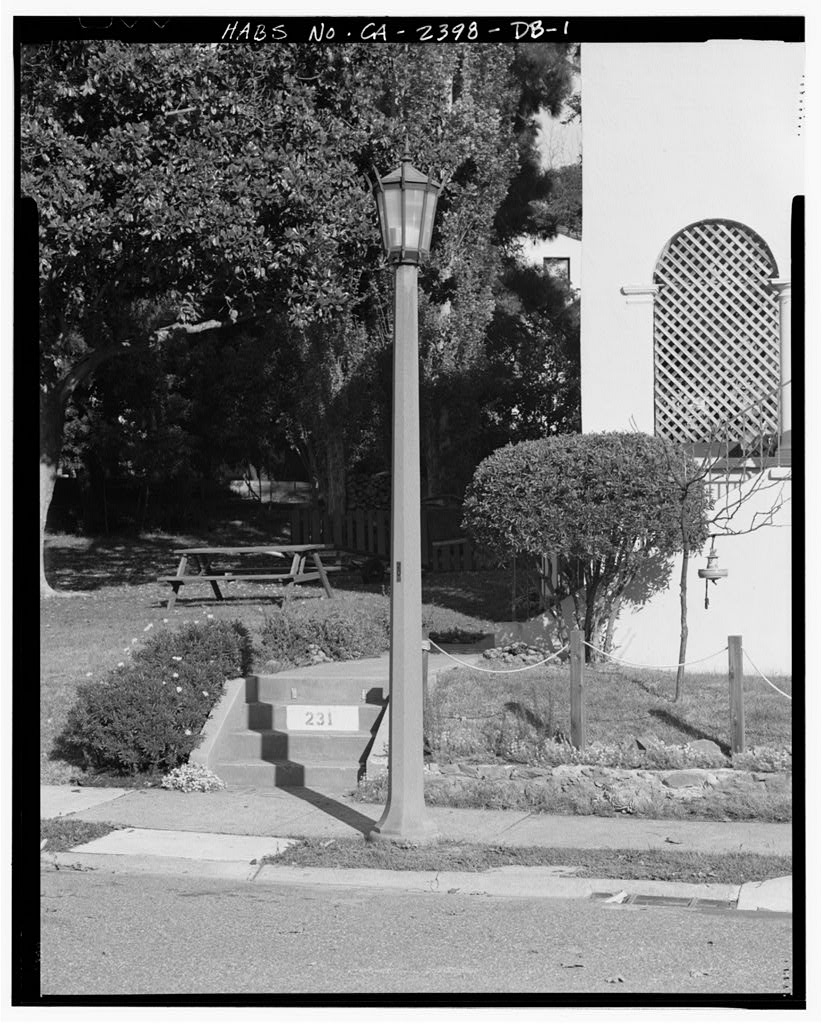
Street lamps are octagonal ornamental metal housings atop hexagonal cast red concrete with granite aggregate columns

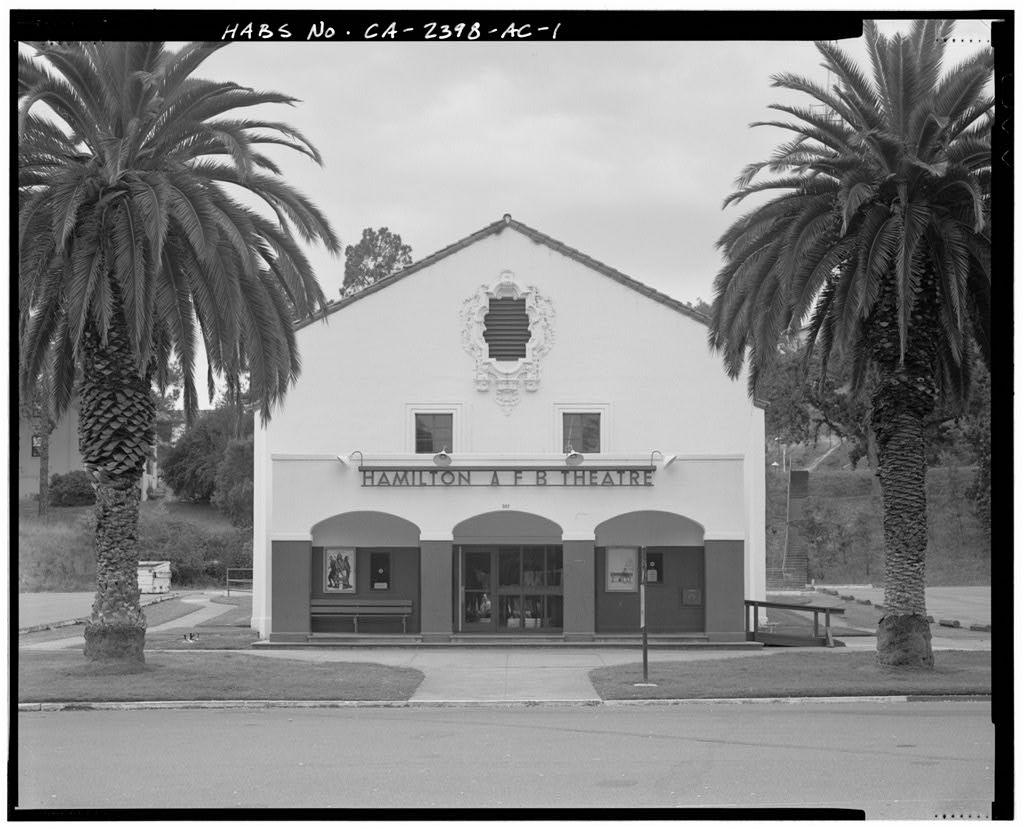
Theatre building with cast-in-place Churrigueresque concrete medallion serving as attic vent

== See also ==
- California World War II Army Airfields
- Air Transport Command (World War II)
- San Pablo Bay topics
