= List of bicycle- and human-powered vehicle museums =

Bicycle and human powered vehicle museums by country.

== Australia ==
- The Canberra Bicycle Museum – Dickson, Canberra closed in 2010. Much of the collection was purchased by avid collector James Macdonald (dec) of Toowoomba. The collection is now on display at the Highfields Pioneer Village in Highfields QLD.

== Austria ==
- Fahrradmuseum Retz, Retz, Hollabrunn district, Lower Austria

== Belgium ==
- The Wieler Museum Roeselare

== Brazil ==
- The Bicycle Joinville Museum, Joinville, Santa Catarina

== Canada ==
- The Bicycle Forest, Waterloo, Ontario
- Canada Science and Technology Museum, Ottawa, Ontario
- Huron Bicycle Museum, Kincardine, Ontario

== China ==
- Sanmu Bicycle Museum, Lanzhou, Gansu

== Denmark ==
- Danmarks Cykelmuseet

== Estonia ==
- Estonian Bicycle Museum

== France ==
- Musée de la Moto et du Vélo - Collection Maurice Chapleur, Amnéville, Lorraine
- Musée du Vélo La Belle Echappée, Fresnaye-sur-Chédouet, Sarthe, Pays de la Loire, a bicycle museum dedicated to competitive cycling and the Tour de France in particular. Bicycles and jerseys of the famous riders, video displays.
- Musée du Vélocipède, Cadouin, Dordogne

== Germany ==
- Deutsches Fahrradmuseum Bad Brückenau, Bad Brückenau, Bavaria
- Fahrradmuseum & Mechanisches Museum, Plauen, Saxony
- Fahrradmuseums Hüttenheim, Willanzheim, Bavaria
- PedalWelt, Heimbuchenthal, Bavaria
- Rheinhessischen Fahrradmuseum, Gau-Algesheim, Rhenish Hesse

== Hungary ==
- 1. Magyar Kerékpármúzeum Balassagyarmat

== Japan ==
- Bicycle Museum Cycle Center, Saikai, Osaka
- Yagami Bicycle Museum, Nagoya
- Yokohama Bicycle Museum, Yokohama

== Lithuania ==
- Bicycle Museum (Šiauliai), Šiauliai

== Netherlands ==
- Velorama (Nationaal Fietsmuseum Velorama), Nijmegen, Gelderland

== New Zealand ==
- Forza Bikes

== Poland ==
- Muzeum Nietypowych Rowerów, Gołąb, Puławy County

== Portugal ==
- Museu do Ciclismo

== Taiwan ==
- Cycling Culture Museum, Taichung

== United Kingdom ==
- The National Cycle Museum – Llandrindod Wells

== United States ==
- Bicycle Heaven, Pittsburgh, PA
- Bicycle Museum of America – New Bremen, Ohio
- Brown Cycles, Grand Junction, Colorado
- Golden Oldy Cyclery & Sustainability, Golden, Colorado
- Houston Bicycle Museum, Houston, Texas(closed)
- Little Congress Bicycle Museums, Cumberland Gap, Tennessee
- Marin Museum of Bicycling, Fairfax, California, includes the Mountain Bike Hall of Fame
- The Metz Bicycle Museum, Freehold, New Jersey (closed)
- New England Muscle Bicycle Museum – Bloomfield, Connecticut (closed)
- Old Spokes Home, Burlington, Vermont
- Pedaling History Bicycle Museum, Orchard Park (closed)
- Three Oaks Bicycle Museum – Three Oaks, Michigan
- United States Bicycling Hall of Fame, Davis, California
- The Velocipede Museum – Newburgh, New York
- Lane Motor Museum Nashville, Tennessee

== See also ==
- Outline of cycling
