= Trail riding =

Traveling on trails and forest roads

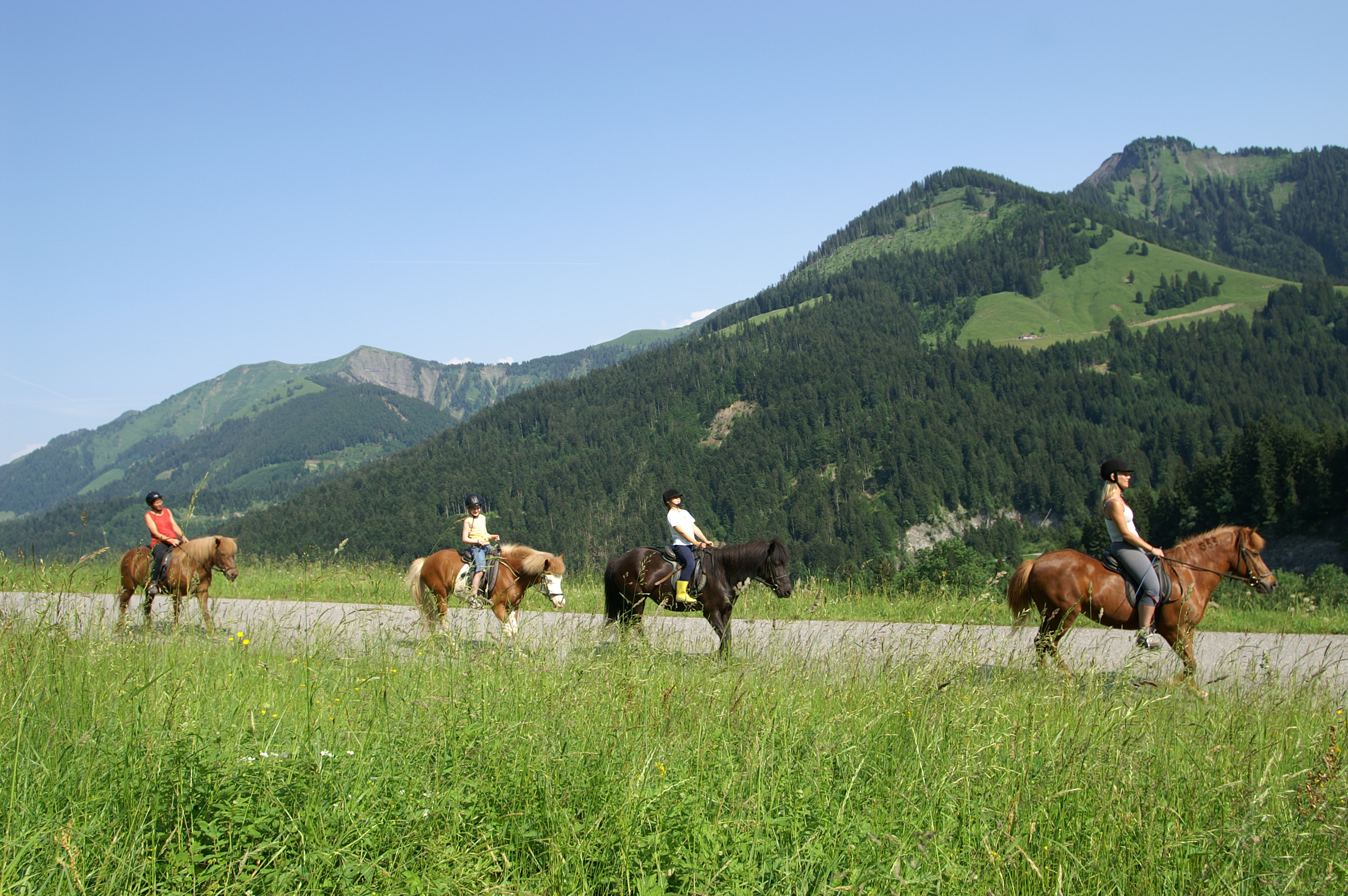
Trail riding in Dornbirn, Austria. It is often a group activity.

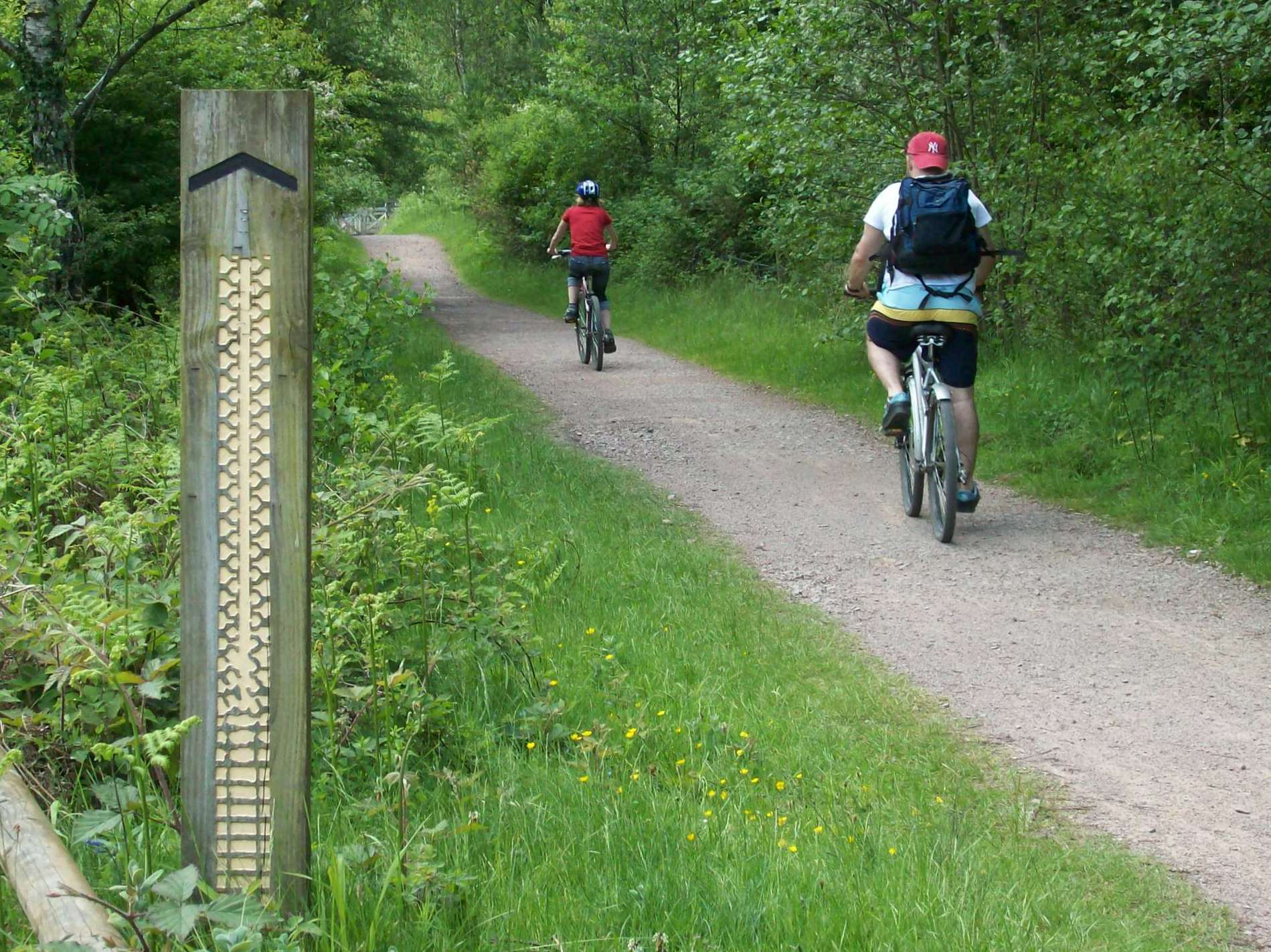
Mountain bike trail in the Forest of Dean, England

Trail riding is riding outdoors on trails, bridle paths, and forest roads, but not on roads regularly used by motorised traffic. A trail ride can be of any length, including a long distance, multi-day trip. It originated with horse riding, and in North America, the equestrian form is usually called "trail riding", or, less often "hacking". In the UK and Europe, the practice is usually called horse, pony or donkey trekking.

The modern term also encompasses mountain biking, mixed terrain cycle touring, and the use of motorcycles and other motorized all-terrain vehicles. It may be informal activities of an individual or small group, or larger events organized by a club. Some equestrian trail rides in the USA are directed by professional guides or outfitters, particularly at guest ranches, while many equestrians who own horses trail ride on their own in local, state, and national trail systems. In some parts of the world, trail riding (of whatever kind) is limited by law to recognized, and sometimes function-specific, trails that are waymarked. In other towns, trails may be less maintained and more natural. Certain trails are limited by trail use types. Trail riding can be combined with other activities, such as camping, hunting, fishing, orienteering and backpacking.

== Types and uses of trails ==
Often, horses under saddle are subject to the same regulations as pedestrians or hikers where those requirements differ from those for cyclists. In most states, are not classified livestock and thus restricted from areas such as the right of way of the interstate highway system, though generally permitted to travel along the side of other roadways, especially in rural areas.

Rail trails, which are redeveloped disused railways converted into multi-use trails, often provide invaluable trail riding areas in many parts of the world. A bridle path, also called a bridleway, equestrian trail, horse riding path, bridle road, or horse trail, is a trail or a thoroughfare that is used by people riding on horses, though such trails often now serve a wider range of users, including equestrians, hikers, and cyclists. Such paths are either impassable for motorized vehicles, or vehicles are banned. The laws relating to allowable uses vary from country to country.

In England and Wales a bridle path now refers to a route which can be legally used by horse riders in addition to walkers, and since 1968, by cyclists but not motor-cyclists. In the US, the term bridle path is used colloquially for trails or paths used primarily for people making day treks on horses, and used primarily on the east coast, whereas out west the equivalent term is simply trail. The United States has few if any formal designations for bridle paths, though horses are generally allowed on most state and federal trails, roads and public routes except where specifically restricted, although rules differ among locations.

There is some criticism of trail riding when excess or improper use of trails may lead to erosion, the spread of invasive plants, conflict with hikers, or harassment of wildlife. Off-road or trail activity is usually not permitted, as such activity may also raise the risk of soil erosion, spread weeds, and cause other damage. However, many responsible equestrians, mountain bikers, and off-road motorcyclists, especially those who get involved in these sports by joining an organized club, perform hours of trail maintenance every year. Many organizations also sponsor educational events to teach newcomers about safety, responsible land stewardship and how to improve riding techniques.

== Equestrian use ==
Many long-distance trails throughout the world have sections suitable for horse riding, some suitable throughout their length, and some have been developed primarily for horse riding. Within the United States National Trail Classification System, equestrian trails include simple day-use bridle paths and others built to accommodate long strings of pack animals on journeys lasting many days. Some trails managed by the U. S. Forest Service and other governmental entities may restrict access of horses, or restrict access during certain times of the year. Access to trails and pathways on private land is generally left to the discretion of the landowner, subject to the general trespass laws of each of the 50 states.

=== Pleasure riding ===
The term pleasure riding may encompass trail riding. This refers to a form of equestrianism that encompasses many forms of recreational riding for personal enjoyment, without any element of competition. Pleasure riding is called "hacking" in United Kingdom, and in parts of the eastern United States and Canada. In other parts of the United States, particularly the Western United States, the term trail riding is used interchangeably with pleasure riding when on natural trails or public lands. African American communities in some rural parts of the Southern United States and South Central United States have a tradition of Black trail rides that often involve music, dancing, and shared meals along with horse riding.

Many horses are suitable for pleasure riding, including grade horses and other animals of ordinary quality and good disposition. Such horses are sometimes called hacks, particularly in those areas where pleasure riding is known as hacking. In recreational trail riding, having fun and enjoying time spent in natures rather than speed and form are the goals.

=== Equestrian competition ===
There are competitive events that occur on natural trails to test the endurance or trail riding ability of a horse. The level of difficulty varies by distance, trail, and terrain. Endurance riding encompasses races of varying lengths, usually from 25 miles (40 km) to 100 miles (160 km), where the first horse to cross the finish line and be deemed "fit to continue" by passing a veterinary examination is the winner. Competitive trail riding is another distance competition that differs from endurance races, as the first horse to cross the line does not necessarily win, but rather the competitors are required to finish within a minimum and a maximum time with their horse in the best condition and with additional scoring for horsemanship and care of the animal.

There are competitive events at horse shows, called trail classes, which test the horse and rider's ability to handle obstacles resembling those commonly found on trails, such as opening and closing gates, crossing logs, and navigating forward, backward and to the side. There are also judged trail rides, which occur on a natural trail, but assess trail-class-style points based on the ability of the horse and rider to navigate specific natural and man-made obstacles encountered along the trail.

== Mountain biking ==
Mountain bikes are typically ridden on mountain trails, fire roads, logging roads, and other unpaved trails. These types of terrain commonly include rocks, washouts, ruts, loose sand, loose gravel, roots, and steep slopes. Mountain bikes are built to handle this terrain and the obstacles that are found in it, like logs, vertical drop offs, and small boulders. Mountain bikes, therefore, are more sturdily constructed than regular bicycles, have larger knobby tires, more powerful brakes, and the lower gear ratios needed for steep grades with poor traction.

Trail riding on a mountain bike can be:

- On steep, highly technical, constructed trails.
- On longer trails, like bridle paths, rail trails, farm and forest roads and towpaths. The South Downs Way in England and the Ohio to Erie Trail, in the USA would be examples.
- On hiking trails that can include steep mountain trails and high passes. These rides can last for days.

Off-road bicycle trails are generally function-specific and most commonly waymarked along their route. They may take the form of single routes or form part of larger complexes, known as trail centres. Off-road trails often incorporate a mix of challenging terrain, singletrack, smooth fireroads, and even paved paths. Trails with an easy or moderate technical complexity are generally deemed cross-country trails, while trails difficult even to experienced riders are more often dubbed all-mountain, freeride, or downhill. Downhilling is particularly popular at ski resorts such as Mammoth Mountain in California, USA or Whistler Blackcomb in British Columbia, Canada, where ski lifts are used to get bikes and riders to the top of the mountain.

Long rides on hiking and mountain paths have some resemblance to cycle touring but the latter usually take place on tarmac. However, Mixed Terrain Cycle-Touring, nicknamed "rough riding" in Canada and the US and "rough stuff" in Europe, is a form of trail riding, because it involves cycling over a variety of surfaces and topography, on a single route, either using a mountain bike or hybrid bike. A new style of travel called adventure cycle-touring or expedition touring involves exploring remote regions of the world on sturdy bicycles carrying lightweight gear. This type of trail riding is in fact a form of backpacking.

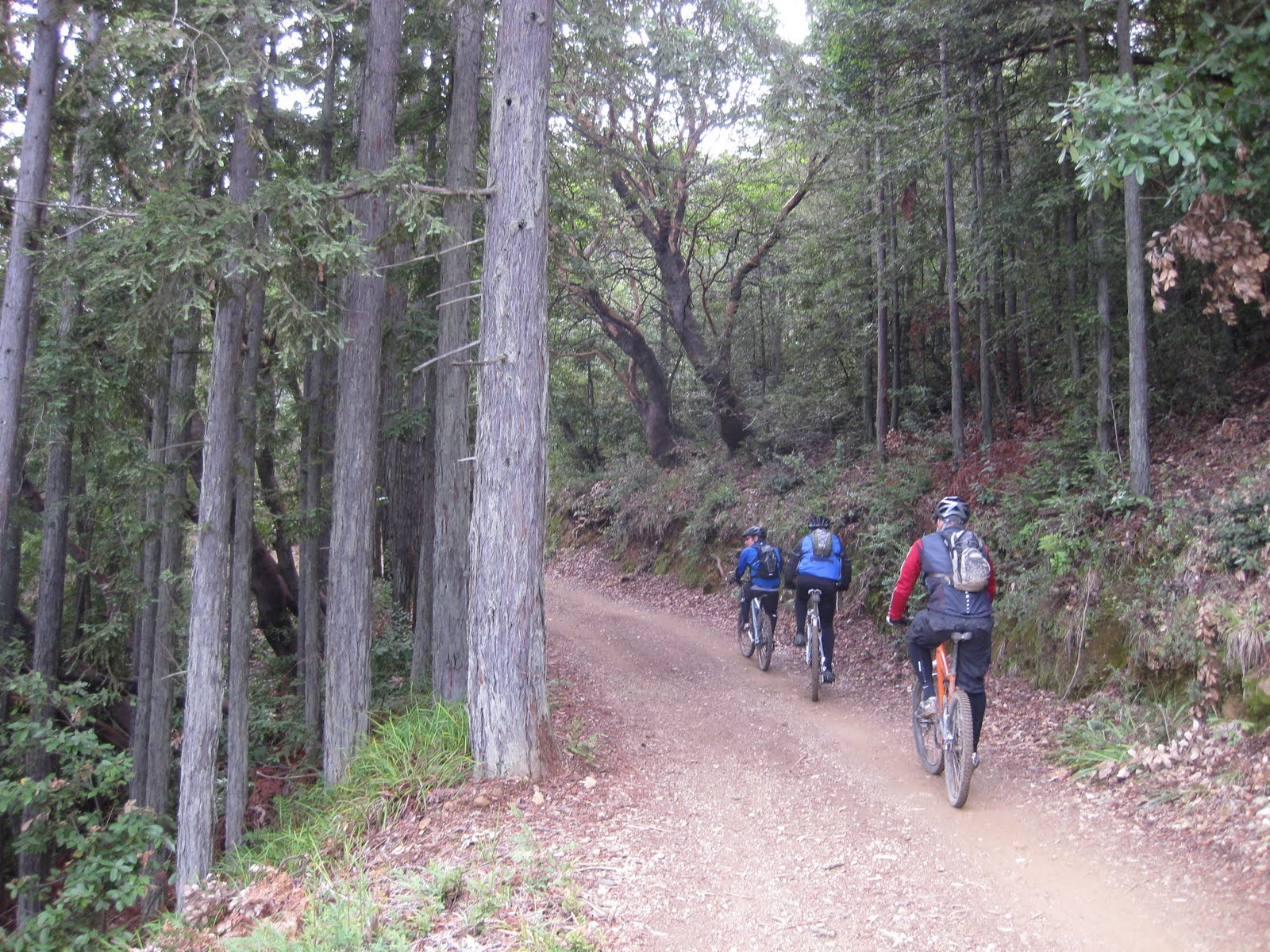
Mountain biking on Mount Tamalpais, California, USA

Mount Tamalpais, California, USA, and the surrounding areas in Marin County, California are recognized as the birthplace of mountain biking. In the 1970s, mountain biking pioneers such as Gary Fisher, Otis Guy, Charlie Kelly and Joe Breeze were active. The 2006 film Klunkers chronicled their story, solidifying Mount Tamalpais' legendary status as a trail riding destination.

There has been considerable controversy around trail access for mountain bikes, both in terms of environmental impact and the safety of other trail users. As a result, bicycles are generally restricted from narrow, single-track trails, though bicycles are allowed on most fire roads. However, mountain bikers in the United States generally have access to multi-use trails.

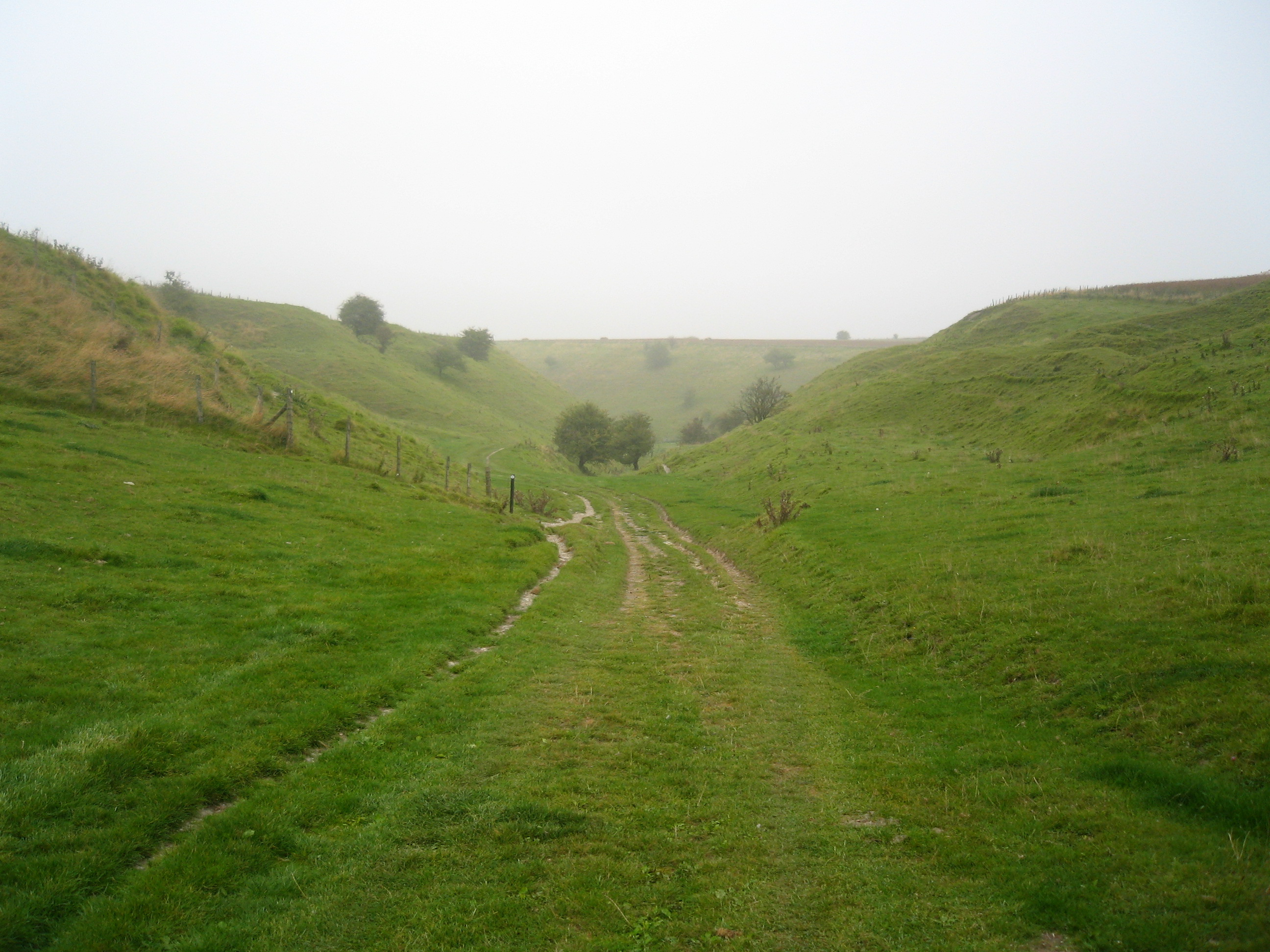
Bridle path down from the Ridgeway to Bishopstone, Salisbury, Wiltshire, England.

In England and Wales, bridle paths and some other rights of way, such as byways and 'Roads used as paths' (RUPP), are open to cyclists, but footpaths are not. However, in Scotland there is no legal distinction between footpaths and bridleways, and it is generally accepted that cyclists and horseriders may follow rights of way with suitable surfaces. Public rights of way are somewhat limited in Northern Ireland.

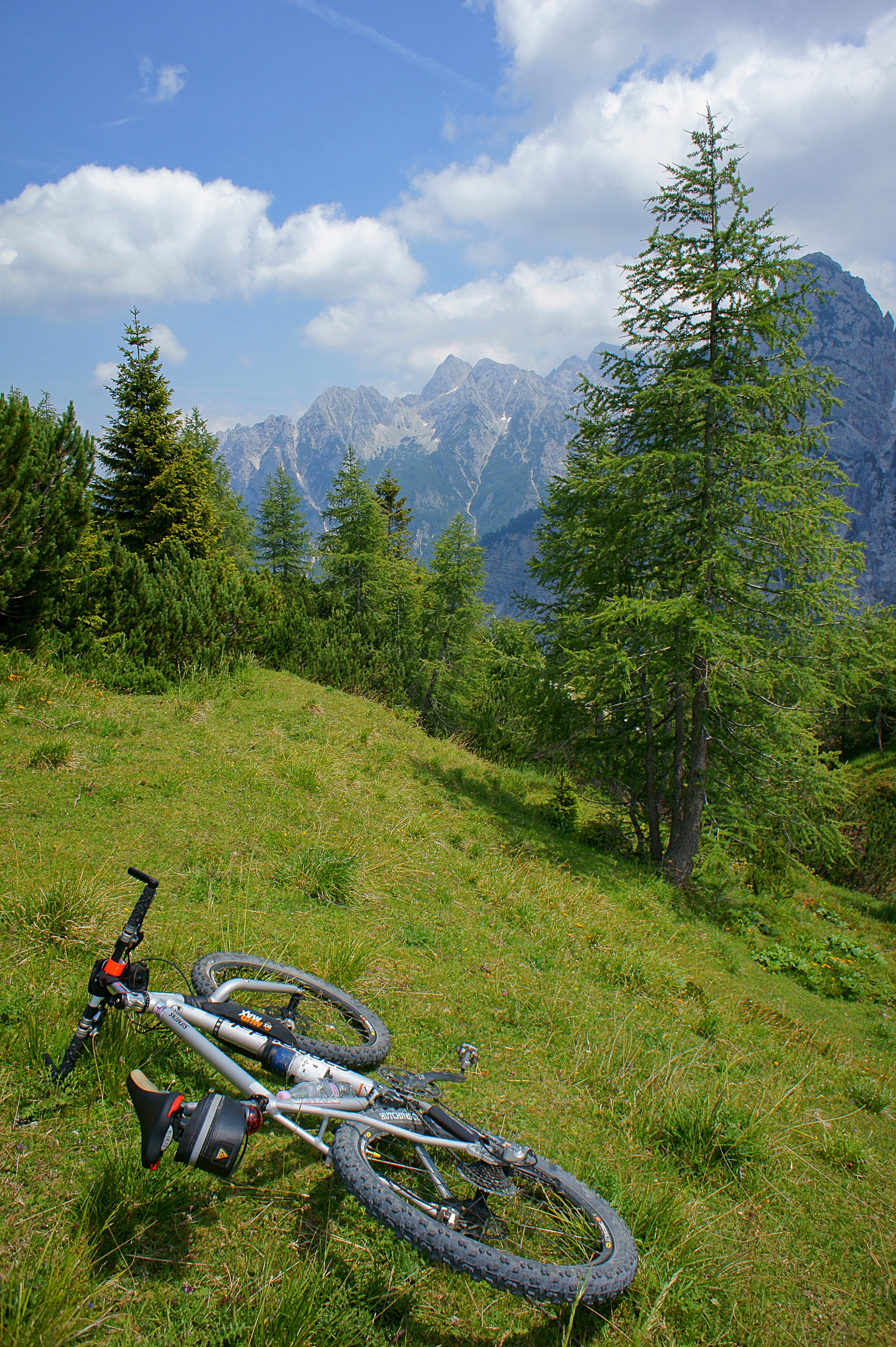
Mountain biking in the Julian Alps, Slovenia

There are long-distance routes throughout Europe, including some through the Swiss Alps that involve crossing high Alpine passes. There are also extensive routes through France that include both steep, rocky, alpine terrain and minor country roads or off-road on a variety of surfaces, from wide forest roads to narrow, muddy woodland tracks.

Extreme trail riding, such as Megavalanche are mountainbike downhill marathon style events combining gravity-assisted sections with those that emphasize the riders' levels of fitness, endurance, and nerve.

== See also ==
- Bicycle touring
- Enduro (mountain biking)
- Leisure horses
- List of mountain bike areas and trails in the United Kingdom
- Motorcycle touring
- Mountain biking in Australia
- Pleasure riding
- Single track (mountain biking)
- Trail bike
