= William Silva =

William da Silva or William Silva may refer to:

- William Silva (volleyball) (born 1954), Brazilian volleyball player
- William Fernando da Silva (born 1986), Brazilian footballer
- William Amendoim (William das Graças Silva Jr., born 1987), Brazilian footballer
- William Henrique Rodrigues da Silva, (born 1992) Brazilian footballer
- William Matheus da Silva (born 1990), Brazilian footballer
- William Soares da Silva (born 1988), Brazilian footballer, known as "Soares"
- William da Silva Barbosa (born 1978), Brazilian footballer
- William Posey Silva (1859 – 1948), American painter

Willian da Silva or Willian Silva may refer to:

- Willian Borges da Silva (born 1988), Brazilian footballer
- Willian José da Silva (born 1991), Brazilian footballer
- Willyan da Silva Barbosa (born 1994), Brazilian footballer

== See also ==
- José Willams da Silva Mendonça (born 1983), Brazilian footballer, known as "Willams"
- William de Silva (1908–1988), Ceylonese politician
- William Silvers, American painter and illustrator
- William (name)
- Silva (surname)
