= Bicycle Museum of America =

Bicycle museum in Ohio, US

Coordinates: 40.436798°N 84.380338°W

- Established: 1997
- Location: 7 West Monroe Street, New Bremen, Ohio 45869
- Type: Bicycle museum
- Collections: Historic and celebrity bicycles
- Collection size: 700 bikes (208 on display) and 10,000 other bicycle-related objects
- Founder: Jim Dicke II

The Bicycle Museum of America is a bicycle museum in New Bremen, Ohio, US. The museum is one of the largest private collections of bicycles in the world.

== History ==
The museum was founded by Jim Dicke II of Crown Equipment Corporation, the international manufacturer of powered industrial forklift trucks, also in New Bremen, who was looking for a nice attraction for the town. In 1997, Dicke acquired more than 150 bicycles and memorabilia at auction of the Schwinn Family Collection previously located at the Navy Pier in Chicago. Many other bicycles have been added to the museum over the years, but the original Schwinn family bikes form the heart of the collection.

The museum is funded by the owners, and the small admission charge is donated to a local charity.

== Exhibits ==
The museum houses antique bicycles from the 19th century, balloon tire classics of the 1940s and 1950s and banana seat high-rise handle bar bikes of the 1960s.

The museum has more bicycles than it can display at any one time in the 3-story downtown historic building, despite hanging bicycles from ceilings and mounting them on almost every wall, so the museum occasionally rotates the collection. The collection includes bicycle-related objects, such as accessories, cycling jerseys and tools from the past 140 years, and a display of hundreds of head badges from some of the thousands of bicycle manufacturers over the years.

=== Historic bicycles ===
The oldest bicycles are on the first floor. There is a replica of the earliest form of a bicycle by Karl von Drais, an 1816 wooden peddle-less walking bike. The exhibit includes several Penny-farthings, the high-wheelers, including one mounted so people can try it out. There is a 1901 ice bike, with a sled runner in front and a spiked rear wheel. Ammunition and assorted supplies are mounted on the rear rack of an 1896 Columbia Model 40 modified by the military with a machine gun mounted on it. Ignaz Schwinn's 1897 custom tandem bicycle has a seat between the riders to hold a young child.

There is a bicycle that was ridden on the circus high wire, a 1900 Dayton women's bike by Davis Sewing Machine Company, a replica of the Wright brothers' 1896 St. Clair airfoil test bicycle, and an 1896 "Zimmy" named after Arthur Augustus Zimmerman, a racing bicyclist known for his rapid pedaling speed.

=== Vintage bicycles ===
The museum has an early 1900s Harley-Davidson bicycle with a sidecar, a yellow and blue 1949 Donald Duck bike by the Shelby Cycle Company with a Donald Duck head on the front and a horn that quacks, a 1955 Huffy RadioBike which has a working radio built into the frame with volume-control and tuning dials, and a dozen colorful 1960s banana-seat Sting Rays.

=== Celebrity bicycles ===
The collection includes one of the modified 1953 Schwinn DX bikes from the 1985 film Pee-wee's Big Adventure, and four bicycles from Robin Williams' collection — a 1992 high-tech Zipp bike and a white-with-polkadots La Carrera Futura 2000. A shaft-drive Elgin proto-type that was owned by Jesse James, and a mountain bike owned by Mickey Mantle are also on display.

== See also ==
- History of cycling
- Bike boom
- Bicycle collecting
- List of bicycle- and human-powered vehicle museums
- William Luelleman House, another museum in New Bremen, Ohio
