= Auglaize Motor Car Co. =

Defunct American motor vehicle manufacturer

- Type: Truck Company
- Industry: Manufacturing
- Founded: 1911; 115 years ago
- Defunct: 1916; 110 years ago
- Headquarters: New Bremen, Ohio, US,
- Products: Trucks

The Auglaize Motor Car Co. of New Bremen, Ohio, was a truck manufacturer.

== History ==
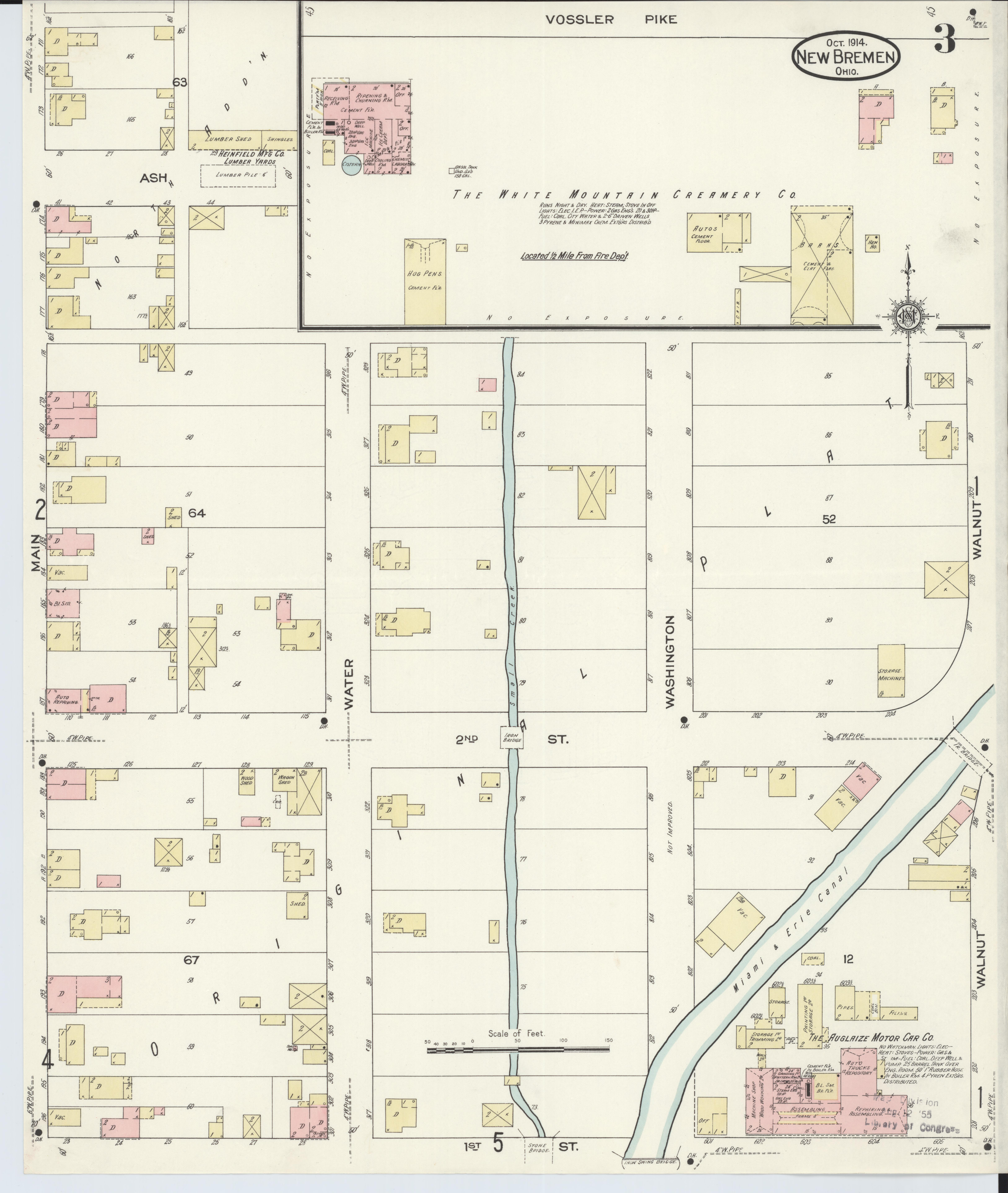
Auglaize plant (1914)

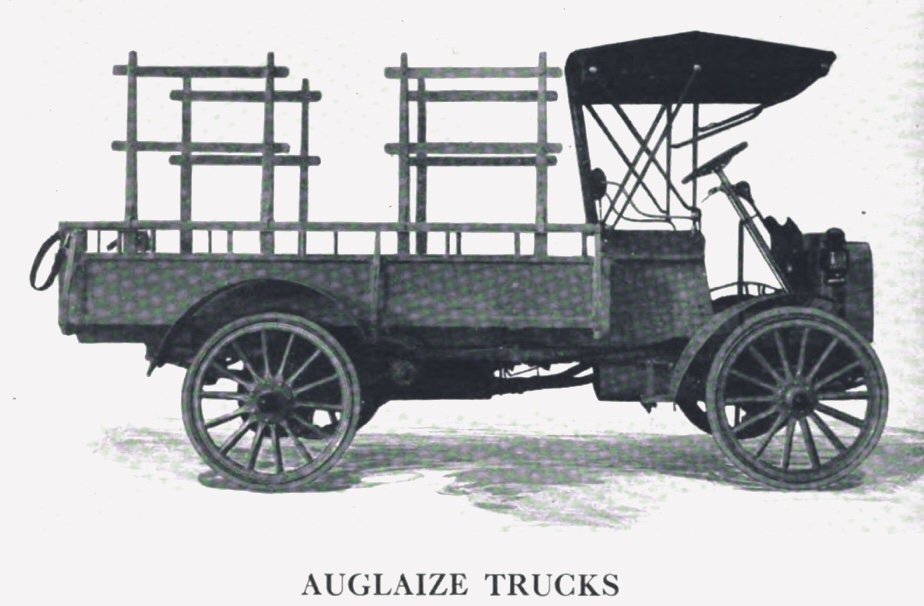
Auglaize Model D 1 t (1914)

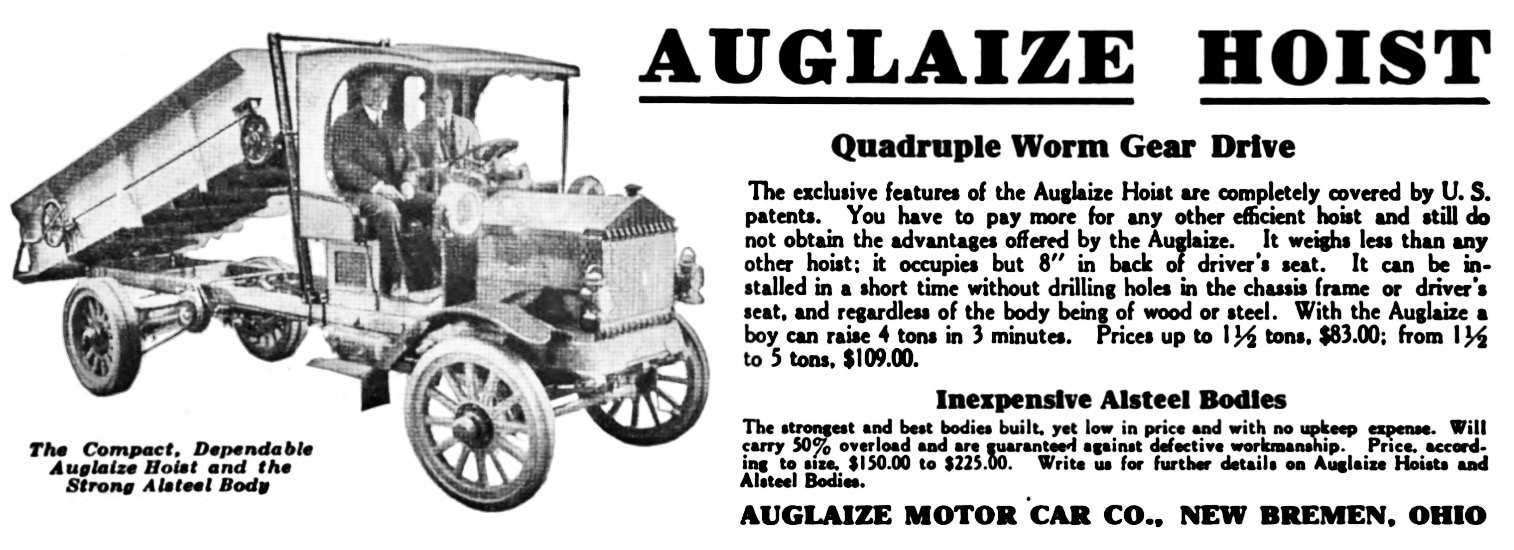
Auglaize advertisement (1918)

The company, founded 1911, in New Bremen, Ohio manufactured trucks under the brand name Auglaize. The name Auglaize is derived from the Auglaize County region or from the Auglaize River. The Kougle Auto Company, that has been engaged in a painting and repairing business at Indianapolis, Ind., has acquired the control in 1913 of the Auglaize Motor Car Company of New Bremen, Ohio, and will move the plant to Indianapolis, where the Auglaize delivery wagons will be produced under the name of the Kougle machine.

== Production Models ==
In 1914 the models

- H; 0.5 t ; 2838 cc, 133.35 mm bore; 101.6 mm stroke; 20 hp; 2540 mm wheel base; 12 m.p.h
- D 1 t; 3710 cc; 95.25 mm bore; 130.175 mm stroke; 2794 mm wheel base; 18 m.p.h.

are available.
