= Bicycle museum =

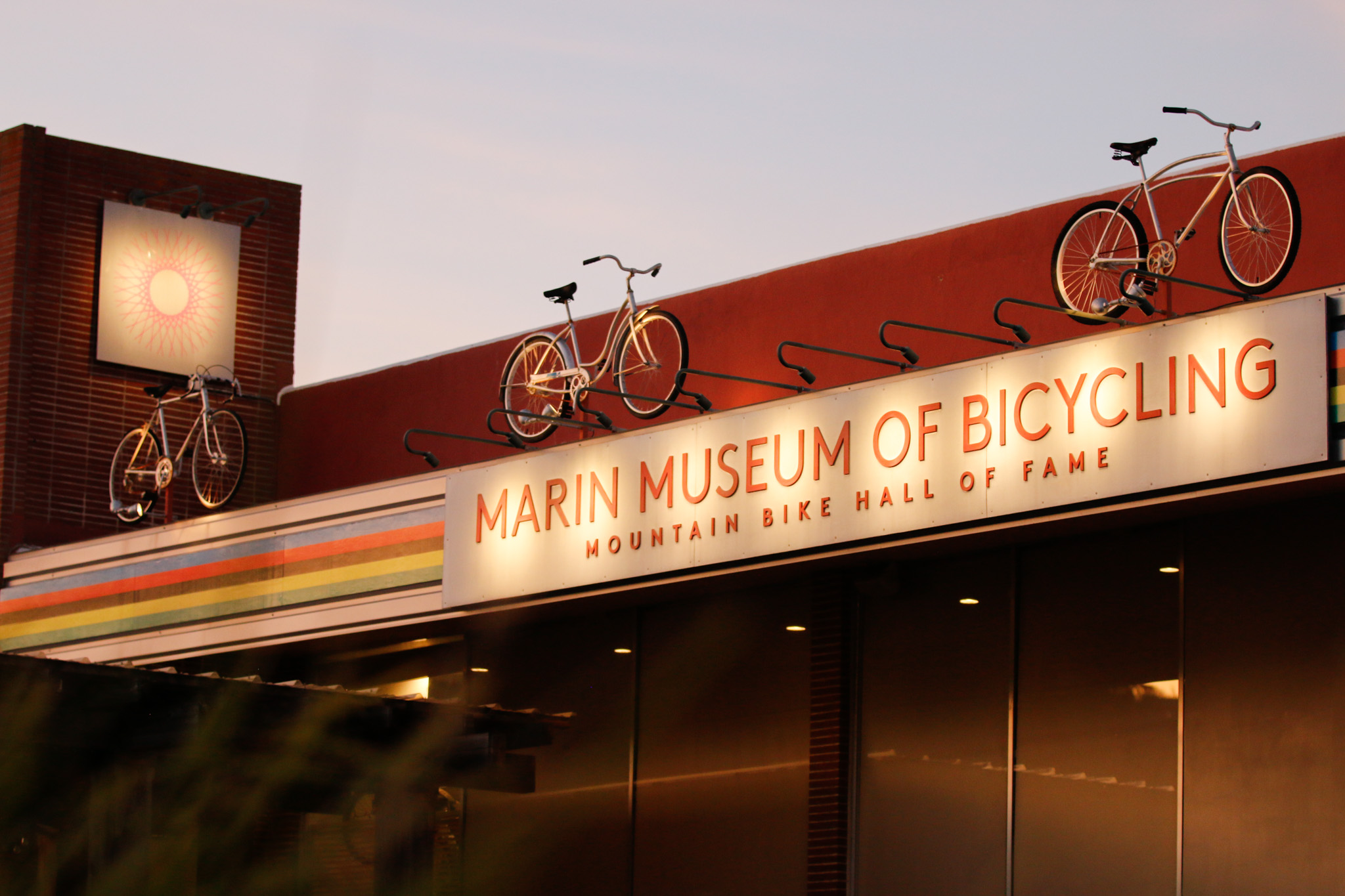
- The Marin Museum of Bicycling in Fairfax, California.

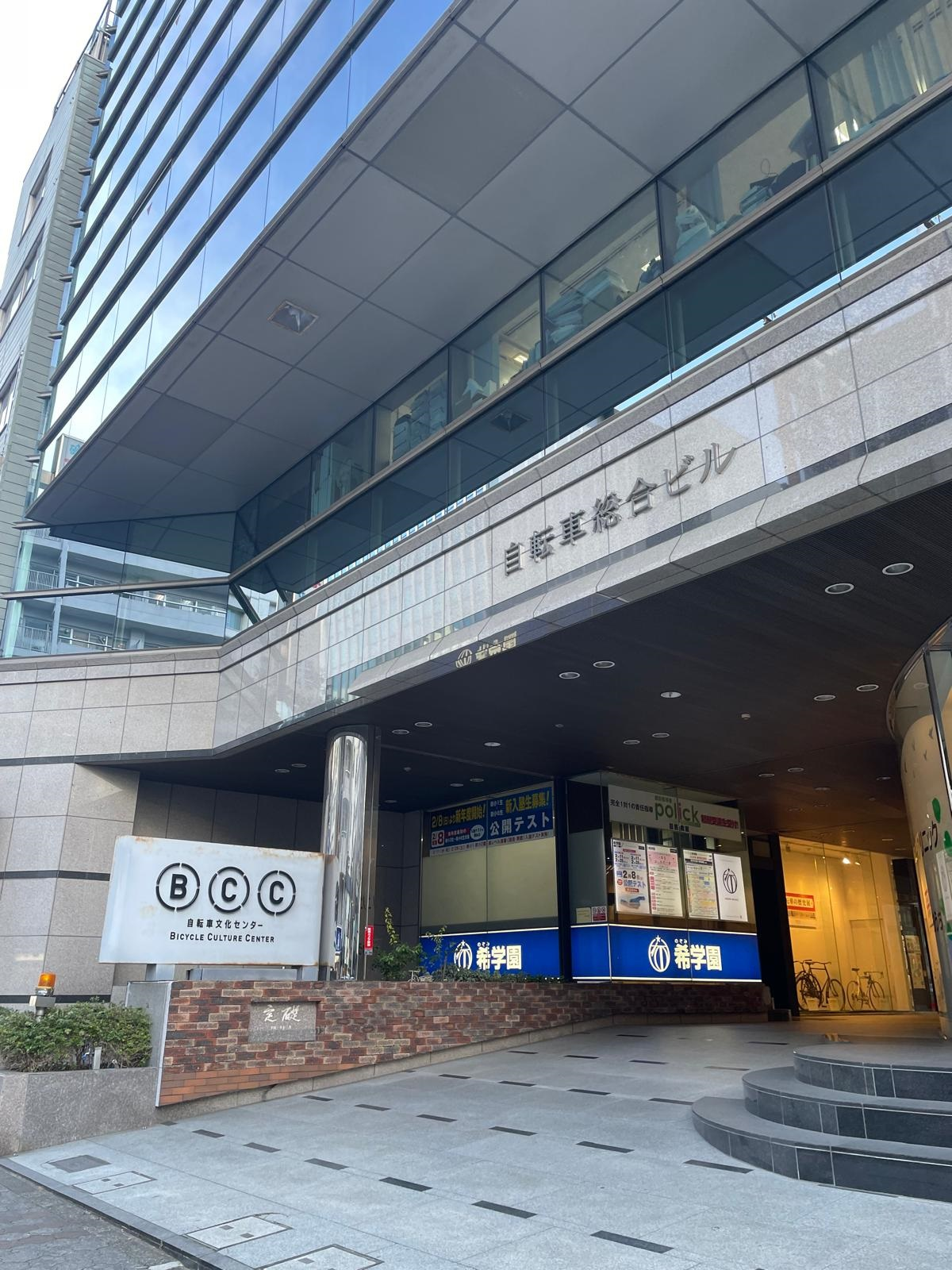
Bicycle museum in Meguro, Tokyo (2025)

A bicycle museum is an institution dedicated to preserving and showcasing the history, evolution, and cultural significance of bicycles. These museums typically feature exhibits of vintage and rare bicycles, from early wooden velocipedes to modern racing bikes. They often include displays on bicycle technology, famous cyclists, and how bicycles have influenced transportation, sport, and society. Some bicycle museums also offer interactive exhibits, restoration workshops, and guided tours.

Examples of well-known bicycle museums include:

- Bicycle Museum of America (US) – in New Bremen, Ohio – collection of 700 bicycles with 208 on display
- Madonna Del Ghisallo (Italy) – A cultural complex consisting of a chapel dedicated to the patroness of cyclist and a cycling museum overlooking Lake Como.
- Marin Museum of Bicycling (US) – A museum dedicated to the history, evolution, and culture of cycling. It is also home to the Mountain Bike Hall of Fame.
- Museum van de Wielersport (Belgium) – A museum dedicated to the history and culture of cycling, with a particular focus on Belgian competitive road racing.
- Shimano Bicycle Museum (Japan) – Highlights 200 years of innovations in cycling technology. It is funded by Shimano, the world's largest cycling components manufacturer.
- Deutsches Fahrradmuseum (Germany) – Features historic bicycles and cycling memorabilia.
- Cycling Museum of Šiauliai (Lithuania) – showcasing the historic development of bicycles with particular focus on the Soviet period and production by the Vairas factory.
