= William Luelleman House =

Historic house in Ohio, United States

- U.S. National Register of Historic Places
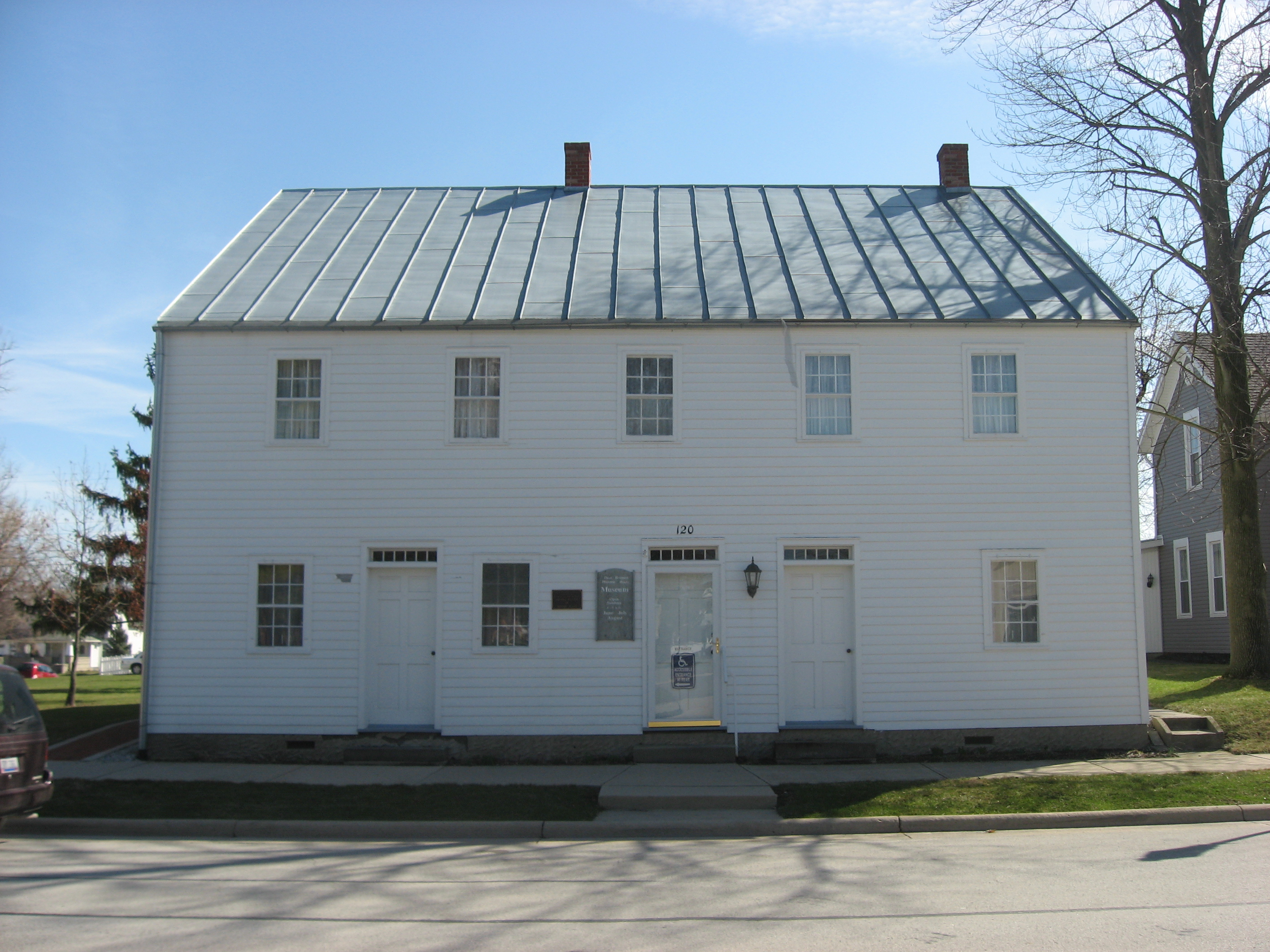
- Front of the house

- Location within Ohio Location within the United States
- Location: 120 N. Main St., New Bremen, Ohio
- Coordinates: 40°26′20″N 84°22′56″W
- Area: Less than 1 acre (0.40 ha)
- Built: 1837
- NRHP reference No.: 75001322
- Added to NRHP: May 21, 1975

The William Luelleman House (also known as the Gerhard Hehemann House) is a historic house in downtown New Bremen, Ohio, United States. Designed by an unknown architect and built in 1837, it is the oldest structure in the village, and it has been ranked as a leading example of German architecture on the American frontier. Among its leading details are the symmetry of the windows and doors of its facade, the glass transom windows above the doors, and the existence of a stoop rather than a porch at the entrance to the building.

Although the house is known primarily by Luelleman's name, it has been owned and used by a succession of individuals unrelated to Luelleman and his family. It was built for community leader Gerhard Hehemann, and in later years it was home to the village's post office, a shop, and a Dutch Reformed church. Even while it was maintained for commercial or religious purposes, parts of the house continued to be used as a residence for multiple families.

In 1975, the Luelleman House was listed on the National Register of Historic Places because of its well-preserved historic architecture. As one of the best examples of German architecture in a heavily German community, it was seen as historically significant statewide. Today, it is the location of a museum operated by the New Bremen Historic Association, which has owned the house since shortly after its establishment in 1973.

== See also ==
- Bicycle Museum of America, another museum in New Bremen
