= Sandy Piez =

American baseball player (1889–1930)

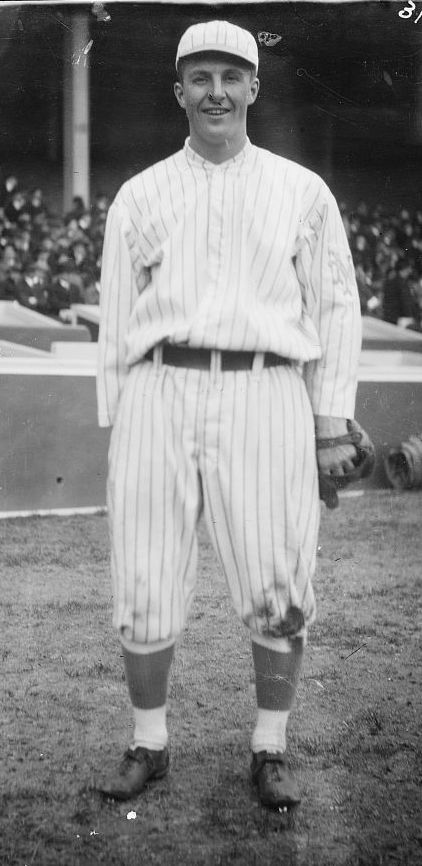
- Outfielder
- Born: October 13, 1889; New York City
- Died: December 29, 1930 (aged 41); Absecon, New Jersey
- Batted: Right Threw: Right

MLB debut
- April 17, 1914, for the New York Giants

Last MLB appearance
- October 6, 1914, for the New York Giants

MLB statistics
- Games played: 37
- At bats: 8
- Hits: 3
- Stolen bases: 4
- Stats at Baseball Reference

Teams
- New York Giants (1914)

Charles William "Sandy" Piez (October 13, 1889 – December 29, 1930) was a Major League Baseball player who played for the New York Giants in 1914. He was primarily used as a pinch runner, but also played as an outfielder. Piez died at age 41 when his car hit ice and skidded off a bridge and he drowned.
