= Mountain biking on Mount Tamalpais =

Mountain biking on a mountain in California, USA

Coordinates: 37°55′26.12″N 122°35′47.92″W

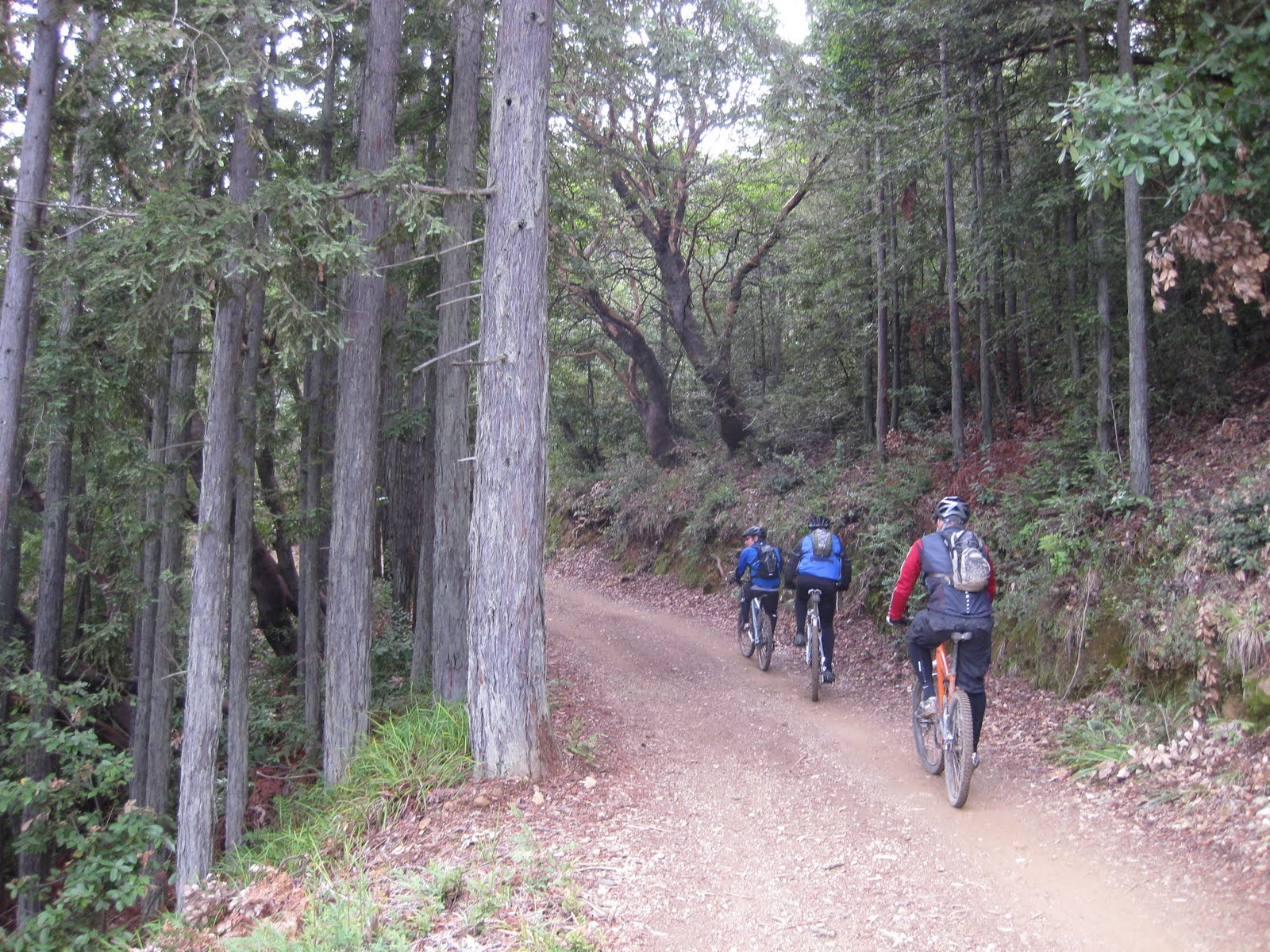
Ascending through the redwoods.

Mount Tamalpais (locally referred to as Mt. Tam) and the surrounding areas in Marin County, California are recognized as the birthplace of the modern mountain biking industry. Other Northern California hill-adjacent suburban areas had small cohorts.

== History ==
In the 1970s, mountain biking pioneers such as Gary Fisher, Otis Guy, Charlie Kelly and Joe Breeze were active. The 2006 film Klunkers chronicled their story, solidifying Mount Tamalpais' status as a mountain biking destination, as did Frank J. Berto's book The Birth of Dirt. The area is used by mountain bikers due to Mount Tamalpais’ proximity to a highly populated geographic region, ease of access, varied terrain, and views. A number of trailheads surround the mountain, and the paved and dirt fire roads that cross Mount Tamalpais and adjacent foothills provide options for people of all fitness levels. Most offroad cyclists reach Mount Tamalpais through the towns of Ross, Fairfax or Mill Valley, and the less used access points that exist through the towns of Larkspur and Kentfield. The Old Railroad Grade fire road that begins in Mill Valley, once the right-of-way of the Mount Tamalpais Scenic Railroad, is the easiest route to traverse up the mountain to its peak of 2,571 feet (784 m) at East Peak.

Like some other mountain biking areas, there has been controversy around trail access on Mount Tamalpais for mountain bikes, both in terms of environmental impact and the safety of other trail users. As a result, bicycles are generally restricted from narrow, single-track trails, though bicycles are allowed on most fire roads. However, through the growing connections of trails established by the Bay Area Ridge Trail, mountain bikers have access to multi-use trails such as the Dias Ridge Trail. In addition, the non-profit Marin County Bicycle Coalition is playing a growing role to improve access for mountain bikers to singletrack and multi-use trails by working collaboratively with the Marin Municipal Water District, which manages 18,500 acres in the Mt. Tamalpais Watershed, the Golden Gate National Recreation Area, and other organizations. Boy Scout Camp Tamarancho Trail loop and the Endor Flow Trail are singletracks by Friends Of Tamarancho.

== See also ==
- Mountain biking
- Marin Museum of Bicycling
