= Fred Brainard =

American baseball player (1892–1959)

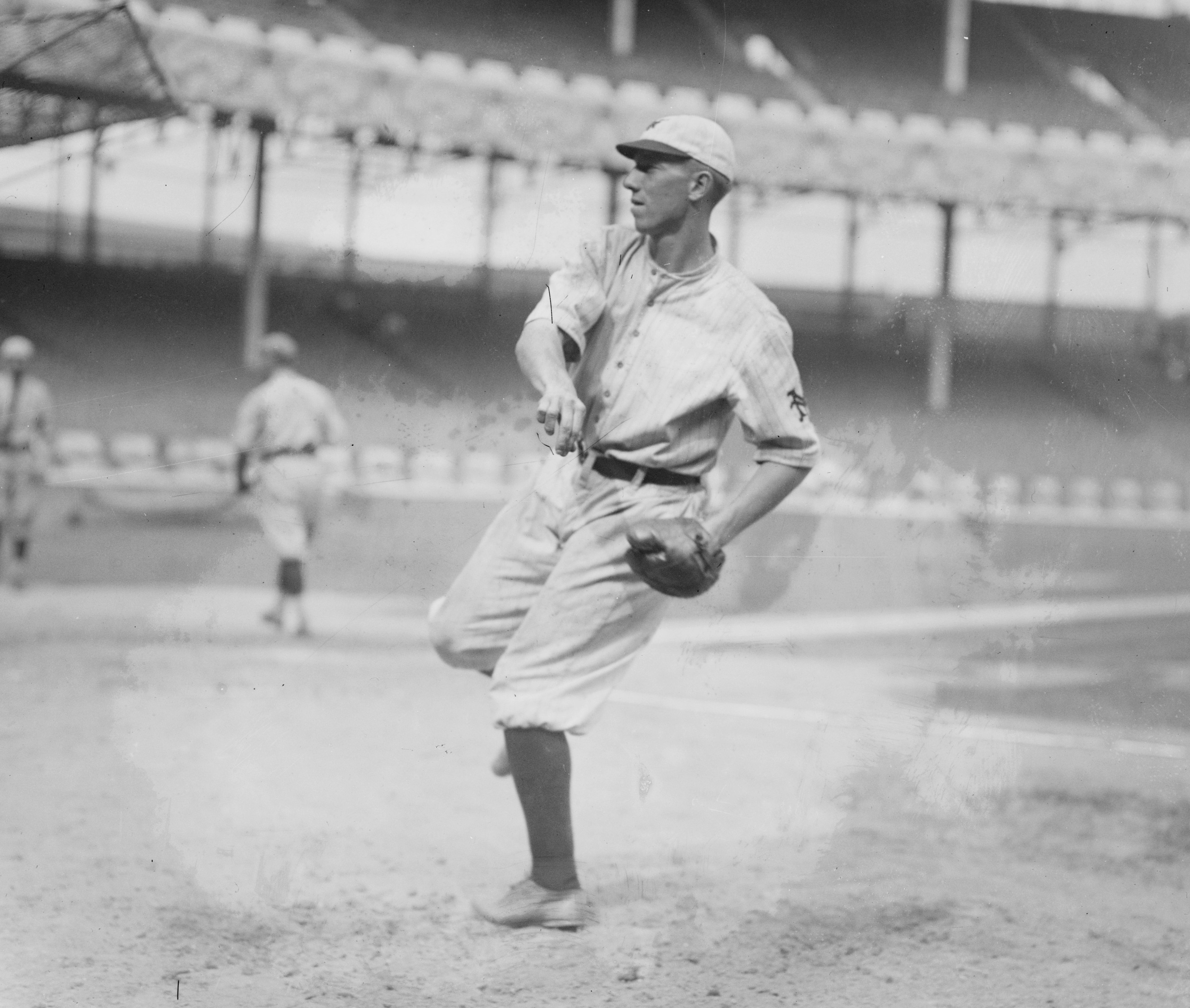
- Infielder
- Born: February 17, 1892; Champaign, Illinois, U.S.
- Died: April 17, 1959 (aged 67); Galveston, Texas, U.S.
- Batted: Right Threw: Right

MLB debut
- October 6, 1914, for the New York Giants

Last MLB appearance
- April 13, 1916, for the New York Giants

MLB statistics
- Batting average: .195
- Home runs: 1
- Runs batted in: 21
- Stats at Baseball Reference

Teams
- New York Giants (1914–1916)

Frederick F. Brainard (February 17, 1892 – April 17, 1959) was an American infielder in Major League Baseball. He played for the New York Giants between 1914–1916. He then played for various minor league teams, including a stint as player-manager of the International League Newark Bears in 1923 and 1924.
