= Al Demaree =

American baseball player (1884–1962)

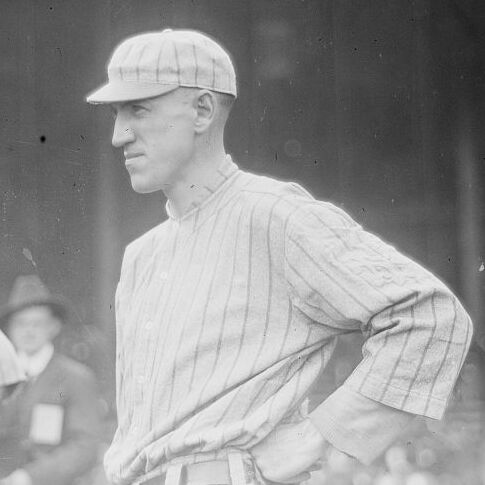
- Demaree in 1914
- Pitcher
- Born: September 8, 1884; Quincy, Illinois, U.S.
- Died: April 30, 1962 (aged 77); Los Angeles, California, U.S.
- Batted: Left Threw: Right

MLB debut
- September 26, 1912, for the New York Giants

Last MLB appearance
- September 27, 1919, for the Boston Braves

MLB statistics
- Win–loss record: 80–72
- Earned run average: 2.77
- Strikeouts: 514
- Stats at Baseball Reference

Teams
- New York Giants (1912–1914); Philadelphia Phillies (1915–1916); Chicago Cubs (1917); New York Giants (1917–1918); Boston Braves (1919)

Albert Wentworth Demaree (September 8, 1884 – April 30, 1962) was an American professional baseball pitcher, who played in Major League Baseball (MLB) for the New York Giants, Philadelphia Phillies, Chicago Cubs, and Boston Braves, from 1912 to 1919.

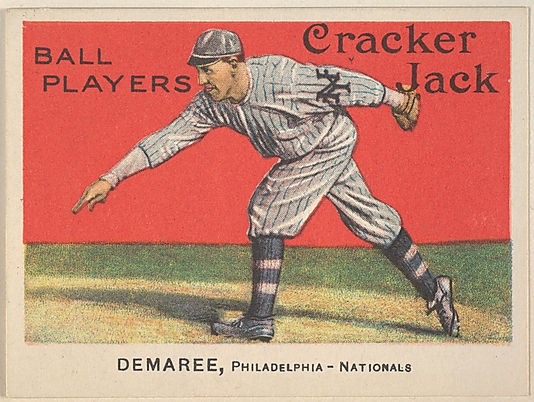
Cracker Jack card

Demaree posted an 80-72 win-loss record with a 2.77 earned run average (ERA), 514 strikeouts, and 15 shutouts in 1,424 innings pitched. Although a weak hitter, posting a .118 batting average (54-for-456), he was an above-average fielding pitcher, recording a .980 fielding percentage, committing only 7 errors in 352 total chances.

Demaree's career started in 1906 when he played semi-pro ball in Chicago while attending art school. In 1908, he moved to Montgomery to play in the Southern Association team there. In 1909, he switched to the South Atlantic League, pitching first for Savannah and then being sold to the Chattanooga Lookouts. When the Atlanta team tried to pick him up for 1910, Demaree balked at the contract being offered and announced he would resume his art career. He ended up back on the Lookouts, who traded him in 1911 to the Mobile Gulls, where he played until the New York Giants picked him up.

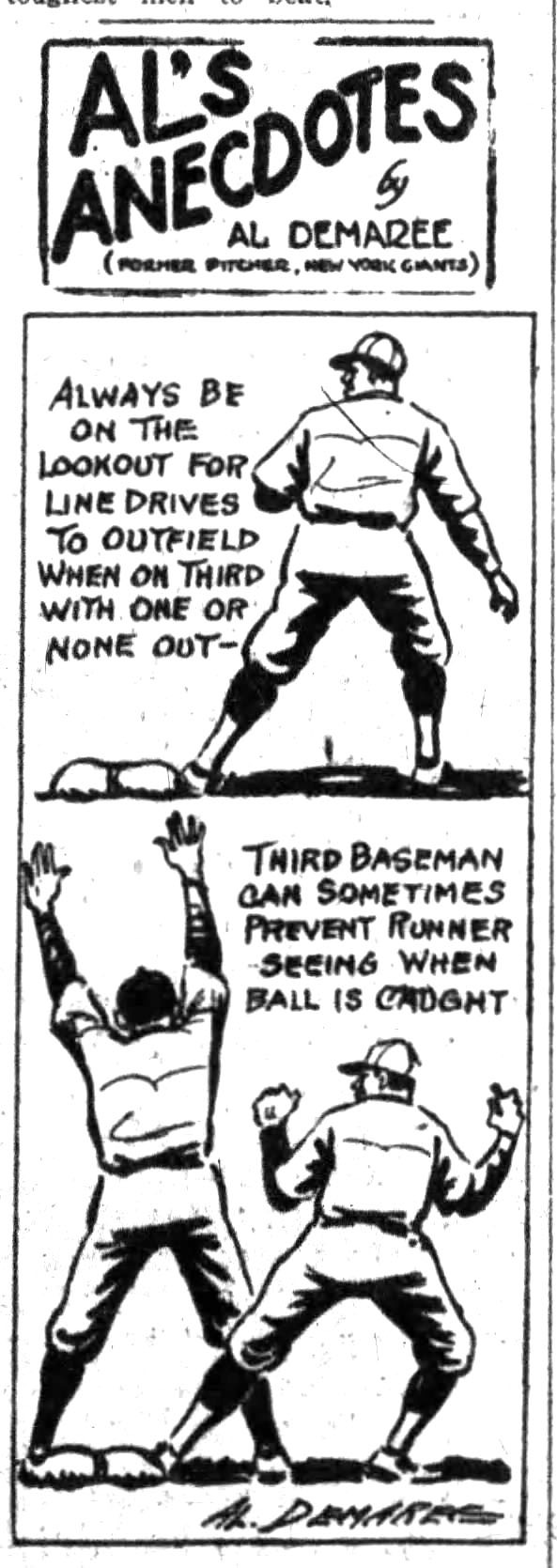
Cartoon topping an "Al's Anecdotes" installment from August 1930.

Even during his MLB career, Demaree was known for his cartooning. In the 1913 off-season, he did a vaudeville performance in which he cartooned and discussed his sports career. In 1924, he walked away from a signed deal to pitch for a Pacific Coast League to instead accept a job as a syndicated sports cartoonist. His work as a sports cartoonist and columnist, sometimes run under the title"Al's Anecdotes", ran for over a decade.
