= Breezer Bikes =

American company

- Industry: Bicycling
- Founder: Joe Breeze

Breezer Bikes is an American bicycle brand known for pioneering the first modern mountain bike. Founded in 1977 by Joe Breeze, Breezer played a crucial role in the development of off-road cycling and continues to manufacture a variety of bicycles, including mountain, road, and commuter bikes.

Breezer Bikes was sold to Advanced Sports International in 2008.

== History ==
Joe Breeze, a frame builder and cycling enthusiast from Marin County, California, is credited with building some of the first purpose-built mountain bikes. Before this, early mountain bikers modified old cruiser bicycles to handle rugged terrain. In 1977, Breeze designed and built the Breezer Series 1, the first modern mountain bike with a custom-built lightweight chromoly steel frame designed specifically for off-road riding.

Throughout the 1980s, Breezer Bikes helped shape the growing mountain biking scene. The brand was instrumental in advancing mountain bike geometry, frame materials, and component design. As mountain biking became more mainstream, the company expanded its offerings to include road, hybrid, and commuter bicycles.
