= Al Huenke =

American baseball player (1891–1974)

- Pitcher
- Born: June 26, 1891; New Bremen, Ohio
- Died: September 20, 1974 (aged 83); St. Marys, Ohio
- Batted: Right Threw: Right

MLB debut
- October 6, 1914, for the New York Giants

Last MLB appearance
- October 6, 1914, for the New York Giants

MLB statistics
- Games played: 1
- Innings pitched: 2
- Earned run average: 4.50
- Stats at Baseball Reference

Teams
- New York Giants (1914)

Albert Alfred Huenke (June 26, 1891 – September 20, 1974) was a pitcher in Major League Baseball who appeared in one game for the 1914 New York Giants.
