= Albert Eisentraut =

Albert Eisentraut of Oakland, California (United States), is an artist whose medium is bicycle frames. He has been building handmade bikes since 1959. Additionally, he has trained many better known custom builders through his classes he gave 1973–1992. His students include Bruce Gordon, Joe Breeze, Skip Hujsak, Mark Nobilette, Bill Stevenson and Bill Holland.
