= Judged trail ride =

A Judged trail ride is a type of trail riding popular in the western United States where horses and riders are asked to travel a natural trail for a set distance (usually 10 to 15 miles) with occasional stops for the horse and rider team to negotiate an obstacle, usually with varying options for difficulty, with higher scores given for completing the more difficult version of each obstacle.

Unlike endurance riding or Competitive trail riding, the ride is not timed. Only obstacle scores are utilized. Rides are informal and rules vary widely by region and individual ride.
