= Harry Smith (1910s catcher) =

American baseball player (1890–1922)

- Catcher
- Born: May 15, 1890; Baltimore, Maryland, U.S.
- Died: April 1, 1922 (aged 31); Charlotte, North Carolina, U.S.
- Batted: Right Threw: Right

MLB debut
- September 21, 1914, for the New York Giants

Last MLB appearance
- June 23, 1918, for the Cincinnati Reds

MLB statistics
- Batting average: .182
- Home runs: 1
- Runs batted in: 14
- Stats at Baseball Reference

Teams
- New York Giants (1914–15); Brooklyn Tip-Tops (1915); Cincinnati Reds (1917–18)

James Harry Smith (May 15, 1890 – April 1, 1922) was an American baseball player who played 75 games of Major League Baseball between 1914 and 1918, mostly as a catcher. In all he had 148 at bats, his 27 hits produced one homer and 14 RBI for an average of .182, not sufficient to prolong his career in the big leagues. He started with the New York Giants, moving to the Brooklyn Tip-Tops for 1915, but he returned mid-way through the season. He was absent from the big leagues for 1916, starting 1917 with Cincinnati Reds, but after a couple of seasons as a peripheral figure with an average below .200, he disappeared from the big leagues for good.
