= Velorama =

Bicycle museum in the Netherlands

Coordinates: 51°50′56″N 5°52′11″E

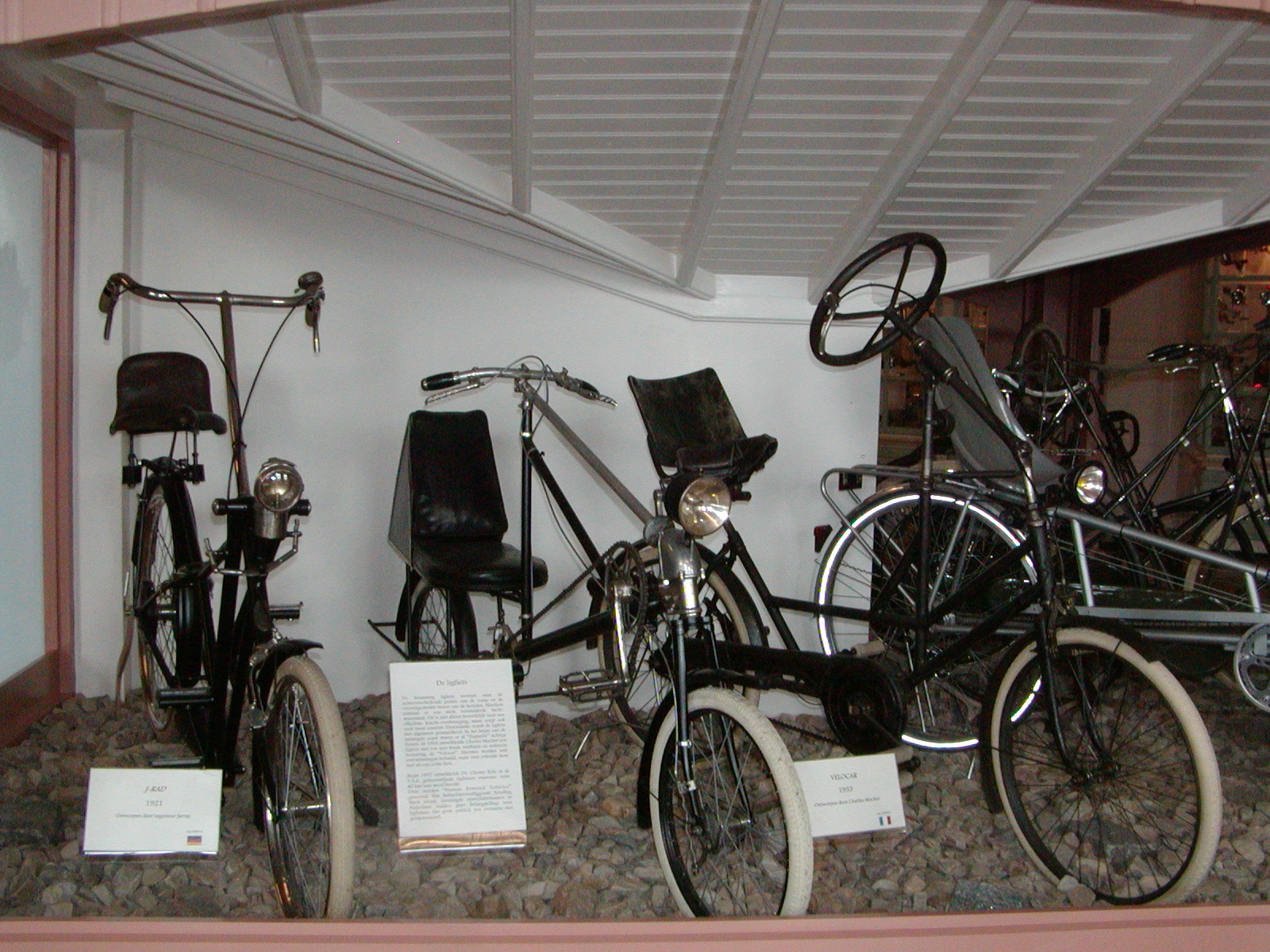
Recumbent bicycles from the 1920s in the Velorama

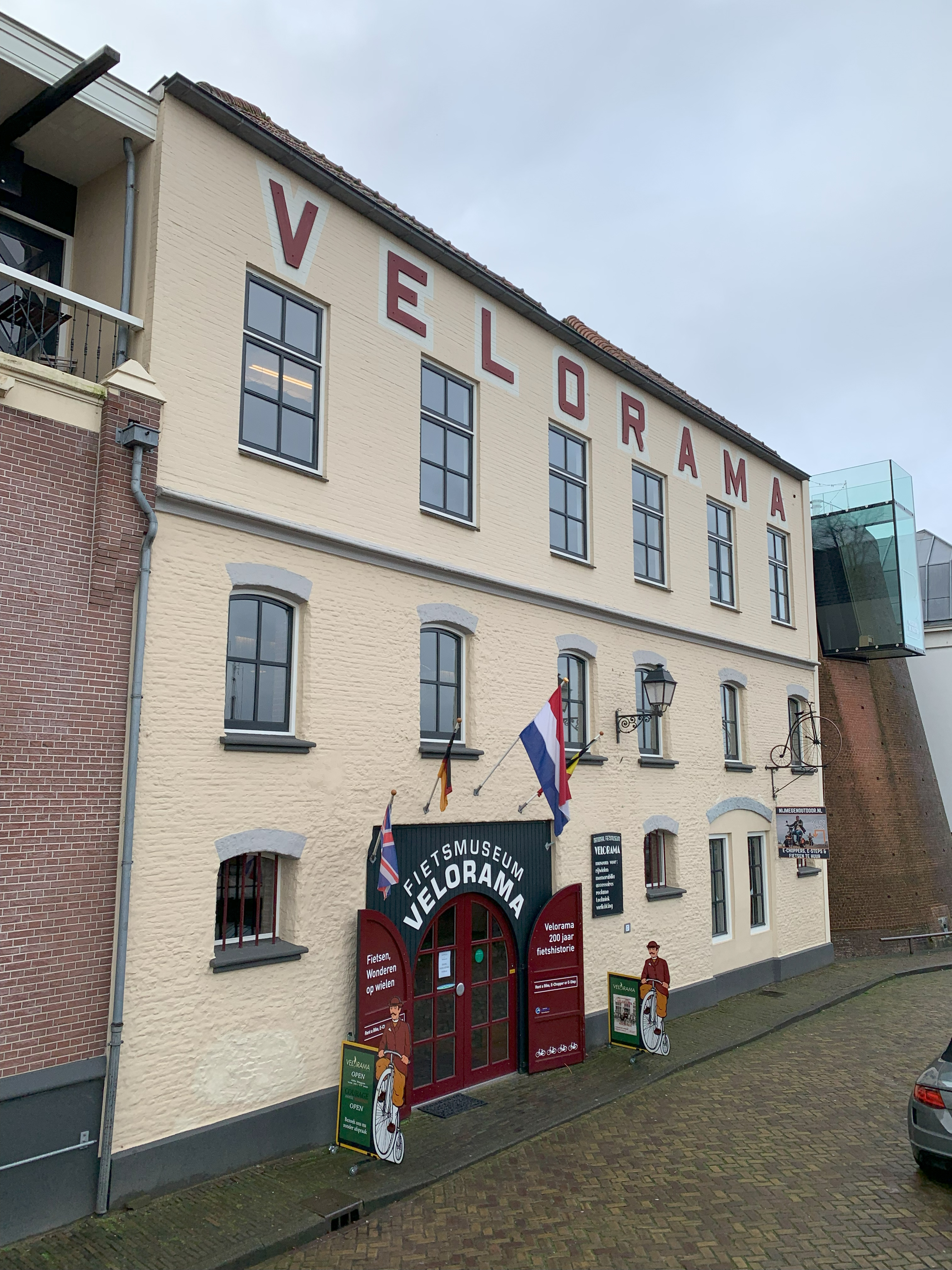
National bicycle museum Velorama in Nijmegen.

The Velorama (Dutch: Nationaal Fietsmuseum Velorama) is the only bicycle museum in the Netherlands. It is located along the Waal River in the city of Nijmegen.

The museum was founded in 1981 from the private collection of G.F. Moed. It exhibits more than 250 bicycles manufactured from the 19th century up to the present day, focusing on older models. The Velorama owns a large collection of bicycle literature and also preserves the historical archive of the Dutch bicycle manufacturer Gazelle.

Despite the prominence of bicycles in Dutch traffic policies and everyday transportation, The Velorama receives no government funding, which is unusual for museums in the Netherlands.

== See also ==
- List of bicycle and human powered vehicle museums
