= William Silvers =

American painter and illustrator

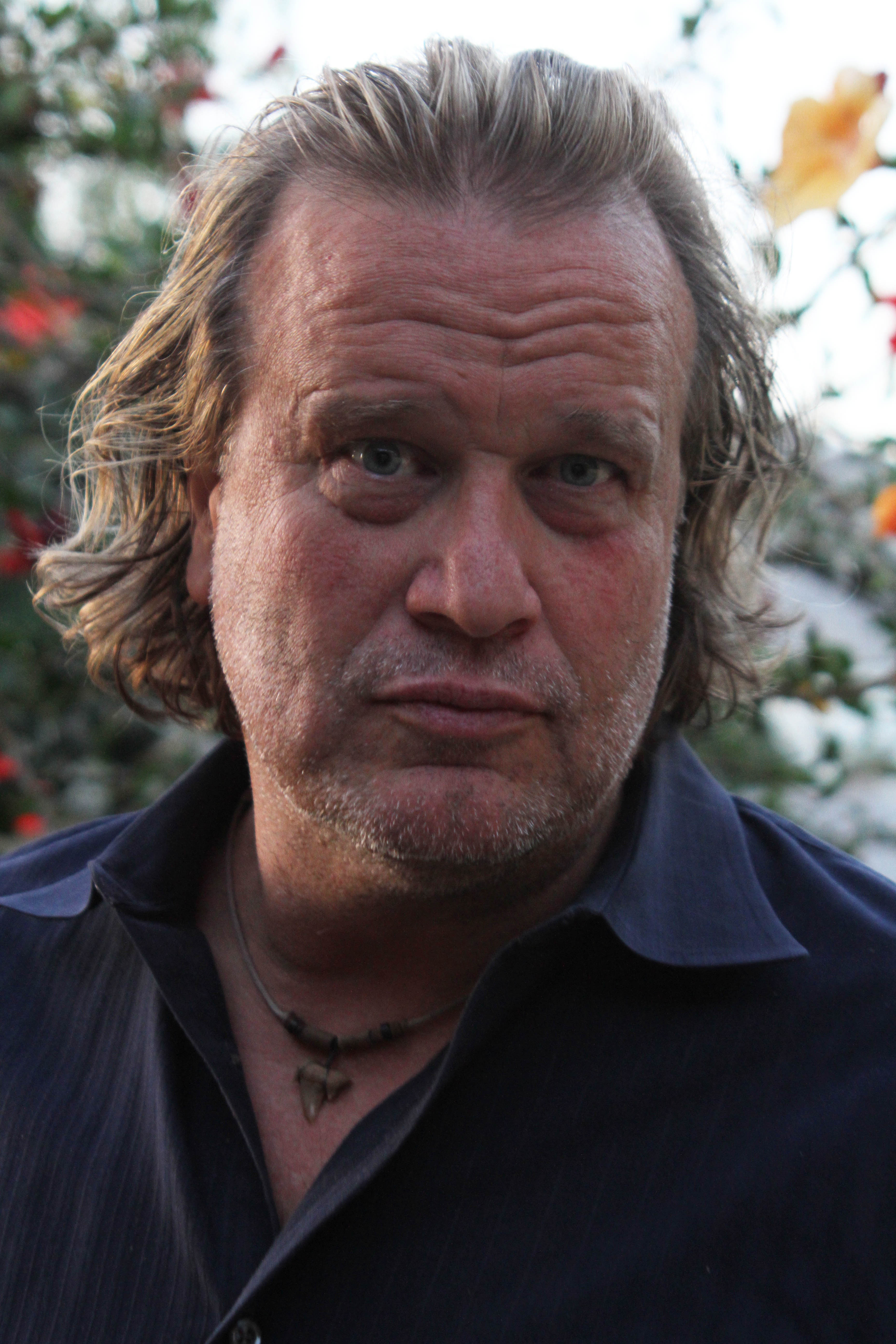
- Born: New Bremen, Ohio
- Known for: Painting
- Notable work: King of the Swamp; Going Fishing
- Movement: Wildlife art
- Awards: Arts for the Parks Founder's Favorite 2001; Arts for the Parks Region I Winner 2005

William Silvers (born in New Bremen, Ohio) is an American painter and illustrator, best known for his work in the field of wildlife art.

== Biography ==
Inspired by his father, who was also an artist, Silvers studied arts at the Bowling Green State University and earned a Bachelor of Fine Arts at the age of 21. After working for advertising agencies in New York City and an illustration studio for several years, he co-founded the art studio Live Wire Studios, located in Cleveland, Ohio, as vice president and Creative Director in 1990. Six years later Silvers started to work for the Walt Disney Feature Animation Studios in Orlando, Florida and painted backgrounds for animated feature films such as Mulan, Tarzan, Lilo & Stitch and Brother Bear. In 2004 he worked for Industrial Light and Magic on Star Wars: Episode III – Revenge of the Sith and Day After Tomorrow as a matte painter. He moved back to Florida and worked as Associate Art Director on the sports game NCAA Football of EA Tiburon. In 2008 he authored the book Painting Realistic Wildlife in Acrylic. From 2009 to 2014 he created matte paintings at DreamWorks Animation SKG on the films Shrek, Kung Fu Panda, Puss in Boots, How to Train Your Dragon, Mr. Peabody & Sherman, The Croods and Rise of the Guardians. In 2016 he worked as a matte painter in Vancouver BC on Storks for Sony Pictures Imageworks and Warner Brothers Pictures. Silvers is continuing his strong two-decade long relationship with Disney creating Licensed Disney Gallery Art to this day.

== Awards ==
In the 2001 Arts for the Parks competition of the National Park Academy of the Arts, Silvers won the Founder's Favorite award, which was endowed with a prize money of $1,500, for his painting King of the Swamp showing the head of a swimming crocodile. Four years later, in 2005, his painting Going Fishing was awarded with the Region I award (all entries east of the Mississippi River), which came with a prize money of $3,000.
