= Crown Equipment Corporation =

American manufacturer of industrial forklift trucks

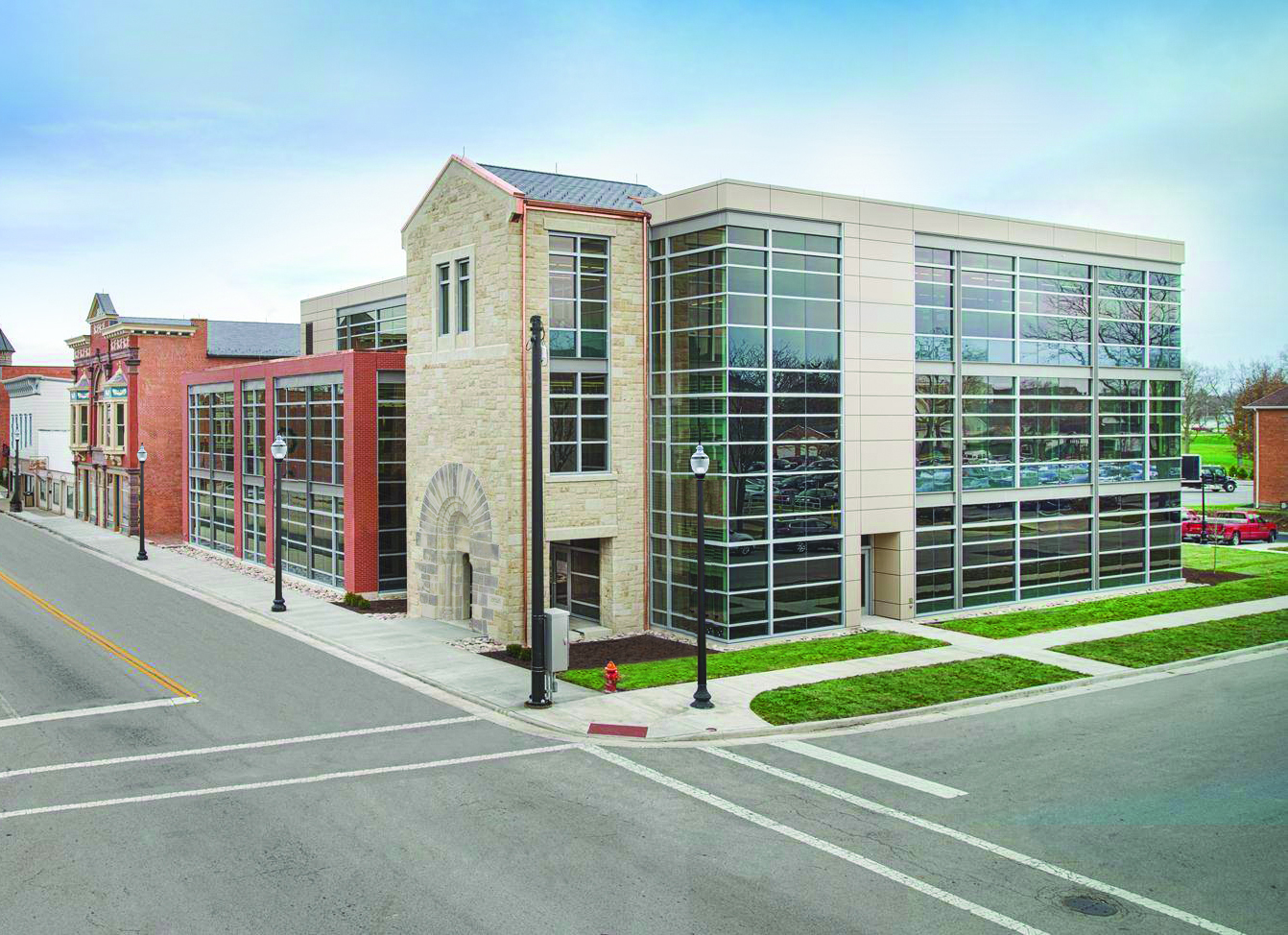
- The headquarters are in New Bremen, Ohio
- Type: Private
- Founded: 1945
- Headquarters: New Bremen, Ohio, USA
- Products: Lift Trucks
- Revenue: $5.26 billion (2025)
- Number of employees: 20,900 worldwide
- Website: www.crown.com

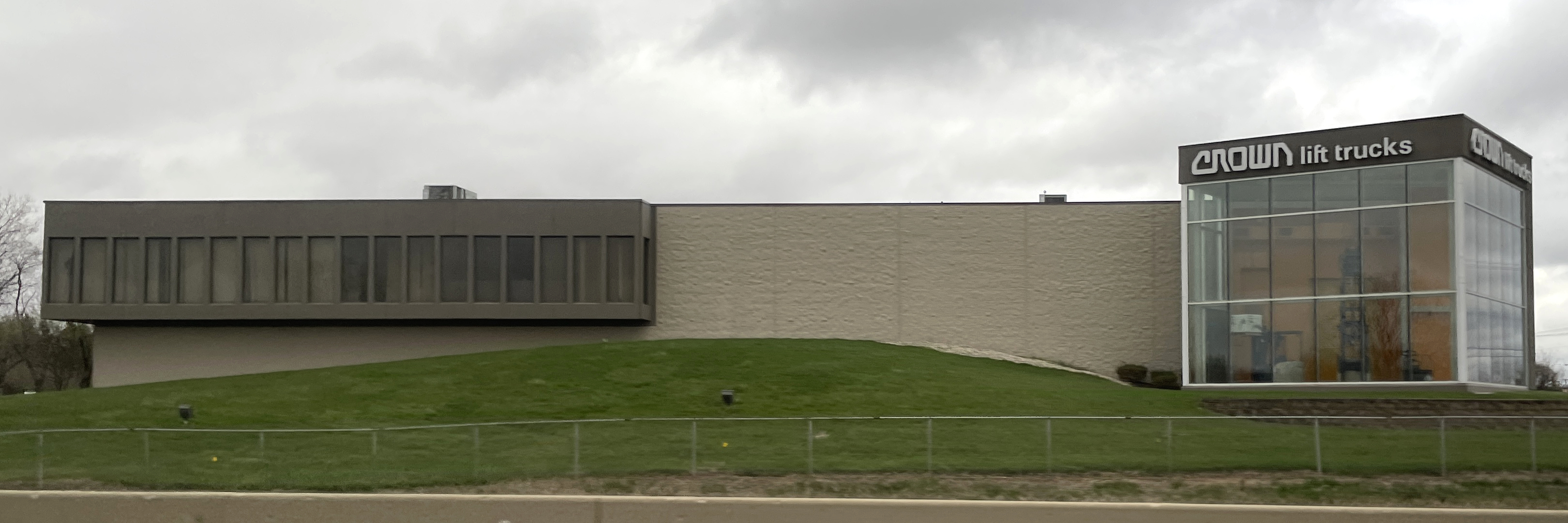
A Crown Equipment dealership in Vandalia, Ohio

Crown Equipment Corporation is a privately held American manufacturer of powered industrial forklift trucks based in Ohio. The fifth-largest such manufacturer, Crown had $5.26 billion in worldwide sales revenue for fiscal year 2025. The company was founded in 1945.

Based in the small community of New Bremen, Ohio, Crown got its start by first manufacturing temperature controls for coal-burning furnaces and then television antenna rotators. It diversified in several directions before finding its niche in the material handling industry. Its lift trucks are used worldwide in a variety of applications, such as transporting goods through the narrow aisles of warehouses, distribution centers and manufacturing facilities.

== Leadership ==
Carl and Allen Dicke and Carl’s son Jim Dicke founded Crown Controls in 1945. In 1952, when Carl died, 31-year-old Jim Dicke became president. Jim Dicke II was president from 1980 to 2002 and is the current CEO. Jim Dicke III is Crown’s current president.

== Manufacturing facilities ==
Crown manufactures up to 85 percent of the parts used in its lift trucks, producing components ranging from wire harnesses to electric motors. Crown's lift truck manufacturing facilities include over 1,500,000 square feet (140,000 m^{2}) in west central Ohio. Crown also has manufacturing facilities in North Carolina, Indiana and Illinois. It has manufacturing, distribution and sales operations in Germany and Mexico. Since April 2006, Crown has been manufacturing hand pallet trucks in a 150,000-square-foot (14,000 m^{2}) facility in Suzhou, China.

All Crown manufacturing facilities – including the small components, motor, mast and final assembly plants, as well as engineering, purchasing, design, distribution center and tool rooms have obtained ISO 9001:2000 certification.

Crown received the State of Ohio Governor's Award for Outstanding Achievements in Pollution Prevention in 1992. In 2004, the United States Environmental Protection Agency (EPA) designated Crown a Waste Minimization Partner, publicly recognizing the firm for its voluntary efforts. As part of EPA’s National Partnership for Environmental Priorities (NPEP) program, Crown set a partnership goal of eliminating chromium from its paints. Crown reduced its hazardous waste emissions by more than 300,000 pounds by removing chromium (in the form of ammonium dichromate as a flash rust inhibitor) from water-based paint formulations. By installing a new powder coat paint line, Crown eliminated more than 65 percent of wastewater from its water curtain paint booths, cutting more than 200,000 pounds of wastewater and sludge. The results included reduced air emissions, a better work environment and savings of $65,000 annually.

== Crown products and services ==
Crown manufactures narrow-aisle and very narrow-aisle stacking equipment, narrow-aisle reach trucks, counterbalanced trucks, high-level stockpickers, turret trucks, walkie stackers, work assist vehicles®, hand pallet trucks, powered pallet trucks, rider pallet trucks, and LP gas trucks.

In 1972, Crown introduced its first rider stand-up counterbalanced (RC) truck which featured a side stance position that allowed the driver, standing sideways, to see both forward and backward by turning his head. Prior to the Crown RC Series, operators who wished to travel in reverse had to operate the controls from behind their backs.

In 1980, Crown introduced its RR Series rider reach trucks, designed for the narrow aisles of warehouses and distribution centers. The RR truck won the “Design of the Decade” award from the Industrial Designers Society of America in 1990. Crown’s TSP 6000 Series (Turret Stockpicker), which enables warehouse storage on shelves dozens of feet above the floor, won 2007 international “Best of the Best” Red dot design award. The TSP 6000 also received a Silver IDEA Award from the Industrial Designers Society of America, the GOOD DESIGN Award from the Chicago and Athenaeum: Museum of Architecture and Design and the iF product design award from the International Forum Design in Hanover, Germany (photo by Thomas.net industrial newsroom).

Crown’s ST/SX 3000 Stacker Series received a Gold IDEA Award in 2007, presented by the Industrial Designers Society of America (IDSA). The X10 handle, which is also used on other Crown products, won a GOOD DESIGN award from the Chicago Athenaeum: Museum of Architecture and Design in 2004.

Crown's Wave Work Assist Vehicle®, brought to market in the late 1990s, is designed to transport, put away or retrieve loads, replacing handcarts, rolling ladders and warehouse ladders in both warehouses and manufacturing, maintenance and retail facilities. The Crown Wave won a Red Dot Design award for High Quality Design in 2000 and received a Gold IDEA Award from the Industrial Designers Society of America ( or http://www.docstoc.com/docs/39995846/Gold-Industrial-Design-Excellence-Award-(IDEA)-Winners-1995-1999) and the GOOD DESIGN Award from the Chicago and Athenaeum: Museum of Architecture and Design in 1999 (http://www.crown.com/usa/about/awards_1990.html).

== Fuel cell development ==
In March 2008, the state of Ohio awarded Crown nearly $1 million in grant funding to conduct fuel cell research. Crown’s research will address the technical and commercial barriers to using available battery replacement fuel cell power packs in industrial lift trucks. The study will facilitate the creation and growth of fuel cell-powered material handling equipment for use in warehouses and distribution centers. Crown will review the performance of each combination of its lift trucks with fuel cell power to identify modifications needed to allow the lift truck to perform as intended while complying with industry standards. The Ohio Department of Development and Ohio’s Third Frontier Commission are providing the grant.

== Hamech ==
In January 2008, Crown entered into a branding agreement with Komatsu lift trucks to distribute internal combustion lift trucks in the United States and Canada. In 2011, CLARK Material Handling Company and Crown Equipment Corporation entered into an agreement whereby CLARK supplied Crown with certain privately branded internal combustion trucks for distribution by Crown to factory stores and a limited number of independent Crown dealers in the United States and Canada. This brand of internal combustion lift trucks was marketed under the name Hamech (pronounced Hay-meck).

== C-5 Series ==
In December 2009, Crown marked the availability of its first company-manufactured internal combustion (IC) forklift with the release of the Crown C-5 Series.

The Crown C-5 Series features an industrial spark-ignited engine that was jointly developed with John Deere Power Systems (John Deere) based on one of their diesel engines, a proactive approach to engine cooling and radiator clearing via an on-demand cooling system, and design innovations that improves operator visibility, comfort and productivity.

== Training ==
In 2006, Crown’s training approach, called DP QuickStart®, earned an Award of Excellence for Outstanding Instructional Product from the International Society for Performance Improvement (ISPI). Under the Demonstrated Performance® (DP) instructional method, lift truck service technicians must show they have mastered one core skill needed to service an industrial lift truck before moving on to learn the next one. With DP QuickStart, which replaced lecture-based training sessions, technicians study and practice at their own pace while completing training modules.

== Early history ==
The company traces its evolution to the 1920s, when it manufactured and sold temperature controls for coal-burning furnaces as the Pioneer Heat Regulator Company. That market disappeared as the nation turned to gas heat. In 1945, the company was changing focus and became Crown Controls Corp. In 1949, as a market for television emerged, Crown began producing television antenna rotators. For two decades, starting in the late 1950s, Crown’s survival and growth were supported by subcontract work, manufacturing mechanical and electrical components for private industry (e.g., Baldwin Pianos and IBM) and the U.S. government, especially the military.

Crown entered the material handling industry with niche products in which the major players had no interest. After shipping its first model in 1956, Crown developed several specialty lift trucks, including stockpickers and order pickers for the U.S. government, a hamper-dumper truck for the U.S. Postal Service, and trucks for carrying caskets for funeral parlors. Crown later decided to stop making so many one-of-a-kind trucks and developed two lines of E-Z Lift Trucks: an H series (hand-operated) and a B series (battery-operated). In 1959, when its lift trucks had annual sales of about $50,000, antenna rotators had annual sales of $700,000, but the transition to the lift truck business was under way. Crown stopped manufacturing the rotators in late 2000.

Crown hired Deane Richardson and David B. Smith, of RichardsonSmith, to design a medium-duty hand-controlled pallet truck, which went on the market in 1962. That pallet truck won a design excellence award from the American Iron and Steel Institute in 1965. Good design became part of Crown’s corporate strategy. Crown focused on niche markets, which didn’t affect competitors whose bread and butter were gas trucks and electric rider trucks. In 1970, Levitz, the furniture discounter, placed an order for 67 Crown stockpickers, which got momentum for sales going. That year, Crown joined the Industrial Truck Association and opened a plant in Australia.
