= Joe Breeze =

American bicycle framebuilder and designer

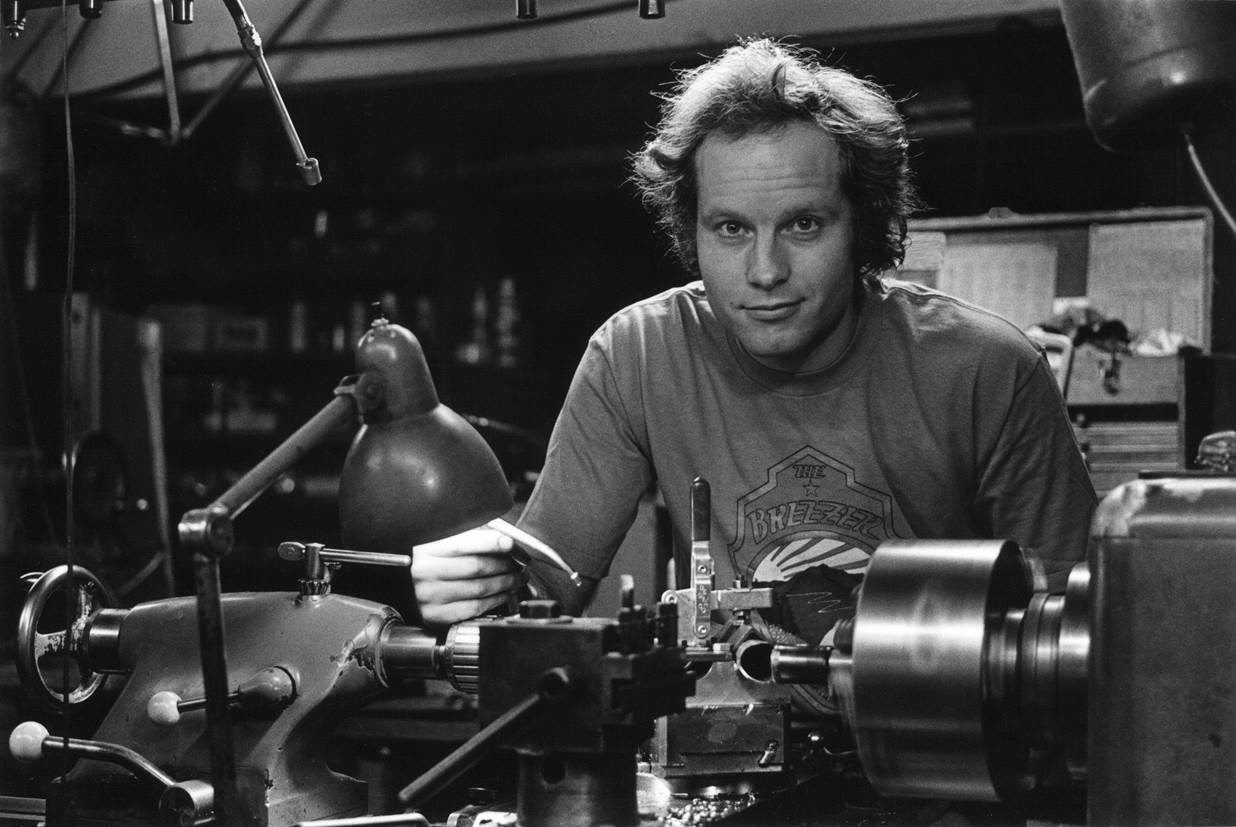
- Breeze in 1984
- Born: 1953 (age 72–73)
- Education: College of Marin
- Known for: Role in creating the mountain bike
- Cycling career
- Sport: Cycling
- Disciplines: Road racing, cyclocross
- Role: Rider

Professional team
- 1970s: Velo Club Tamalpais

Joe Breeze (born 1953) is an American bicycle framebuilder, designer and advocate from Marin County, California. An early participant in the sport of mountain biking, Breeze, along with other pioneers including Gary Fisher, Charlie Kelly, and Tom Ritchey, is known for his central role in developing the mountain bike. Breeze is credited with designing and building the first all-new mountain bikes, which riders colloquially called Breezers. He built the prototype, known as Breezer #1, in 1977 and completed nine more Series I Breezers by early 1978. Breezer #1 is now in the collection of the Smithsonian Institution’s National Museum of American History.

Breeze, a road bike racer through the 1970s, was among the fastest downhill racers at Repack, mountain biking's seminal race held west of Fairfax, California. He won 10 of the 24 Repack races, which took place between 1976 and 1984. Breeze is a charter member of the Mountain Bike Hall of Fame; he was inducted in 1988.

Breeze developed mountain bike and road-racing bike designs through the 1980s and most of the 1990s, then focused his efforts on advocacy for bicycle transportation. In the early 2000s he devoted his Breezer brand entirely to transportation, introducing in 2002 a line of bikes for everyday use, equipping them for local trips, errands in town and commuting.

In 2008, Breeze sold the Breezer brand to Advanced Sports International and since then has worked for the company as Breezer frame designer, designing transportation bikes, road bikes and mountain bikes under the Breezer name.

Since 2015, Breeze has served on the board and as Head Curator at the Marin Museum of Bicycling.

== Background ==
Breeze grew up in Mill Valley, California, at the foot of Mount Tamalpais, just north of San Francisco. He graduated from Tamalpais High School, which at the time had extensive technical training facilities. He studied architectural and engineering drafting there for four years. His father, Bill Breeze, was a machinist and owner of the Sports Car Center in Sausalito, California. An avid cyclist at a time when cycling was not a common activity for adults in the US, Bill Breeze sometimes commuted to work by bicycle, and he shared with his son an appreciation for efficient, lightweight vehicles and for the bicycle as king of such vehicles. The two often discussed the properties of metals and technical aspects of bicycle design. In 1974 Joe Breeze took a course in the art of bicycle framebuilding from Albert Eisentraut in Oakland, California, and began to build his own custom-tailored road racing frames, using his father's machine shop at their home in Mill Valley. He also studied Machine and Metals Technology at College of Marin from 1974 to 1976.

Breeze had taken up cycling seriously as a teenager in the late 1960s, sometimes going on rides of a few hundred miles. He also enjoyed cycling and saw such value in the bicycle as a vehicle, he wanted to spread the word. In 1970 he took up road-bike racing, figuring that publicity about races could show people how fast and far a bicycle could go. Breeze also studied bicycle history and while traveling for races he searched for early bicycles. He hoped to promote cycling by restoring and displaying examples from the 1890s, the high point of bicycle technology.

== Development of the mountain bike ==
Joe Breeze raced road bikes throughout the 1970s, eventually racing in the top category. By 1972 Breeze was also competing in cyclocross races and often rode on the trails of Mount Tamalpais. In 1973, he and Velo Club Tamalpais teammate Marc Vendetti were looking for fine early bikes and found a less elegant relic: a 1941 Schwinn-built balloon-tire bike. Vendetti had a few years earlier ridden similar 1930s-40s “paper boy” bikes on Tamalpais at the periphery of the mountain's seminal group of off-road riders, the Larkspur Canyon Gang. Encouraged by Vendetti, Breeze bought the old fat-tire bike for $5, stripped off its extraneous parts and rode it down Mount Tamalpais. He loved it.

Breeze, Vendetti and Velo Club Tamalpais teammate Otis Guy were soon riding Mount Tamalpais trails together regularly. They and other teammates including Gary Fisher, and other enthusiasts from Marin located old fat-tire “ballooner” bikes of many makes, used them off-road and settled on Schwinns built between 1937 and 1944 as the best. They would remove extraneous parts from the bikes, strip them down to their original paint and ride them on Marin's rugged fire roads and trails. Some, including Gary Fisher, added parts such as gears and derailleurs to their ballooners.

In 1976 Breeze began to compete in Repack races. A downhill time trial on fire roads in the hills west of Fairfax, California, Repack brought together riders from around Mount Tamalpais who stripped down older bikes for off-road use and fitted rugged parts to them. Repack served as a testing ground for off-road bikes.

The heavy old fat-tire bike frames, made of mild steel, were not standing up to the rigors of mountain biking. Breeze was asked by Charlie Kelly to build a mountain bike frame and in early 1977 Breeze agreed to do so. While working on the design for the mountain bike, Breeze took orders to make mountain bikes for several other Marin County off-road cycling enthusiasts. He completed the prototype (Breezer #1) in Fall 1977 and rode it to victory at Repack. Breeze finished nine more Breezer mountain bikes by June 1978. He built up the bikes with all-new parts, which he sourced from around the world. Those ten Breezer Series 1 bikes, made of chrome-moly alloy steel, are widely considered the first modern mountain bikes.

The first ten Breezer mountain bikes can be recognized by their twin lateral tubes, which Breeze included to stiffen the long frames for high-speed tracking. Breeze revised his designs shortly after, and shared his ideas for the next generation of mountain bikes with other framebuilders, including Tom Ritchey (of Palo Alto, 50 miles south of Marin) who built his first mountain bike frames in 1979. Ritchey became the frame supplier to the Marin County company MountainBikes, founded in 1979 by Gary Fisher and Charlie Kelly. The mountain bike's progression from local San Francisco Bay Area builders to the larger industry was complete in Fall 1981, when Specialized Bicycle Components introduced a lower-priced production mountain bike, the Specialized Stumpjumper, built in Japan and based on the Ritchey-built bikes sold by Fisher and Kelly.

== Early mountain bike racing, events ==
Joe Breeze raced in 19 of the 24 Repack races, winning 10 times. Twenty-two of the Repack races, downhill time trials organized and promoted by Charlie Kelly, were held from 1976 to 1979. Repack is known as mountain biking's first recorded competition. The last Repack race in 1979 was filmed by a TV crew for a San Francisco Bay Area news program, KPIX Evening Magazine. That filmed account aired nationally, spreading the word about mountain biking to a larger audience. The Repack race was revived for two more runs, in 1983 and 1984, becoming the first officially sanctioned downhill mountain bike race. A mosaic tribute to Repack was installed in downtown Fairfax in 2013.

In 1978, Joe Breeze was one of five riders from Marin County to travel to Crested Butte, Colorado, to participate in the Pearl Pass Tour, a two-day, off-road ride from Crested Butte to Aspen, over 12,700 foot Pearl Pass. Joe Breeze, Charlie Kelly, and Wende Cragg rode their 1977 and 1978 Breezers, while the other participants, including Gary Fisher and Michael Castelli of Marin County and several Crested Butte residents, rode modified Schwinns from the 1930s to 1950s. Crested Butte became an important destination for mountain biking; the Pearl Pass Tour, founded in 1976, is the sport's longest running annual two-day event.

In 1983, Breeze and several others founded NORBA (National Off-Road Bicycle Association), the first sanctioning organization for off-road bicycle racing. Breeze designed the NORBA logo and championed the rule requiring that racers do their own repairs during races. He maintained that a self-sufficiency rule for racing would ensure that manufacturers would keep their focus on durable bikes for all riders. NORBA is now part of USA Cycling.

== Breezer mountain and road bikes in 1980s and 1990s ==
In 1980-81 Breeze built a second series of Breezer mountain bikes with oversize tubing in a diamond frame, and in 1982 to 1985 he built a third series. Breeze continued to develop and refine his mountain bike designs in the 1980s and 1990s. In 1986 he designed the American Breezer, an aluminum mountain bike built in St. Cloud, Minnesota. In the 1990s he designed a line of steel and aluminum Breezer bikes sold worldwide. Mountain bike models included the Breezer Lightning, Jet Stream, Thunder, Storm, Beamer, Twister, and Tornado. The 1993 Breezer Venturi, a road bike, featured compact geometry, which later became standard in the industry.

== Bicycle transportation ==
Breeze's long-term interest has been to see more people using bicycles in everyday life and not only for recreation. On a cycling trip in Europe in 1971 he saw excellent bicycle infrastructure in the Netherlands, and people of all ages using bikes for daily transportation; this suggested possibilities for the United States that continued to inspire him through the mountain bike boom of the 1980s and 1990s.

Breeze has said that the mountain bike, being easy to ride and thus appealing to non-cyclists, "got more Americans onto bikes than any other bike since the 1890s." He observed in the 1990s, however, that as high-end mountain bike design (including his own) was geared increasingly toward race bikes, lower-priced mountain bikes followed suit and thus the bikes became less accessible to the masses. "The mountain bike opened cycling up to a lot of people by being friendlier than road bikes," Breeze wrote in 1997. "Maybe it's time for another bike to do that again." His 1996 Breezer Ignaz X cruiser was the first bike he designed for town use. (The bike's name was a tribute to Ignaz Schwinn, the Schwinn Bicycle Company founder who popularized modern "balloon" tires in the 1930s, and also to the Schwinn Excelsior X bike that was the inspiration for much of Breeze's early off-road riding.)

In the late 1990s Breeze devoted himself full-time to advocating for bicycle transportation, working with government agencies to make streets more bicycle-friendly and with grass-roots organizations to promote the bicycle as a practical mode of transportation. Transportation cycling, he said, addresses many issues at once: obesity, oil dependence, traffic congestion, global warming, lack of time for exercise. He and other Marin County bicycle advocates visited Washington, DC to advocate for better cycling infrastructure and a national Safe Routes to School program. For the Marin County Bicycle Coalition, he created in 1998 and periodically revises a detailed map of Marin's current and potential bicycle routes.

Through the latter half of the 1990s, Breeze had been urging the U.S. bicycle industry to start producing bikes that non-athletes could use to get places in daily life. In 2001, still seeing a need in the United States for bikes fully equipped for errands and commutes, Breeze devoted his own Breezer brand to transportation. He introduced in 2002 a line of bikes designed for everyday, practical use that integrated fenders, racks, and generator lights. With model names like Uptown, Villager, Citizen, Liberty and Greenway, these Breezer bikes were similar to European utility bikes in being fully equipped, but Breeze designed them to be lighter and more ergonomically efficient. Since then the bicycle transportation sector, long a staple in other parts of the world, has become an important bicycle market in the United States.

In 2008, Breeze sold his Breezer brand to Advanced Sports International of Philadelphia, Pennsylvania, and since then has worked for the company as Breezer frame designer. The arrangement allowed him to concentrate on design and product development and create more bikes for a wide range of purposes. The company introduced Joe Breeze's new line of Breezer mountain bikes in 2010. Breeze's current designs include transportation bikes, road bikes and mountain bikes.

== Film; museum collections and exhibits ==
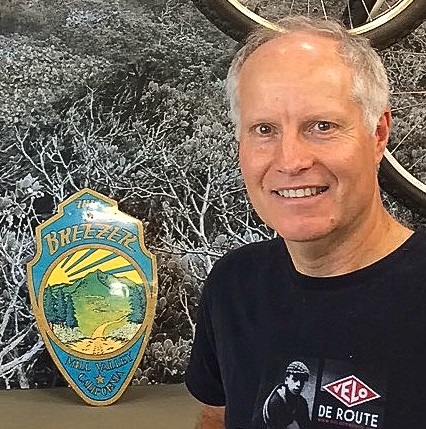
Breeze at Marin Museum of Bicycling (2015)

Joe Breeze, along with many others involved in the early history of mountain bikes, was featured in the 2007 documentary film Klunkerz: A Film About Mountain Bikes.

Breezer #1 (1977) was on display at the Oakland Museum, Cowell Hall of California History, from 1985 to 2011. In 2012 it became part of the collection of the Smithsonian National Museum of American History in Washington, DC. Breezer #2 (1978), which Joe Breeze built for MountainBikes co-founder Charlie Kelly, is on display at the Mountain Bike Hall of Fame, part of the Marin Museum of Bicycling in Fairfax, California.

Breezer #9 is on display at Shimano's Bicycle Museum Cycle Center in Sakai City, Japan. Several Breezer bikes from the 1980s and 1990s are in the collection of The Museum of Mountain Bike Art & Technology in Statesville, NC. Breeze's own 1982 (Series 3) Breezer mountain bike is on display at the US Bicycling Hall of Fame in Davis, California.

A major exhibition on the history of the mountain bike in Northern California, at San Francisco International Airport's SFO Museum (July 2012 to February 2013), displayed 27 bikes and many related artifacts. The show was called "From Repack to Rwanda: The Origins, Evolution, and Global Reach of the Mountain Bike." Included were Joe Breeze's 1941 Schwinn-built BF Goodrich modified by Breeze in 1973 for off-road riding, and Breezer #6, built by Joe Breeze in 1977-78 for rider-photographer Wende Cragg.

Joe Breeze, Otis Guy, Marc Vendetti and others are co-founders of the Marin Museum of Bicycling in Fairfax, California, which opened to the public in June 2015. Joe Breeze is Curator of the museum, which displays bicycles from the late 1860s to the present and functions as a cycling cultural center.
