= New Bremen, Ohio =

- Village
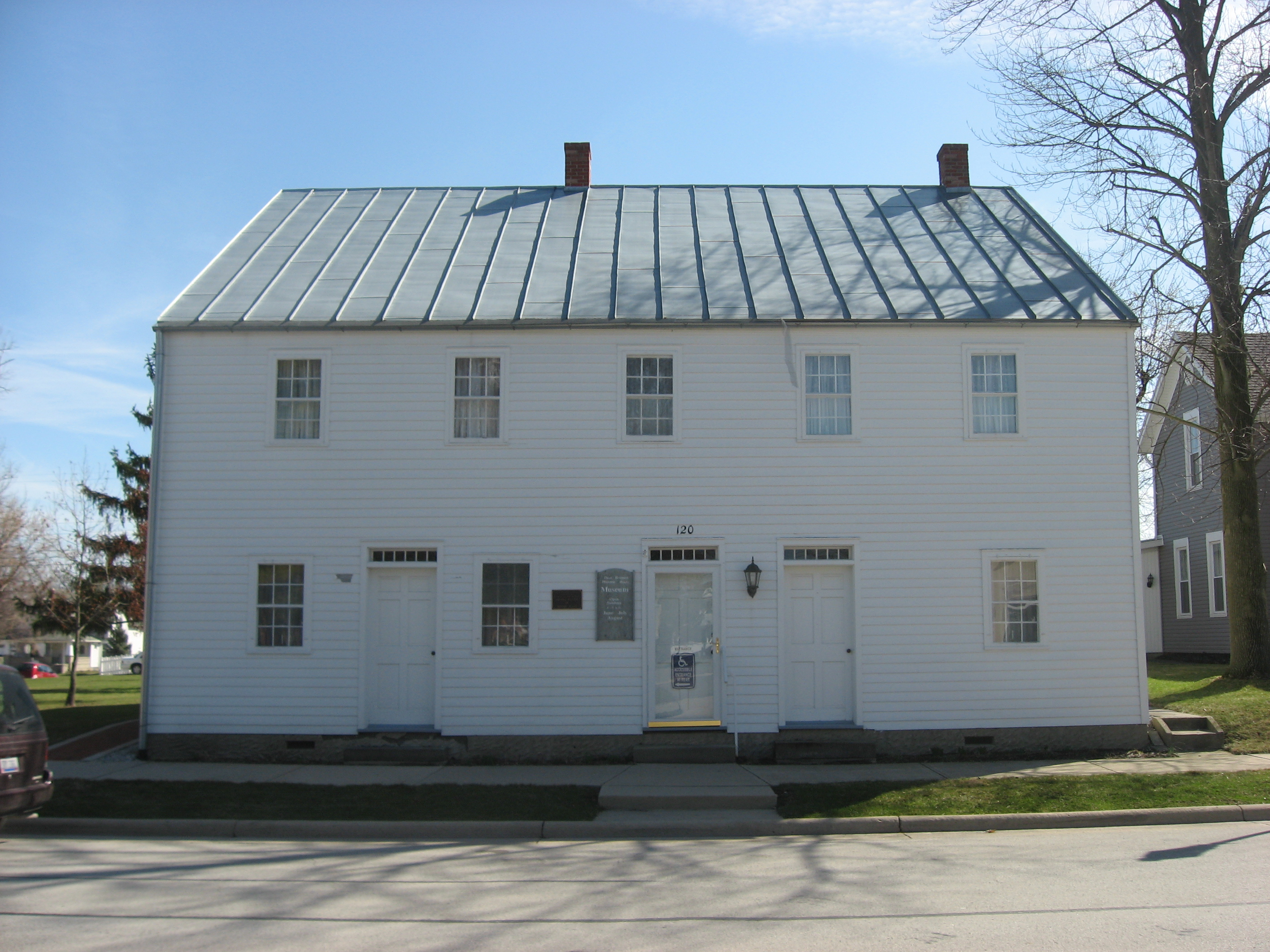
- The William Luelleman House, a historic house along the canal

- Flag Seal Logo
- Motto: Promise, Peace, Prosperity
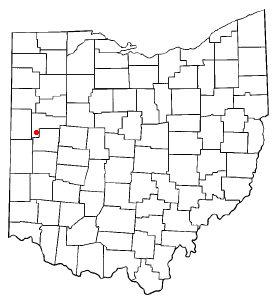
- Location of New Bremen, Ohio

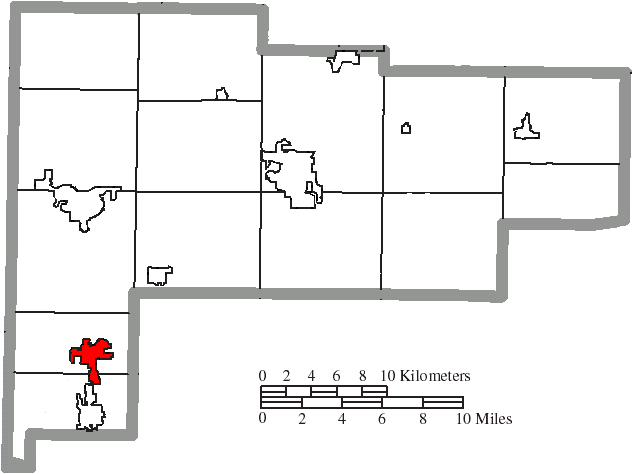
- Location of New Bremen in Auglaize County
- Coordinates: 40°26′11″N 84°22′46″W
- Country: United States
- State: Ohio
- County: Auglaize
- Townships: German, Jackson

Government
  - Mayor: Robert Parker

Area
  - Total: 2.34 sq mi (6.06 km^{2})
  - Land: 2.34 sq mi (6.06 km^{2})
  - Water: 0 sq mi (0.00 km^{2})
- Elevation: 948 ft (289 m)

Population (2020)
  - Total: 3,034
  - Density: 1,296.9/sq mi (500.73/km^{2})
- Time zone: UTC-5 (Eastern (EST))
  - Summer (DST): UTC-4 (EDT)
- ZIP code: 45869
- Area code: 419
- FIPS code: 39-54194
- GNIS feature ID: 2399458
- Website: newbremen.com

New Bremen (/ˈbriː.mən/ BREE-mən) is a village in Auglaize County, Ohio, United States. The population was 3,034 at the 2020 census. It is included in the Wapakoneta, Ohio Micropolitan Statistical Area. The village is adjacent to Minster to the south.

The village was founded by German immigrants in 1833 and is named after Bremen. It is home to the Bicycle Museum of America. New Bremen is also the world headquarters of Crown Equipment Corporation.

== History ==
The town was first a farming community started by Bavarians and Hanoverians, following a route from Bremen, Germany to America, through West Virginia and along the Ohio River to Cincinnati. Once Cincinnati was reached the founders formed a group called the City of Bremen Society, which drew up a charter among its 33 members. This charter authorized the purchase of 80 acres of Ohio land to build a town. Land within German Township was first established as a farming community in 1832, and by 1833 the plat of Bremen was recorded with 102 shares of land to be given away by lottery.

A village was established, but growth had been stunted by lack of accessible markets, and malaria. Transportation through swampy terrain was slow and expensive compared to other areas. This all would change with the completion of the Miami and Erie Canal. There were so few in the town that subcontractors had to rely on "jiggers" or 2oz bottles of whiskey to attract workers. The Canal was soon finished and opened. When opened, the Canal brought new markets to New Bremen, lowering transportation costs thus adding value to agricultural products that before the canal had little cash value. Increased potential profitability also lowered the risks of additional investments. The town became a busy place very quickly, with hundreds of freight boats moving frequently, along with dozens of passenger boats filled with people making the trip from Cincinnati. The locks from the Canal have been restored, along with the addition of a lock keeper's house and can be seen in New Bremen's downtown area.

== Geography ==
The southern edge of New Bremen is the most southern point of the St. Lawrence River Basin which covers an area of 519,000 sq. miles. This feat is achieved by being the headwaters of the St. Mary's River, which is a tributary of the Maumee River. The Maumee River and basin (8316 sq miles) is the largest and most southern tributary of Lake Erie and any of the Great Lakes.

According to the United States Census Bureau, the village has a total area of 2.15 square miles (5.57 km^{2}), all land.

== Demographics ==
Historical population
Census	Pop.	Note	%±
1850	344		—
1860	379		10.2%
1870	528		39.3%
1880	1,169		121.4%
1890	1,239		6.0%
1900	1,318		6.4%
1910	1,586		20.3%
1920	1,562		−1.5%
1930	1,485		−4.9%
1940	1,484		−0.1%
1950	1,548		4.3%
1960	1,972		27.4%
1970	2,185		10.8%
1980	2,393		9.5%
1990	2,558		6.9%
2000	2,909		13.7%
2010	2,978		2.4%
2020	3,034		1.9%
U.S. Decennial Census

=== 2020 census ===
As of the 2020 census, New Bremen had a population of 3,034. The median age was 39.5 years. 24.3% of residents were under the age of 18 and 17.4% of residents were 65 years of age or older. For every 100 females there were 99.2 males, and for every 100 females age 18 and over there were 98.4 males age 18 and over.

99.7% of residents lived in urban areas, while 0.3% lived in rural areas.

There were 1,218 households in New Bremen, of which 30.1% had children under the age of 18 living in them. Of all households, 61.8% were married-couple households, 15.6% were households with a male householder and no spouse or partner present, and 19.5% were households with a female householder and no spouse or partner present. About 26.3% of all households were made up of individuals and 10.2% had someone living alone who was 65 years of age or older.

There were 1,286 housing units, of which 5.3% were vacant. The homeowner vacancy rate was 0.7% and the rental vacancy rate was 2.5%.

Racial composition as of the 2020 census
Race	Number	Percent
White	2,839	93.6%
Black or African American	20	0.7%
American Indian and Alaska Native	1	0.0%
Asian	46	1.5%
Native Hawaiian and Other Pacific Islander	1	0.0%
Some other race	32	1.1%
Two or more races	95	3.1%
Hispanic or Latino (of any race)	67	2.2%

=== 2010 census ===
As of the census of 2010, there were 2,978 people, 1,145 households, and 841 families living in the village. The population density was 1,385.1 inhabitants per square mile (534.8/km^{2}). There were 1,266 housing units at an average density of 588.8 per square mile (227.3/km^{2}). The racial makeup of the village was 97.8% White, 0.1% African American, 0.1% Native American, 0.5% Asian, 0.4% from other races, and 1.0% from two or more races. Hispanic or Latino of any race were 1.2% of the population.

There were 1,145 households, of which 35.9% had children under the age of 18 living with them, 65.3% were married couples living together, 5.4% had a female householder with no husband present, 2.7% had a male householder with no wife present, and 26.6% were non-families. 24.5% of all households were made up of individuals, and 8.2% had someone living alone who was 65 years of age or older. The average household size was 2.60 and the average family size was 3.12.

The median age in the village was 38.2 years. 27.8% of residents were under the age of 18; 6.4% were between the ages of 18 and 24; 26.4% were from 25 to 44; 27.4% were from 45 to 64; and 12% were 65 years of age or older. The gender makeup of the village was 49.8% male and 50.2% female.

=== 2000 census ===
As of the census of 2000, there were 2,909 people, 1,073 households, and 792 families living in the village. The population density was 1,410.5 inhabitants per square mile (544.6/km^{2}). There were 1,131 housing units at an average density of 548.4 per square mile (211.7/km^{2}). The racial makeup of the village was 98.28% White, 0.03% African American, 0.38% Native American, 0.52% Asian, 0.14% from other races, and 0.65% from two or more races. Hispanic or Latino of any race were 0.31% of the population.

There were 1,073 households, out of which 40.4% had children under the age of 18 living with them, 64.6% were married couples living together, 6.6% had a female householder with no husband present, and 26.1% were non-families. 24.4% of all households were made up of individuals, and 11.1% had someone living alone who was 65 years of age or older. The average household size was 2.71 and the average family size was 3.26.

In the village, the population was spread out, with 31.6% under the age of 18, 6.5% from 18 to 24, 30.4% from 25 to 44, 19.7% from 45 to 64, and 11.8% who were 65 years of age or older. The median age was 34 years. For every 100 females there were 96.7 males. For every 100 females age 18 and over, there were 95.0 males.

The median income for a household in the village was $51,643, and the median income for a family was $61,011. Males had a median income of $37,324 versus $24,979 for females. The per capita income for the village was $20,401. About 0.8% of families and 1.4% of the population were below the poverty line, including none of those under age 18 and 3.1% of those age 65 or over.

== Education ==
The New Bremen Local Schools system consists of a high school (New Bremen High School), middle school, and elementary school. New Bremen has a public library, a branch of the Auglaize County Public Library.

== Notable people ==
- Edward Conradi, President Florida State College for Women (1909-1941; now Florida State University).
- Whitey Guese, baseball player.
- Al Huenke, baseball player.
- Jim Melchert, ceramicist, sculptor, director of the Visual Arts Program of the National Endowment for the Arts, director of the American Academy in Rome.
- William Silvers, painter and illustrator
