= Marin Museum of Bicycling =

Bicycle museum in Fairfax, California

Coordinates: 37.9879°N 122.5897°W

The Marin Museum of Bicycling and Mountain Bike Hall of Fame
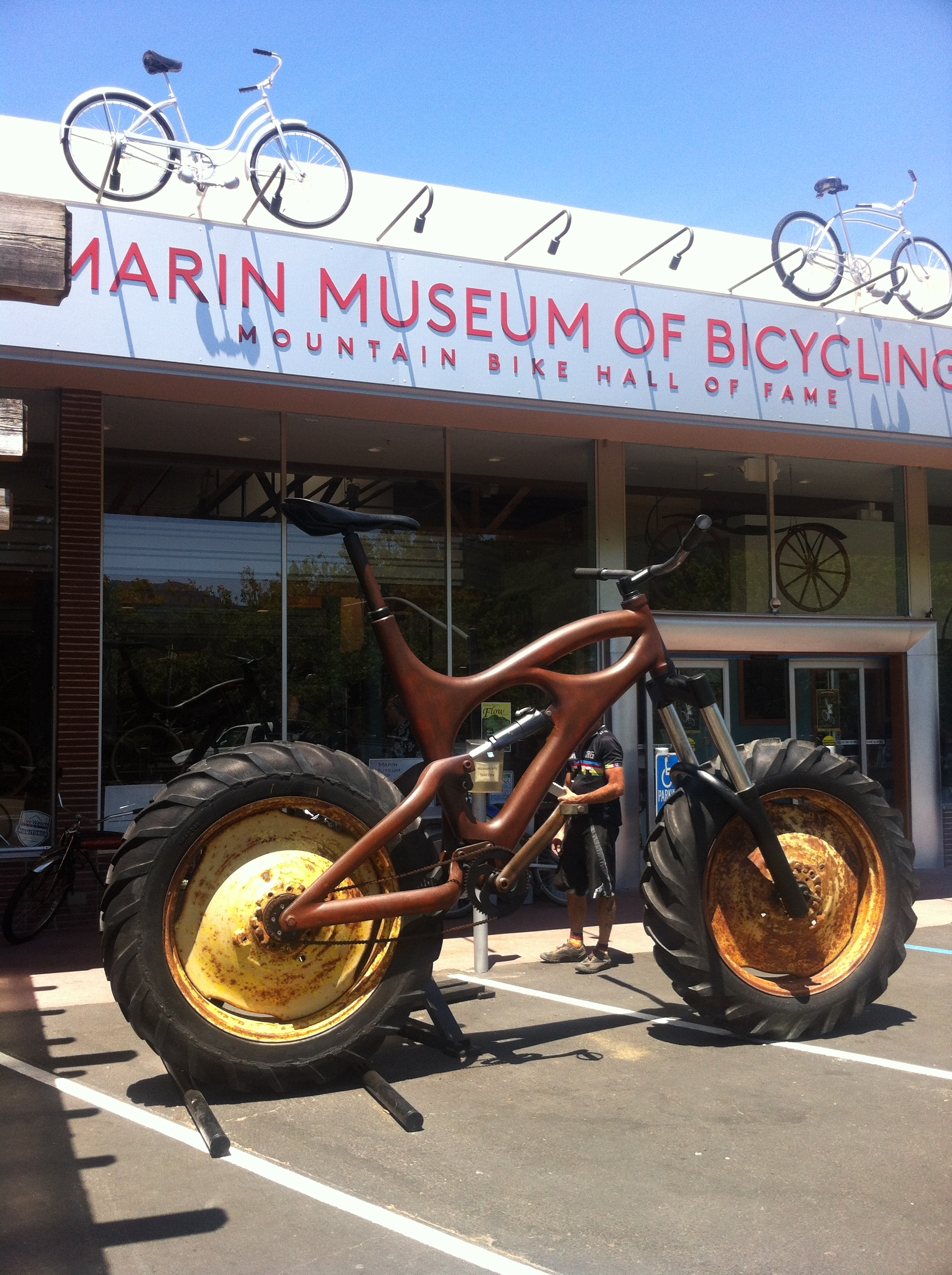
- Established: June 6, 2015
- Location: 1966 Sir Francis Drake Blvd; Fairfax, CA 94930
- Curator: Joe Breeze
- Website: https://mmbhof.org/

The Marin Museum of Bicycling is a bicycle museum located in Fairfax, California, dedicated to the history, culture, and innovation of bicycles. It serves as both an educational center and a tribute to cycling's evolution, with exhibits showcasing vintage bicycles, cutting-edge designs, and memorabilia from notable cyclists. The museum's grand opening celebration was on June 6, 2015.

One of the museum's highlights is the Mountain Bike Hall of Fame, which recognizes pioneers and significant contributors to the sport of mountain biking—a sport that has deep roots in Marin County. The Hall of Fame was founded in 1988 in Crested Butte, Colorado and relocated to Fairfax, California in 2014. It features historic mountain bikes, photographs, and stories of influential riders, advocates and innovators.

The museum is a 501(c)(3) non-profit organization. Joe Breeze is the current Head Curator.

== Collections ==
=== Igler Collection ===
The Igler Collection at the Marin Museum of Bicycling showcases the early evolution of 19th-century bicycles, documenting the birth and “Golden Age” of cycling. Originally assembled by Ralph Igler, a NASA engineer from Palo Alto, the collection was later inherited by his son and in 2014, the museum reached an agreement to display the collection.

The exhibit includes notable historic bicycles such as:

- 1868 velocipede – produced by Pierre Michaux, one of the earliest pedal-driven bicycles.
- 1880s Coventry Rotary tricycle – once the fastest human-powered vehicle.
- 1886 Rudge high-wheeler – one of the first implementations of modern ball bearings.
- 1898 Pierce shaft-drive bicycle – from the company that later produced the Pierce Arrow automobile.

=== Vintage Road Bike Collection ===
The Vintage Road Bike Collection at the Marin Museum of Bicycling showcases the evolution of lightweight, high-performance bicycles used for road racing and touring. Many of the museum’s road bikes feature steel frames from notable brands like Cinelli, BSA, and Raleigh. Visitors can see the progression of drivetrain technology, frame designs, and braking systems, including early derailleur systems developed by Tullio Campagnolo.

The exhibit includes notable historic road bicycles such as:

- 1963 Viking track bike raced by Beryl Burton.
- 2014 Specialized Tarmac on which Vincenzo Nibali won the 2014 Tour de France (on loan from Specialized).

=== Mountain Bike Hall of Fame Collection ===
The museum has expanded the Mountain Bike Hall of Fame Collection to include many key bikes in the evolution of the mountain bike, including influential mountain bike racing designs from Tom Ritchey, Charlie Cunningham, Gary Fisher, Klein, Specialized, and Cannondale. The exhibit roughly tracks the technological and commercial development of the sport.

After winning the 2018 UCI Mountain Bike World Championships, Marin county native Kate Courtney loaned her championship-winning bike to the museum. It is currently on display next to other world championship-winning bikes from Nino Schurter and Myles Rockwell.

The exhibit includes notable historic mountain bikes such as:

- Breezer Series 1, 1978 – the first purpose-built mountain bike
- Ritchey #1, 1979 – the first mountain bike from frame-builder, Tom Ritchey
- Cunningham CCProto, 1979 – the first aluminum mountain bike, built by Charlie Cunningham
- Cunningham R1 "Otto", 1983 – raced by 3-time Women’s National Champion, Jaqcuie Phelan

== Organization ==
The museum was founded in 2013 by Joe Breeze, Otis Guy, and Marc Vendetti, all of whom are Mountain Bike Hall of Fame inductees, along with Julia Violich, Keith Hastings, and Lena Estrella. The museum hired its first executive director, Aaron Allen, in December 2024. The location functions as a cycling cultural center as well as a museum. The museum is open Thursday through Sunday, 11 am - 5 pm.

Biketoberfest Marin is at the Marin Museum of Bicycling.
