= John Catlin =

John Catlin may refer to:

- John Catlin (golfer) (born 1990), American golfer
- John Catlin (politician) (1803–1874), American politician
- John C. Catlin (1871–1951), American lawyer and politician
