= Cushing Memorial Amphitheatre =

Open-air theater in California

Coordinates: 37°54′46″N 122°36′32″W

- Mountain Theatre
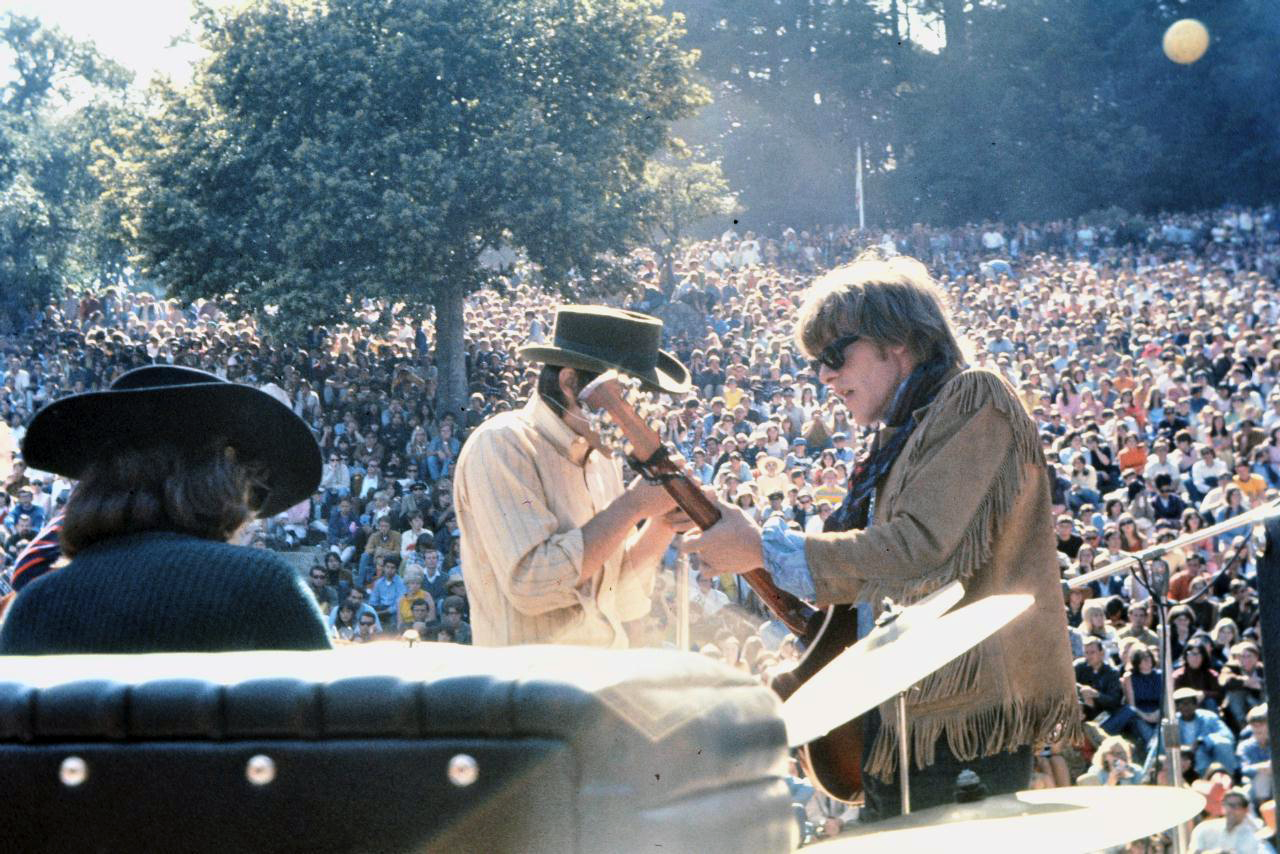
- Jefferson Airplane performing at the Fantasy Fair in 1967
- Interactive map of Cushing Memorial Amphitheatre
- Full name: Sidney B. Cushing Memorial Amphitheatre
- Location: Mount Tamalpais State Park, Marin County, California
- Seating type: Open-air
- Capacity: 4,000

Construction
- Opened: 1913

Website
- www.mountainplay.org

The Sidney B. Cushing Memorial Amphitheater, also known as the Cushing Memorial Amphitheater or simply the Mountain Theater, is a 4,000-seat open-air venue in Mount Tamalpais State Park, in Marin County, California, United States.

== History ==
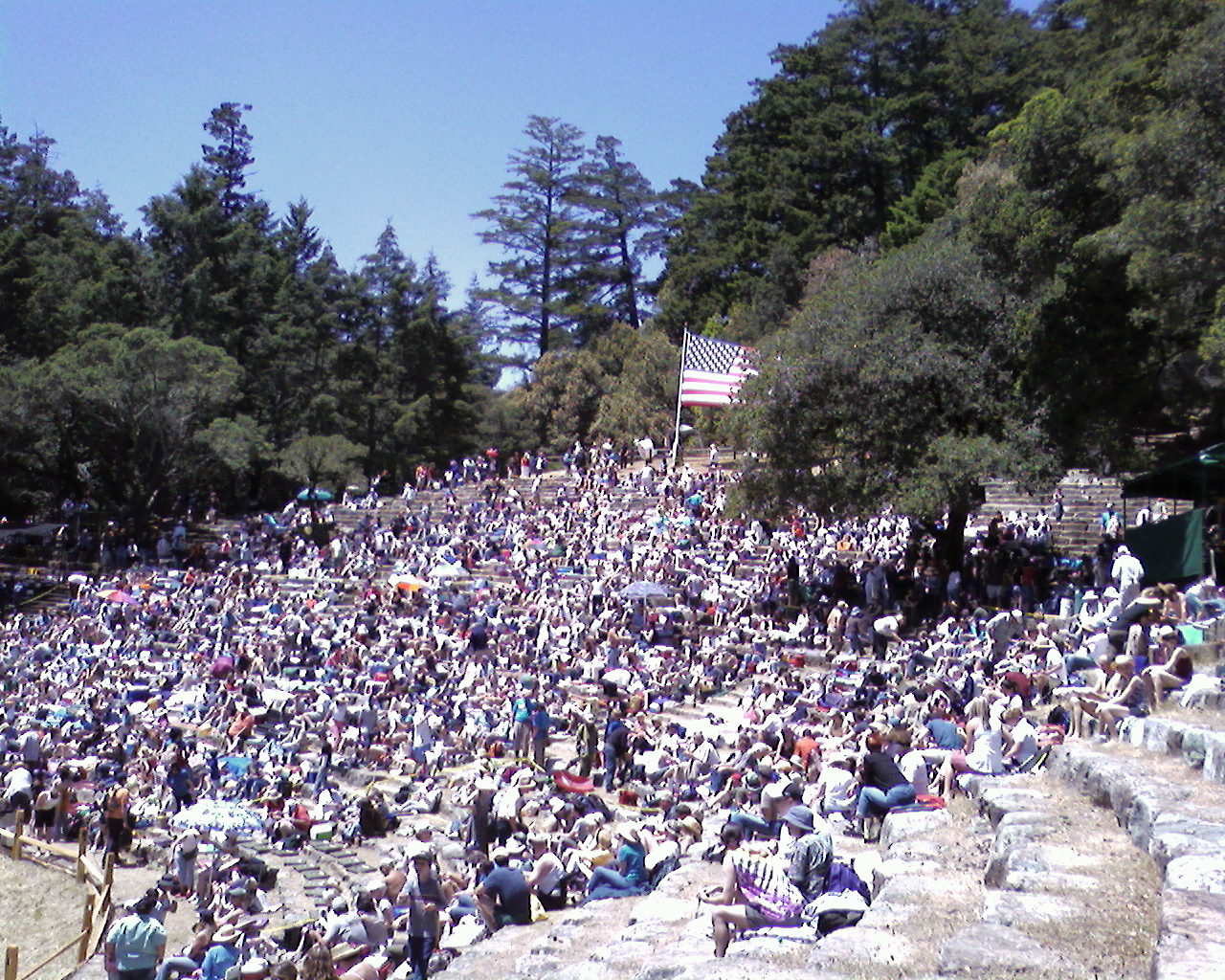
A large crowd at Cushing Memorial Amphitheater

Beginning in 1913 Mount Tamalpais had hosted theatrical performances known as Mountain Plays in a natural amphitheater setting 2,000 feet above sea level. John C. Catlin became the first president of the Mountain Play Association and financed its first play in the Cushing Memorial Amphitheater in 1913.

In the first two decades the performances were accessed by hiking or riding the winding Mount Tamalpais and Muir Woods Railway. The railway was led by businessman Sidney B. Cushing and, in 1933, the Civilian Conservation Corps began construction of a 4,000-seat stone amphitheater that was named the Sidney B. Cushing Memorial Amphitheater his honor. The amphitheater was constructed by the corps using massive serpentine rocks. In 1967 the venue hosted the two-day Fantasy Fair and Magic Mountain Music Festival, widely considered the first outdoor rock festival ever held during the Summer of Love. It hosts theatrical productions each year in the spring.

In response to the California State Parks budget crisis, on June 21, 2013, the Tamalpais Conservation Club hosted a benefit concert, Mount Tam Jam, produced by Michael Nash. This eight-hour festival resulted in a sell-out crowd under perfect weather conditions. The musical lineup included CAKE, Galactic, Taj Mahal, Mike Farris and the Roseland Rhythm Review, and Danny Click and the Hell Yeahs.

=== Sound Summit ===
In 2014, Michael Nash formed Roots & Branches Conservancy. Since 2015, the conservancy has produced Sound Summit at the Amphitheater, raising $200,000 for Mount Tamalpais State Park. The Sound Summit 2015 lineup included Tedeschi Trucks Band, Dr. John & The Nite Trippers, The Mother Hips, Portland Cello Project, The Mother Truckers, and Caroline Sky. Sound Summit 2016 featured Wilco, Los Lobos, Bill Frisell & Guitar In The Space Age, The Stone Foxes, and Matt Jaffe. Sound Summit 2017 celebrated the 50th Anniversary of the Magic Mountain Festival with performances by Bob Weir and Phil Lesh of the Grateful Dead, Jim James of My Morning Jacket, Preservation Hall Jazz Band, The Stone Foxes, Vetiver, and the Printz Dance Project. The Sound Summit 2018 featured jazz icon Herbie Hancock, Grace Potter, Bob Weir, Nikki Lane, Con Brio, and Amelia Einhorn. The event took a rest in 2019, and it was postponed in 2020 due to the COVID-19 pandemic. The following year, Sound Summit 2021 returned to a joyful and jubilant crowd with performances by Lukas Nelson & Promise of the Real, Father John Misty, Allah-Las, Cha Wa, Teal Collins, and Ray & Paul Holmberg.

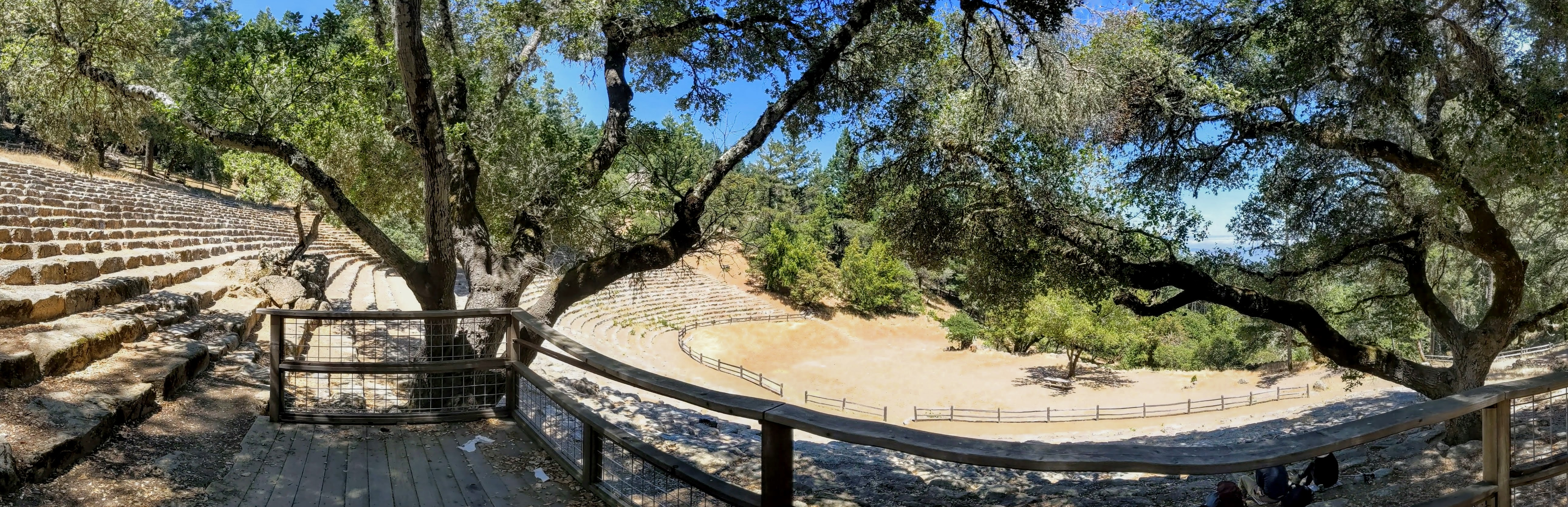
Panoramic view of the amphitheater
