= Mountain Play Association =

- Mount Tamalpais Mountain Theater; Sidney B. Cushing Memorial Amphitheatre
- U.S. National Register of Historic Places
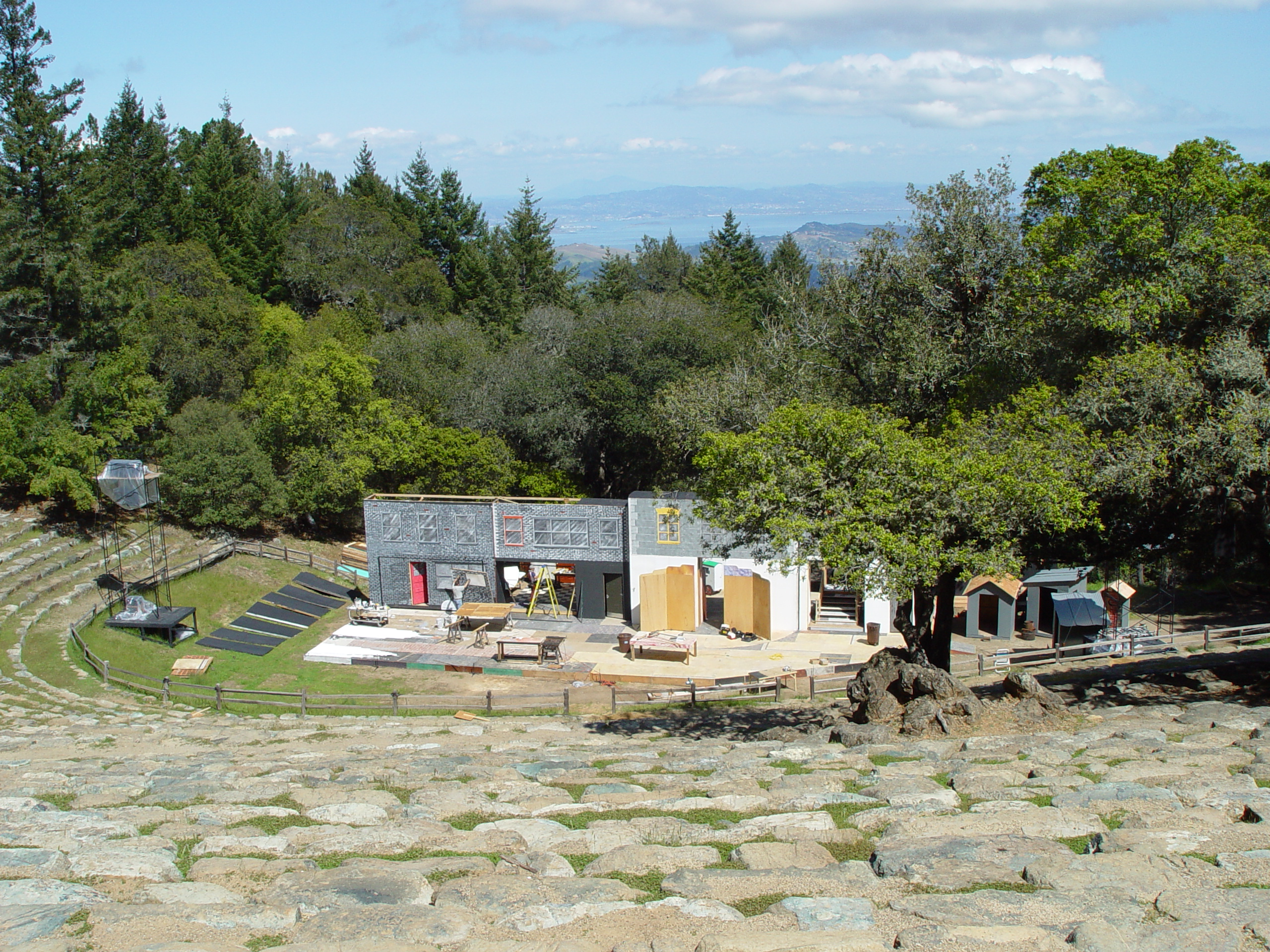
- The Mountain Play stage set up for a presentation of the musical Annie in 2003.
- Location: Mount Tamalpais State Park, 3801 Panoramic Hwy., Mill Valley, Marin County, California, United States
- Coordinates: 37.91258°N 122.60844°W
- Built: 1930s
- Architect: Emerson Knight
- Website: www.mountainplay.org
- NRHP reference No.: 14001234
- Added to NRHP: February 2, 2015

The Mountain Play Association (MPA, or Mountain Play) is a 501(c)3 organization responsible for the production of theatrical events at the Sidney B. Cushing Amphitheater (formerly the Mount Tamalpais Mountain Theater) within Mount Tamalpais State Park on Mount Tamalpais in Marin County, California, United States. The stone amphitheater, named for the owner of the railroad company which constructed the Mount Tamalpais Scenic Railway, is at an elevation of 2,000 feet and has 4,000 seats.

The organization was founded in 1913, and is a member of Theatre Bay Area and the North Bay Theatre Group. John C. Catlin became the first president of the Mountain Play Association. He financed the first play in the Cushing Memorial Amphitheatre in 1913. The Mountain Play presents one musical a year, in May and June. The mission statement of the Mountain Play Association reads, "The Mountain Play Association’s mission is to produce an annual, spectacular, outdoor theatrical experience that nurtures an appreciation of Mt. Tamalpais, involves and strengthens the community, and builds on decades of tradition."

The theater group venue was listed on the National Register of Historic Places on February 2, 2015, for architecture and cultural history.

== History ==
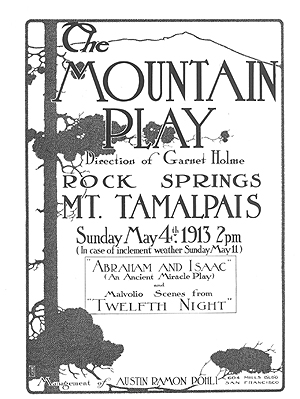
1913 poster

The organization was founded in 1913, and is a member of Theatre Bay Area and the North Bay Theatre Group. The venue was named for Sidney B. Cushing, the owner of the railroad company which constructed the Mount Tamalpais Scenic Railway. Prior to the 1930s and the construction of the open air amphitheatre, the audience sat on a bowl-shaped lawn. The venue is located just below the 2,571-foot East Peak.

=== First performance ===
One of the oldest non-profit theater companies in the area, the Mountain Play staged its first theatrical performances in the natural amphitheater on top of Mt. Tamalpais in Marin County in 1913. The first performance was financed by politician John C. Catlin, the first president of the Mountain Play Association. Congressman William Kent, who owned the land on the mountain where the amphitheater stood, was one of its vice presidents. Garnet Holme served as the theatre director, from 1913 until his death in 1929.

The first Mountain Play produced was Abraham and Isaac. Members of the audience hiked the eight miles from Mill Valley, or steamed up the mountain on the Mount Tamalpais and Muir Woods Railway, once billed as the "Crookedest Railroad in the World."

=== List of performances ===
Performance Dates	Year	Play(s)	Notes
May 21, 28; June 4, 10, 11, 18	2023	Into the Woods	
May 22, 29; June 5, 11, 12, 19	2022	Hello, Dolly!	
	2021	No play (theater closed for COVID-19 safety)	
	2020	No play (theater closed for COVID-19 safety)	
Summer	2019	Grease	
May 20, 27, June 3, 9, 10, 17	2018	Mamma Mia	
Summer	2017	Beauty and the Beast, and Hair	
Summer	2016	West Side Story	
Summer	2015	Peter Pan	
Summer	2014	South Pacific	
Summer	2013	The Sound of Music (100th anniversary)	
Summer	2012	The Music Man	
Summer	2011	Hairspray	
Summer	2010	Guys and Dolls	
Summer	2009	Man of La Mancha	
Summer	2008	Wizard of Oz	
Summer	2007	Hair	
Summer	2006	Fiddler on the Roof	
Summer	2005	Oklahoma!	
Summer	2004	My Fair Lady	
Summer	2003	Annie	
Summer	2002	Bye Bye Birdie	
Summer	2001	Oliver!	
Summer	2000	A Funny Thing Happened on the Way to the Forum	
Summer	1999	West Side Story	
Summer	1998	Hello, Dolly!	
Summer	1997	South Pacific	
Summer	1996	My Fair Lady	
Summer	1995	Guys & Dolls	
Summer	1994	Fiddler on the Roof	
Summer	1993	The Music Man	
Summer	1992	Oklahoma!	
Summer	1991	Wizard of Oz	
Summer	1990	Anything Goes	
Summer	1989	Brigadoon	
Summer	1988	South Pacific	
Summer	1987	King & I (75th Anniversary)	
Summer	1986	Peter Pan	
Summer	1985	The Sound of Music	
Summer	1984	Fiddler on the Roof	
Summer	1983	The Music Man	
Summer	1982	Oklahoma!	
Summer	1981	Annie Get Your Gun & Henry V	
Summer	1980	Carnival	
Summer	1979	Indians	
Summer	1978	Funny Thing Happened on the Way to the Forum	
Summer	1977	Clothes	
Summer	1976	Celebration '76 : American music and dance retrospective	
Summer	1975	Music of America	
Summer	1974	Rough an' Ready	
Summer	1973	Picnic and hike, guest of honor State Senator Peter Behr excerpts from Oklahoma! and Jacques Brel	
Summer	1972	Rough an' Ready	
Summer	1971	Playboy of the Western World	
Summer	1970	Tamalpa	
Summer	1969	The World We Live In	
Summer	1968	Alice Through the Looking Glass	
Summer	1967	Kismet	
Summer	1966	Peer Gynt	
Summer	1965	Rough an' Ready	
Summer	1964	Flamenca	
Summer	1963	Tamalpa	
Summer	1962	Rip of the Mountain	
Summer	1961	Robin Hood	
Summer	1960	Alice in Wonderland	
Summer	1959	The Pied Piper	
Summer	1958	Rough an' Ready	
Summer	1957	Tamalpa	
Summer	1956	The Birds	
Summer	1955	The World We Live In	
Summer	1954	The Tempest	
Summer	1953	Tamalpa	
Summer	1952	Land of Oz	
Summer	1951	A Thousand Years Ago	
Summer	1950	Robin Hood	
Summer	1949	Rough an' Ready	
Summer	1948	If I Were King	
Summer	1947	Alice in Wonderland	
Summer	1946	Tamalpa	
	1945	No play because the grounds were in use by U.S. Army	
	1944	No play because the grounds were in use by U.S. Army	
	1943	No play because the grounds were in use by U.S. Army	
	1942	No play because the grounds were in use by U.S. Army	
Summer	1941	A Thousand Years Ago	
Summer	1940	The World We Live In	
Summer	1939	The Valiant Cossack	
Summer	1938	Tamalpa	
Summer	1937	Thunder in Paradise	
Summer	1936	Androcles and the Lion	
Summer	1935	The World We Live In (from Ross Valley Players)	
Summer	1934	The Girl of the Golden West	
Summer	1933	The Daughter of Jorio	
Summer	1932	Rob Roy	
Summer	1931	The Trail of the Padres	
Summer	1930	The Sunken Bell	
Summer	1929	Peer Gynt	
Summer	1928	Flamenca	
Summer	1927	The Gods of the Mountain	
Summer	1926	Rip Van Winkle	
Summer	1925	Drake	
	1924	No play due to hoof and mouth disease epidemic	
Summer	1923	Tamalpa	
Summer	1922	The Pied Piper	
Summer	1921	Tamalpa	
Summer	1920	As You Like It	
Summer	1919	Tally-Ho	
Summer	1918	Robin Hood and The Three Kings	
Summer	1917	Jeppe-on-the-Hill	
Summer	1916	William Tell	
May	1915	Rip Van Winkle	
May	1914	Shakuntala	
Summer	1913	Abraham and Isaac	

== Sidney B. Cushing Memorial Amphitheater ==
In 1916, Kent deeded the theater to the MPA. Twenty years later, MPA turned the theater over to the Mount Tamalpais State Park, which then surrounded it. In the 1930s the Civilian Conservation Corps (CCC) worked to install the massive serpentine stones that now form the 4000-seat Sidney B. Cushing Memorial Amphitheater.

In 1930, the Mount Tamalpais and Muir Woods Railway stopped running. It was the site of the KFRC Fantasy Fair and Magic Mountain Music Festival, a historic rock music festival in June 1967.

Since 1977, when Marilyn Smith took over as executive director, the Mountain Play presented Broadway musicals on the mountain. In 2014, they presented South Pacific, from May 18 through June 15. Past productions have included Hairspray, Fiddler on the Roof, and Hair.

In 1980, the Mountain Play introduced sign language interpretation at its May performances on Mt. Tamalpais. In the early 1980s, special accommodations were developed for patrons with wheelchairs, including the grading of a path to the theater and the construction of a shaded wheelchair platform. In 1993, the Mountain Play expanded its 10-year-old programs for the visually impaired to include professional describers who provide simultaneous audio description. Equipment was upgraded in 1997, which enables users to sit anywhere in the theater rather than in a specially designated area.

A "Day on the Mountain" outreach program was introduced in 1993 to introduce low-income/at-risk children both to musical theater and to Mt. Tamalpais. Working with Bay Area social service agencies, the Mountain Play provides tickets and transportation to the show, pre-performance workshops and guided nature hikes on the mountain. Since 1995, the Mountain Play has also presented an annual performance at the Redwoods retirement center in Mill Valley for an audience of elderly patrons who can no longer make it up to the mountain.

== See also ==
- Marin Art and Garden Center
- National Register of Historic Places listings in Marin County, California
