= Francis Whitaker =

American blacksmith artist (1906–1999)

- Born: November 29, 1906; Woburn, Massachusetts, U.S.
- Died: October 23, 1999 (aged 92); Glenwood Springs, Colorado, U.S.
- Occupation: Blacksmith

Francis Whitaker (November 29, 1906 – October 23, 1999) was a blacksmith in Carmel-by-the-Sea, California, where he established The Forge in the Forest. He had The Mountain Forge, in Aspen, Colorado, which he later relocated when he was named an artist-in-residence at the Colorado Rocky Mountain School in Carbondale, Colorado.

== Early life ==
Whitaker was born in Woburn, Massachusetts, on November 29, 1906. His father, Charles Harris Whitaker (1872–1938) was the editor of a journal for the American Institute of Architects. His mother was Celia Huntington Rogers (1878–1960).

== Career ==
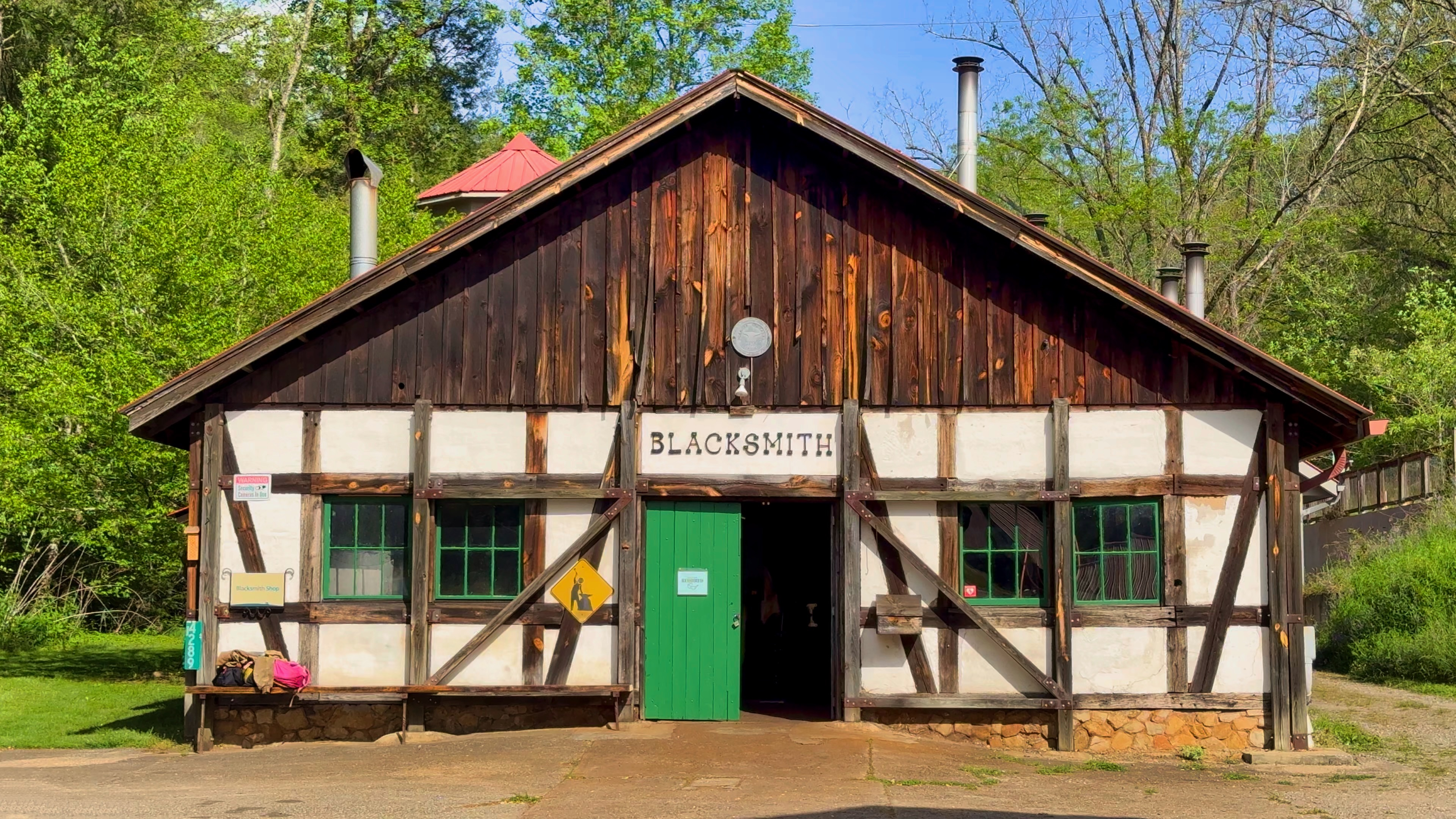
The Francis Whitaker Blacksmith Shop at the John C. Campbell Folk School

His training as a smith included a one-year apprenticeship under Philadelphia based blacksmith Samuel Yellin followed by a two-year apprenticeship under Julius Schramm in Berlin, Germany in the mid-1920s. Upon his return to the states in 1927, he began working as a smith in a career that spanned eight decades.

In 1928, M.J. Murphy designed and built the Francis Whitaker Cottage in Carmel-by-the-Sea, California. The American Craftsman-style cottage is located on the west side of Mission Street, the second house north of Vista Avenue.

By the 1930s, Whitaker had emerged as a "leading figure" in the Communist Party USA's John Reed Club for writers.

Whitaker completed the five engine bay doors and inside iron handrails for the Carmel Fire Station in 1937.

During World War II, Whitaker was hired by the US Navy to teach welding at Naval Base San Diego.

The Francis Whitaker Blacksmith Shop at the John C. Campbell Folk School is named in his honor. Whitaker taught classes at the school for decades and launched the folk school's annual fundraising auction.

Whitaker was friends with the blacksmith mayor John C. Catlin in Carmel. Whitaker operated the Forge in the Forest from 1940 to 1963. He made the wrought hardware for many of the historic buildings in Carmel. He worked on the dragon-headed wrought iron grille work at the Kocher Building in Carmel. The work is the best example of wrought iron work of Whitaker in the Monterey Peninsula. He became friends with authors John Steinbeck and Leon Uris in Carmel. They both created characters based on Whitaker in their books.

He served on the Carmel City Council for 13 years helping to preserve Big Sur and Point Lobos. When Whitaker left Carmel in 1963, the Forge became an artist's studio, then converted to a restaurant and saloon in the fall of 1970, called Forge in the Forest. Photographs of Whitaker and the original Forge building are on display inside the current Forge restaurant. He moved to Aspen, Colorado, where he opened the Mountain Forge. He gave workshops across the county and established two Francis Whitaker Schools. In 1986, he began teaching at Colorado Rocky Mountain School, a private school in Carbondale, Colorado where he established the Mountain Forge and worked until his death in 1999.

In 1976, Whitaker was awarded an honorary Doctorate of Humane Letters from the University of Colorado. In 1995, he received the Colorado Council on the Arts Governor's Award for Excellence in the Arts. In 1997, he received a National Heritage Fellowship from the National Endowment for the Arts, which is the United States government's highest honor in the folk and traditional arts.

== Death ==
Whitaker died, at age 92, on October 23, 1999, in Glenwood Springs, Colorado.

== Books ==
He wrote or co-wrote four books on blacksmithing.

- (1986) The Blacksmith's Cookbook: Recipes in Iron. Jim Fleming Publications. ISBN 0-939415-00-3
- (1995) My Life as an Artist-Blacksmith. F. Whitaker. ISBN 0-9646389-0-8
- (1997) Beautiful Iron: The Pursuit of Excellence by Francis Whitaker
- (2004) A Blacksmith's Craft: The Legacy of Francis Whitaker. Volume 1. by George F Dixon.
