= Amos P. Catlin =

American politician

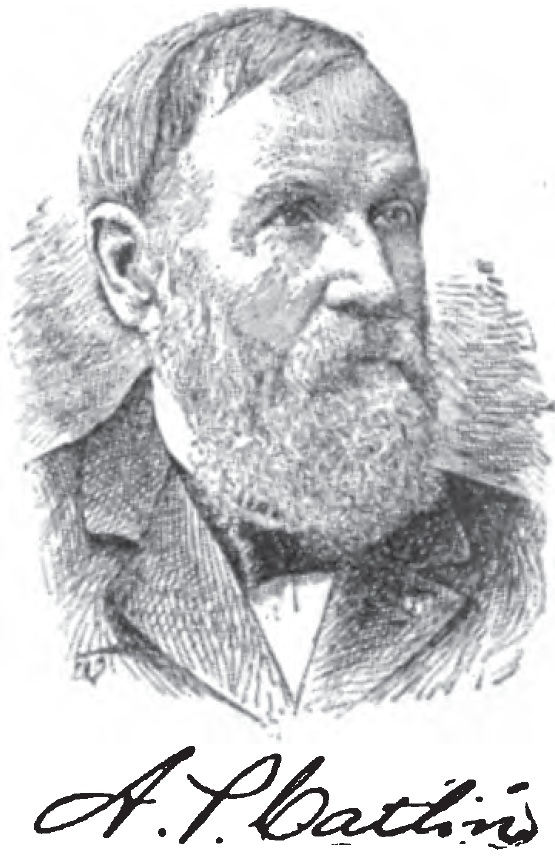
- Amos P. Catlin
- Born: January 25, 1823; Red Hook, New York, US
- Died: November 5, 1900 (aged 77); Sacramento, California, US
- Occupations: Lawyer; Politician
- Known for: Helping to establish Sacramento as the capital of California
- Spouse: Ruth A.C. Donaldson
- Children: 7

Amos Parmalee Catlin (25 January 1823 – 5 November 1900) was a California State Legislator and was instrumental in Sacramento becoming the capital of the State of California.

== Biography ==
Catlin was born in Red Hook, New York, to Mr. and Mrs. Pierce Catlin. His early education was in a private school in Litchfield County, Connecticut, and the Kingston Academy in Ulster County, New York. As a student, in 1841, he studied law in the office of Forsyth & Lindermau in Kingston, New York. In 1844, he was admitted to the bar of the New York Supreme Court. For four years, Catlin practiced law in New York City.

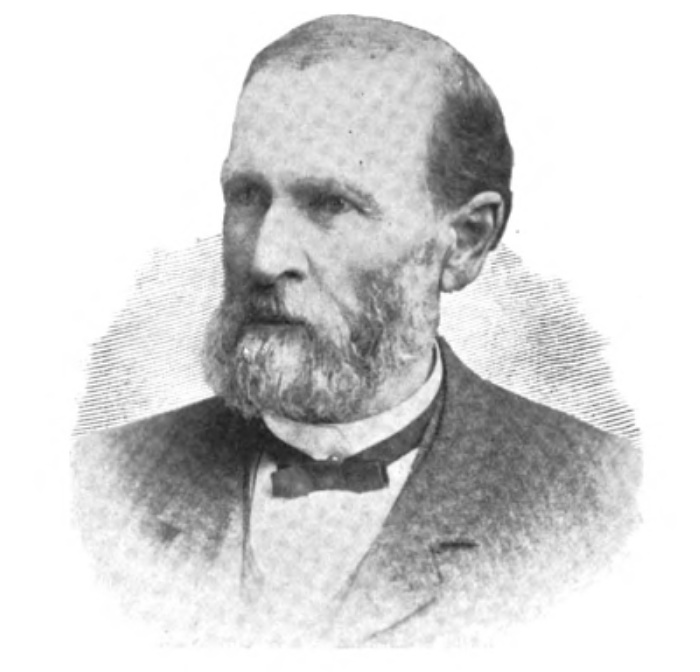
Amos P. Catlin

On January 8, 1849, Catlin traveled by ship from New York City to San Francisco. From there, he went to Mormon Island near Folsom, California. While living there, Catlin mined and practiced law. In 1850, he moved to Sacramento and began to practice law there. While living in Sacramento, Catlin witnessed the Squatters' Riot. Soon after, he returned to Mormon Island and resumed mining in the claims he had acquired previously in 1849. His practice in Mormon Island also resumed and he was hired to settle the affairs of the Connecticut Mining and Trading Company, which held interest in the famous store of Samuel Brannan. During his return to Mormon Island, William L. Goggin, agent for the Department of the Post Office on the west coast, asked Catlin for a name for the new post office being set up on Mormon Island. Catlin offered the name "Natoma", meaning clear water in the local native dialect. Catlin had already established the Natoma Mining Company to do his mining work. Once the post office was established in that area of Sacramento County, it became the Natoma Township. In 1860, Catlin married Ruth Anne Coningham Donaldson. They had seven children, including John Conyngham Catlin, who practiced law for more than thirty years and became mayor of Carmel-by-the-Sea, California from 1932-1934.

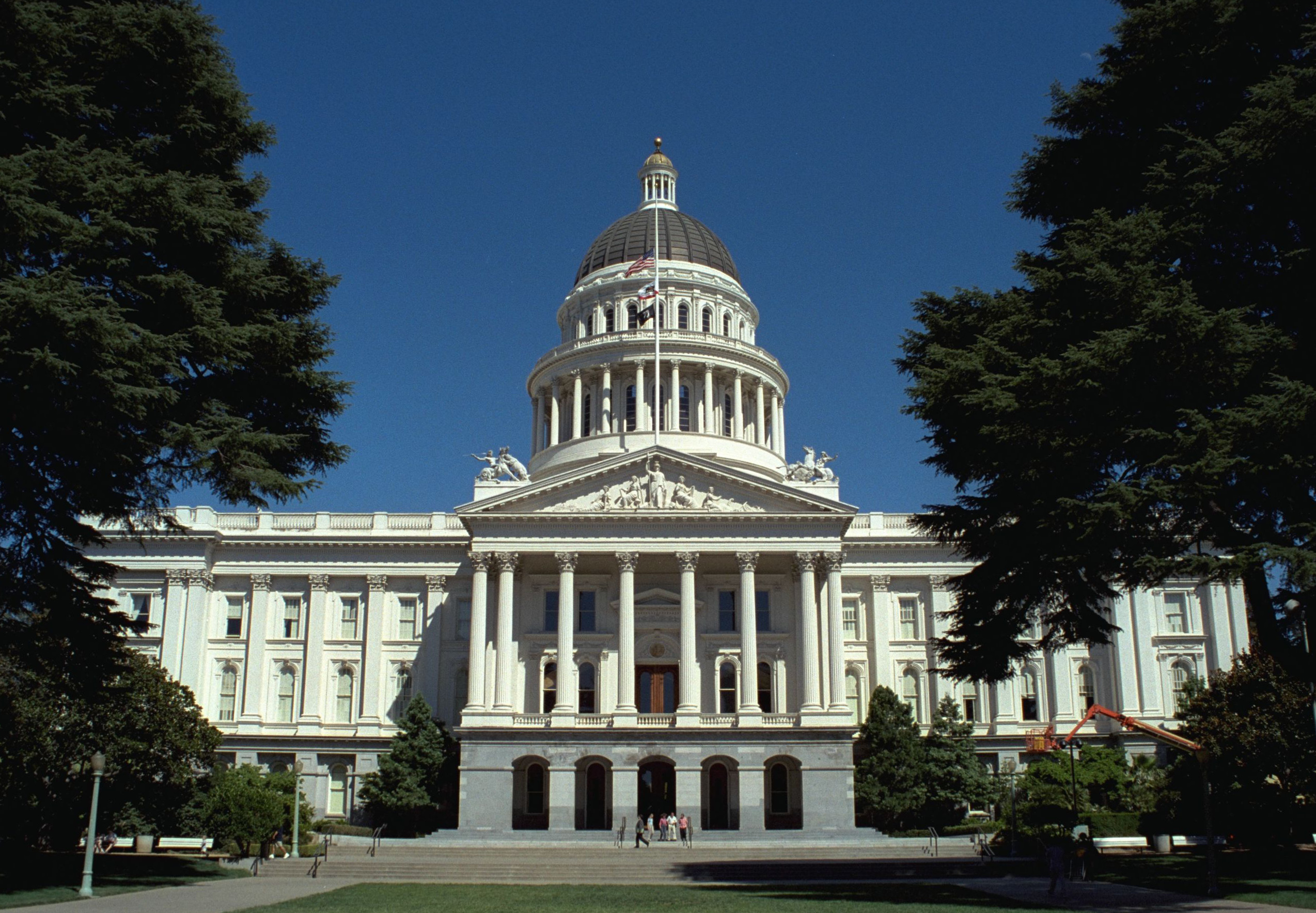
California State Capital in Sacramento

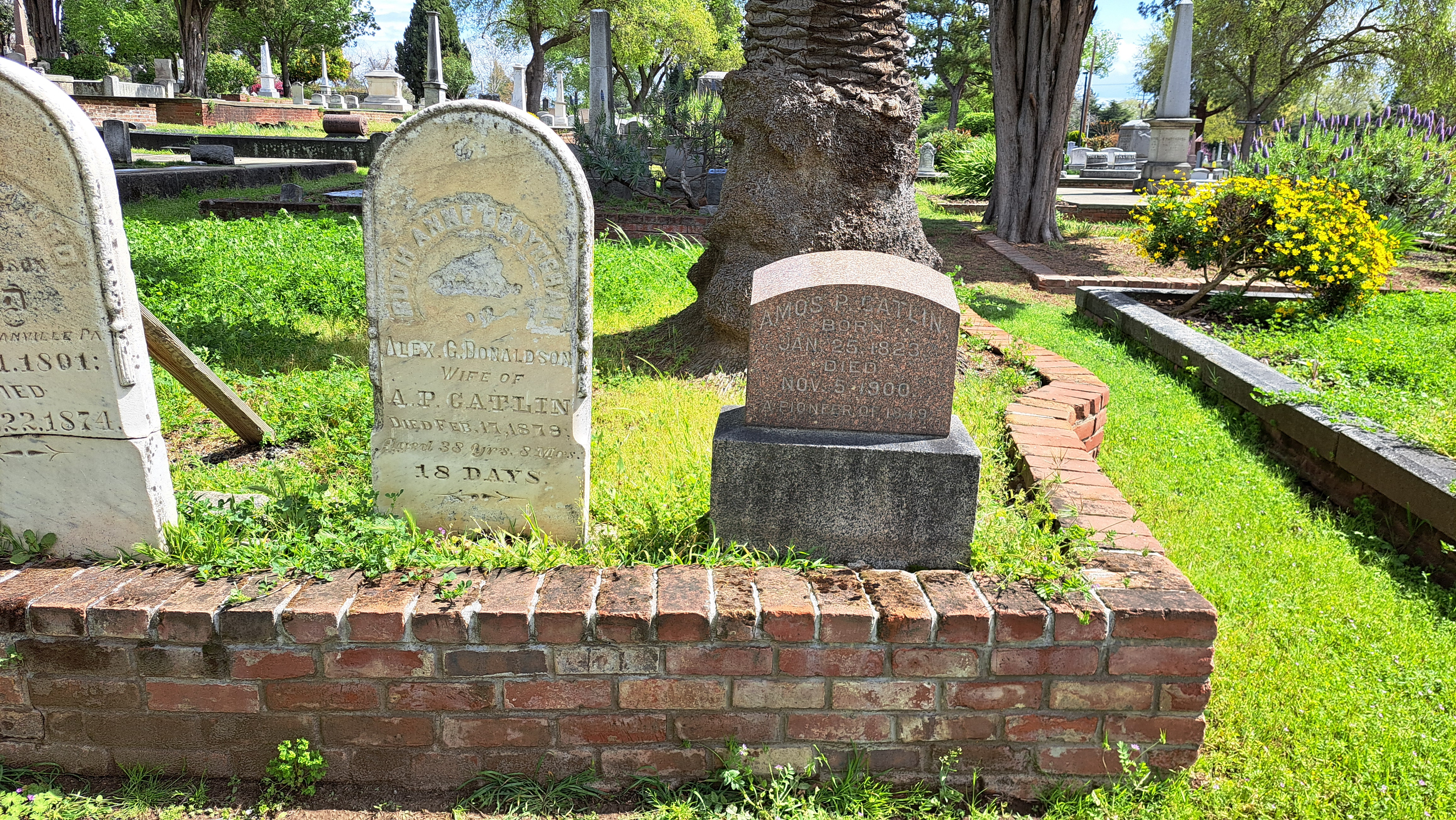
The grave of Amos Parmalee Catlin and his wife, Ruth Anne Coningham Donaldson, at the Sacramento Historic City Cemetery.

During his political career, Catlin was a member of the Whig Party, the Know Nothing Party and the Republican Party. In 1852, after a failed attempt at getting an Assembly seat, Catlin was elected to the State Senate. During his tenure as State Senator, he authored the law that made Sacramento the permanent seat of government in the State of California. In 1857, he was elected to the State Assembly for Sacramento County. In 1872, Catlin was appointed to be one of three members of the State Board of Equalization. He served in that capacity until 1876, when the Supreme Court of California declared most of the powers granted to the Board were unconstitutional and it was abolished. In 1875, Catlin was proposed as a candidate for Governor of California, but lost the nomination to John Bidwell. In 1890, Catlin was elected as a judge in the Superior Court of Sacramento County. He served until 1897 and then went back to his private practice.

=== Death ===
Catlin died November 5, 1900, in Sacramento, California. Catlin is interred, along with his wife who died in 1878, in the Sacramento Historic City Cemetery.
