= Edgewood Botanic Garden =

Botanical garden

Coordinates: 37.90280°N 122.55988°W

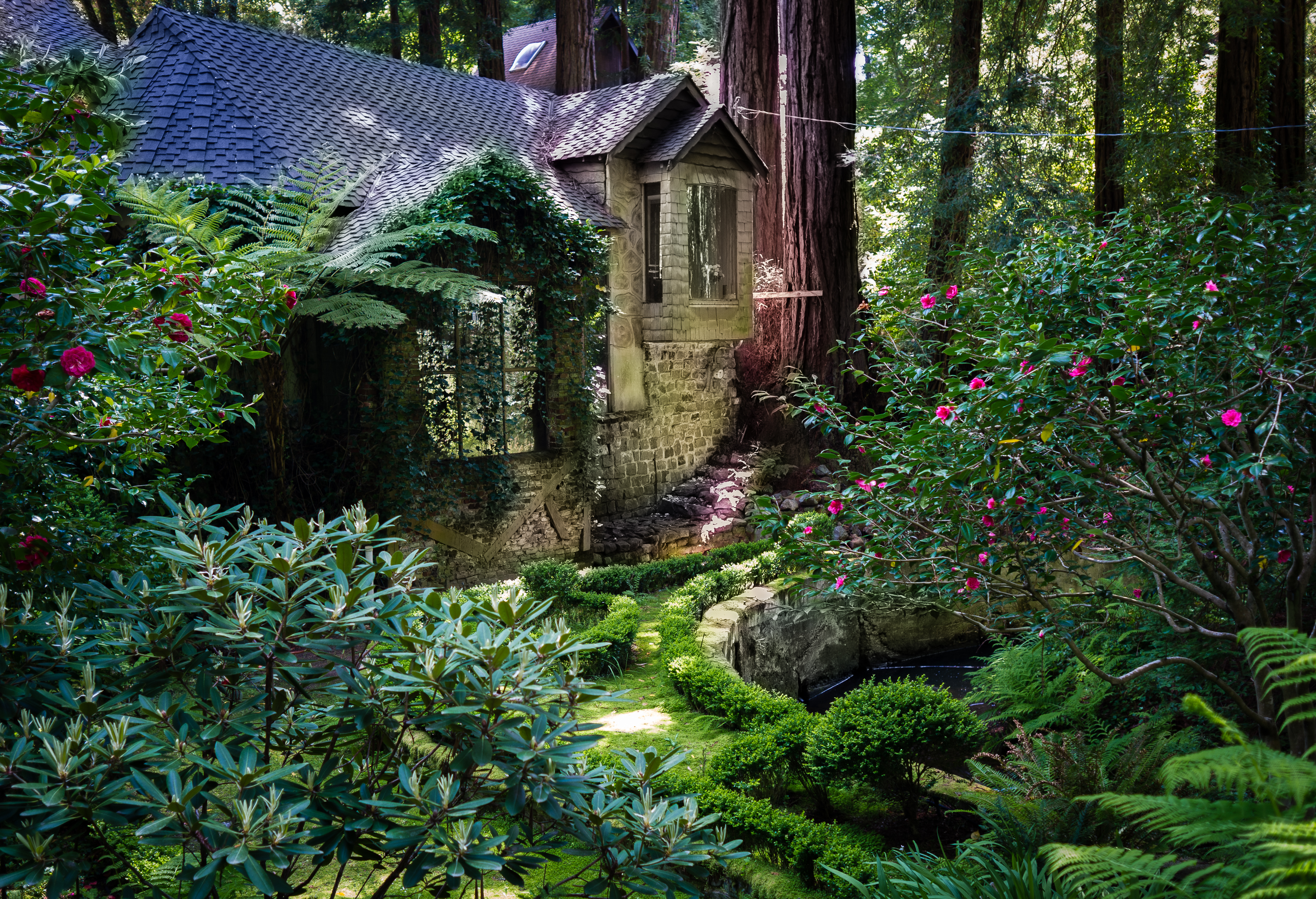

The Edgewood Botanic Garden is a small botanical garden of less than 1 acre (0.4 ha) on the southeastern side of Mount Tamalpais, in Mill Valley, Marin County, California. It is located at 436 Edgewood Avenue, near the intersection with Cypress Avenue in Mill Valley.

The botanical garden is dedicated to the native plants of the region. It is not actively maintained currently.

The native Coast redwood trees (Sequoia sempervirens) dominate the local landscape. It also has about ten species of other trees, either locally native or from other California Coast Ranges habitats.

== See also ==
- List of California native plants
- List of botanical gardens in the United States
- Natural history of the California Coast Ranges
