= John C. Catlin =

American politician

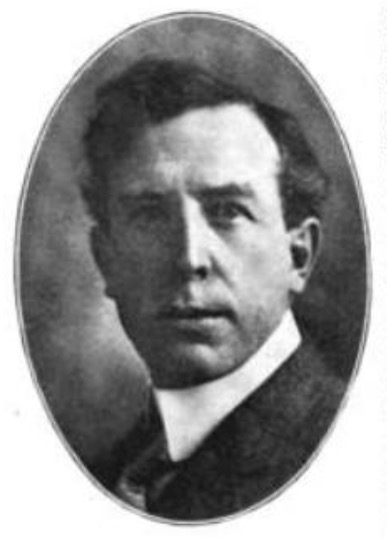
- John C. Catlin

10th Mayor of Carmel-by-the-Sea
- In office 1932–1934
- Preceded by: Herbert Heron
- Succeeded by: James H. Thoburn

Personal details
- Born: John Conyngham Catlin; March 12, 1871; Sacramento, California, US
- Died: July 9, 1951 (aged 80); Carmel-by-the-Sea, California, US
- Political party: Republican
- Spouse: Lucy DeBaugh Routier
- Children: 1
- Occupation: Lawyer; Politician
- Known for: Mayor of Carmel-by-the-Sea, California

John Conyngham Catlin (March 12, 1871 – July 9, 1951) was an American lawyer and politician. He practiced law for more than thirty years, in Sacramento, San Francisco, and for a short time in Alaska. He was a former mayor of Carmel-by-the-Sea, California from 1932-1934, and served on the Carmel City Council in 1934.

== Early life ==
Catlin was born in Sacramento, California, to California State Legislator Amos P. Catlin (1823-1900) and Ruth Anne Coningham Donaldson (1838-1878), pioneers of the California Gold Rush. His father started a law firm in Sacramento, California in 1850. As a young boy, he knew John Sutter, Sacramento's founder; James W. Marshall, discoverer of gold; Edwin B. Crocker and Leland Stanford, who pioneered the western portion of the first transcontinental railroad; and John Bidwell, founder the city of Chico, California. He attended University of California, Berkeley in the late 1880s. He married Lucy DeBaugh Routier (1878-1906) on March 15, 1895, in Sacramento, and had a daughter. His wife died in 1906.

== Career ==
=== Law practice ===
In July 1892, Catlin was admitted to the bar of San Francisco and established a law practice in Sacramento until 1899. He worked at different law firms, including for a short time in Alaska in 1898 during the Klondike Gold Rush. By 1906, he became a senior member of the firm of Catlin & Catlin at 628 Montgomery Street, San Francisco, with his brother Hairy C. Catlin.

Catlin became the first president of the Mountain Play Association and financed its first play in the Cushing Memorial Amphitheatre in Marin County, California in 1913. He knew American writer and actor Perry Newberry in San Francisco in 1915, when they were on the board of the Children's Theater. Catlin's daughter, Lucy R. Catlin (1895-1949) was the theater's secretary.

=== Move to Carmel-by-the-Sea ===
At age 56, Catlin retired as a lawyer in 1922, and moved to Carmel-by-the-Sea, California. He was an expert horseman, and to earn extra money he worked as the riding master at the Carmel School of Riding and Saddle Livery on Ocean Avenue and Junipero Street.

Once an attorney with a temperament clanging at words and bending juries to his will; now artistic smithy with a forge clanging on iron and bending beautiful curves in red hot metal. Picturesque this Forge In The Forest, the man and his work. John Catlin is founder of the famous Mountain Theater on Mt. Tamalpais

— Carmel Pine Cone

In 1925, Catlin assisted Herbert Heron at the Forest Theater. Catlin, Una Jeffers, and others created sets for the Forest Theater's production of Hamlet in 1926.

=== Forge in the Forest ===
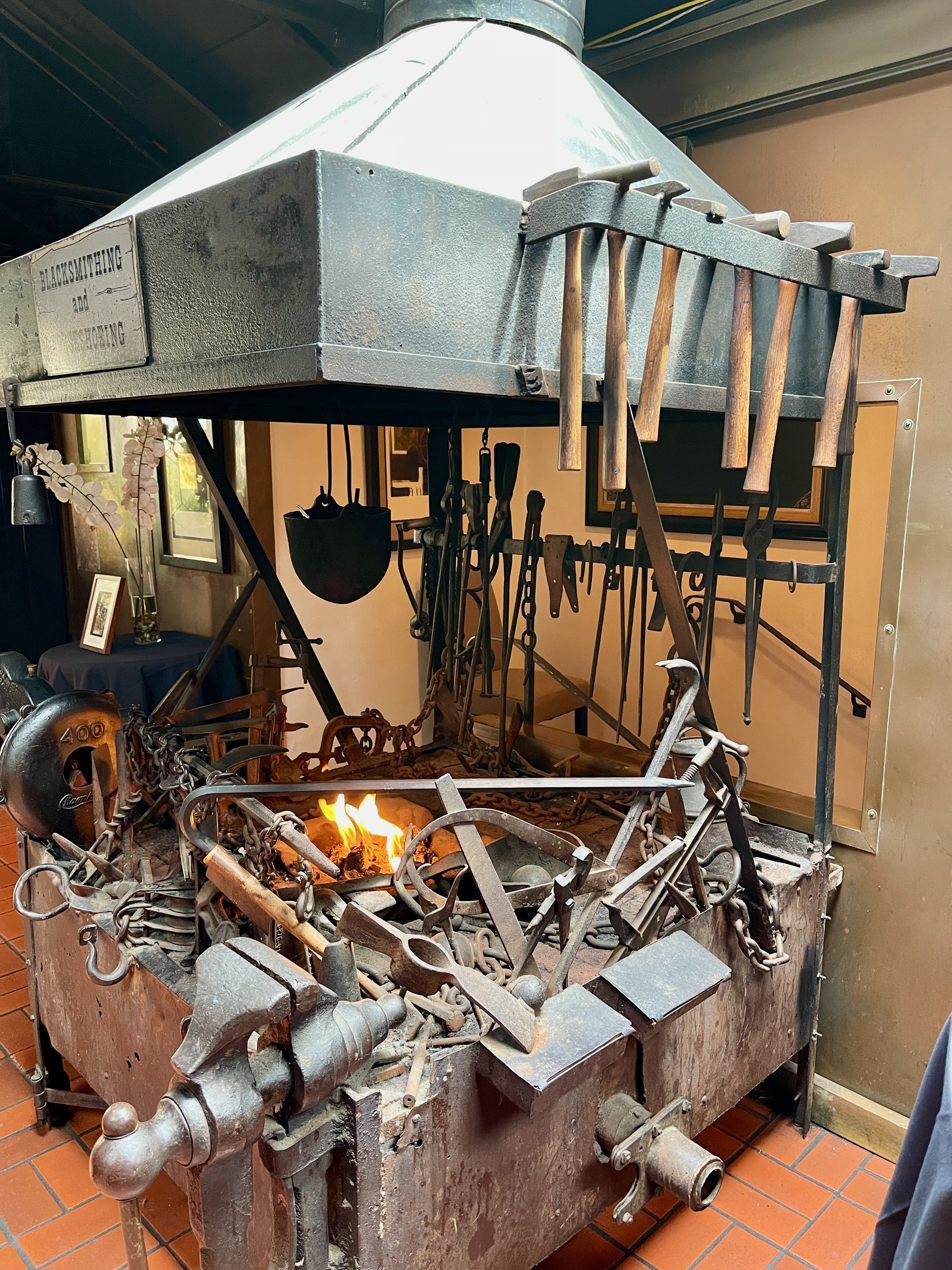
The forge at the Forge in the Forest restaurant in Carmel-by-the-Sea.

Catlin built the original Forge in the Forest home at 6th Avenue and Junipero Street with a small blacksmith shop in the garage in 1926. He became a blacksmith at the forge, which he called Forge in the Forest. Catlin made his wrought iron designs at the forge. Catlin was friends with artist and blacksmith Francis Whitaker that operated the Forge from 1940 to 1963. Artist Paul Whitman was friends with Whitaker and did a watercolor of him at the forge in his Carmel workshop in 1935.

The Forge was moved to its present location on the corner of 5th Avenue and Junipero Street, when builder Hugh W. Comstock remodeled the Forge in 1940 at a cost of $1,200 (equivalent to $26,933 in 2024). Whitaker made the wrought hardware for many of the historic buildings in Carmel. He also served on the Carmel City Council for 13 years. When Whitaker left Carmel in the mid-1960s, the Forge became an artist's studio.

The Forge was converted to a restaurant and saloon in the fall of 1970, called Forge in the Forest. Photographs of Whitaker and the original Forge building are on display inside the current Forge restaurant.

=== Blacksmith mayor of Carmel ===
Catlin was a candidate for city councilman in 1928 and 1930. He became mayor of Carmel from 1932-1934 and succeeded poet mayor Herbert Heron.

His election as mayor was during the Great Depression and the Prohibition. Catlin was successful to overturn a law enforced by the Carmel Development Company that profited alcohol consumption for property owners. He served on Carmel's city council in 1934.

== Death ==
Catlin died on July 9, 1951, at age 81, in Carmel-by-the-Sea after a brief illness. Funeral services were private at the Dorney and Farlinger mortuary in Monterey.

== List of publications ==
- Nicodemus: A Miracle Play
- Nicodemus: Catlin's Negotiable Instruments
