= Mount Tamalpais State Park =

Forested land preserve in Marin County, California

- IUCN category III (natural monument or feature)
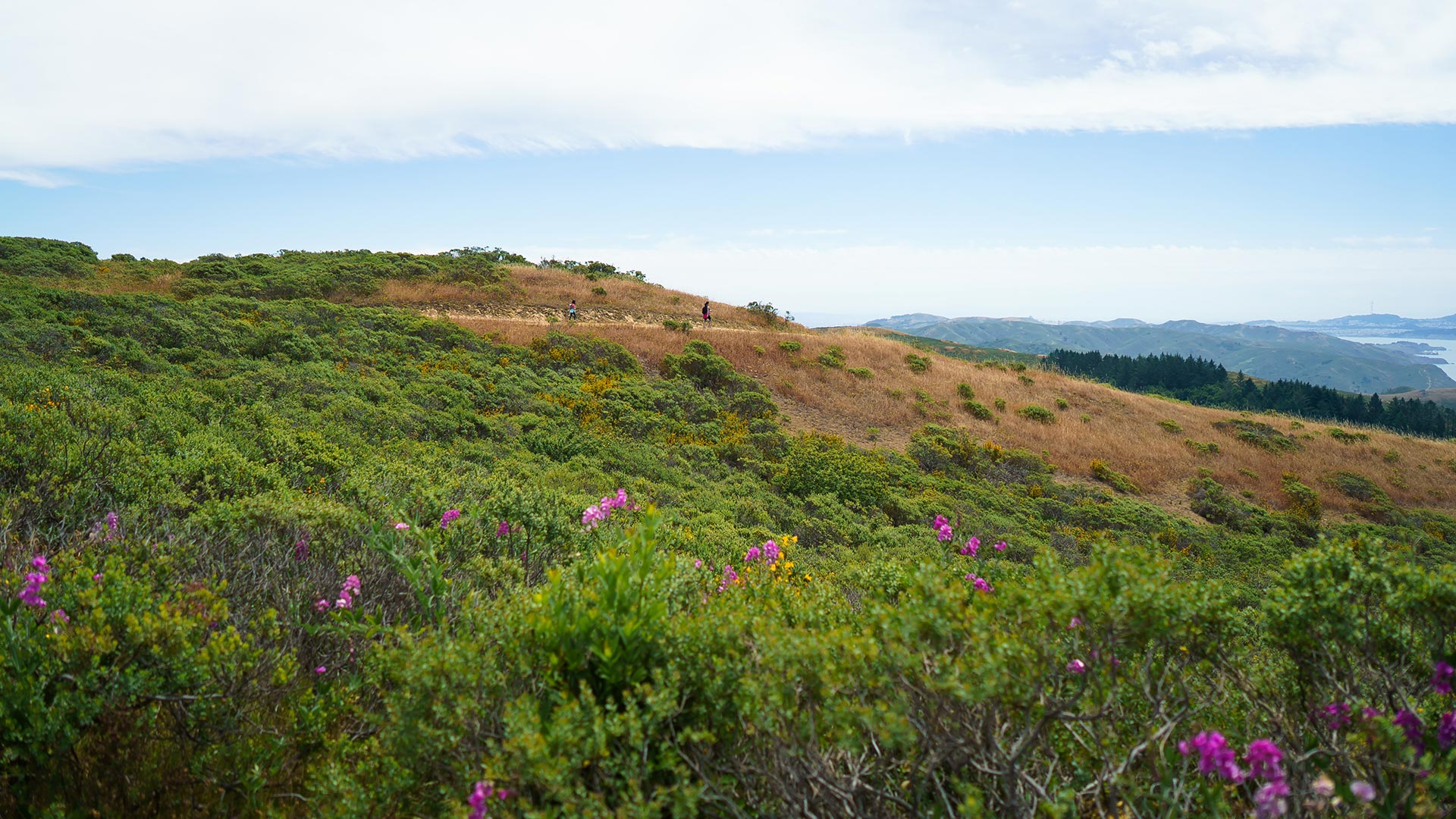

- Location within the United States
- Location: Marin County, California, United States
- Nearest city: Mill Valley, CA
- Coordinates: 37°55′26″N 122°35′48″W
- Area: 6,300 acres (25 km^{2})
- Visitors: 564,000 (in 2003)
- Governing body: CA Dept. of Parks & Recreation
- Website: Official website

Mount Tamalpais State Park is a California state park, located in Marin County, California. The primary feature of the park is the 2,571 feet (784 m) Mount Tamalpais. The park contains mostly redwood and oak forests. The mountain itself covers around 25,000 acres (100 km^{2}). There are about 60 miles (97 km) of hiking trails, which are connected to a larger, 200-mile (320 km) network of trails in neighboring public lands. The park received 564,000 visitors as of 2003. Muir Woods National Monument is surrounded by the state park.

From the peak of the mountain, visitors can see up to 25 miles (40 km), in a view that encompasses San Francisco, most of the North and East Bay, and the Farallon Islands. Occasionally, the Sierra Nevada are visible, 125 miles (201 km) away.

== Cushing Memorial Amphitheatre ==
The Cushing Memorial Theater, also known as the Mountain Theater, is an open-air theater built in the 1930s. The natural-stone amphitheater seats 4,000 people and features the Mountain Play each spring, produced every year since 1913. In the summer, monthly astronomy programs are held in the theater for free to the public.

== See also ==
- Mount Tamalpais and Muir Woods Railway
- List of beaches in California
- List of California state parks
