= Dogtown, Marin County, California =

Unincorporated community in California, United States

Dogtown Woodville
- Unincorporated community
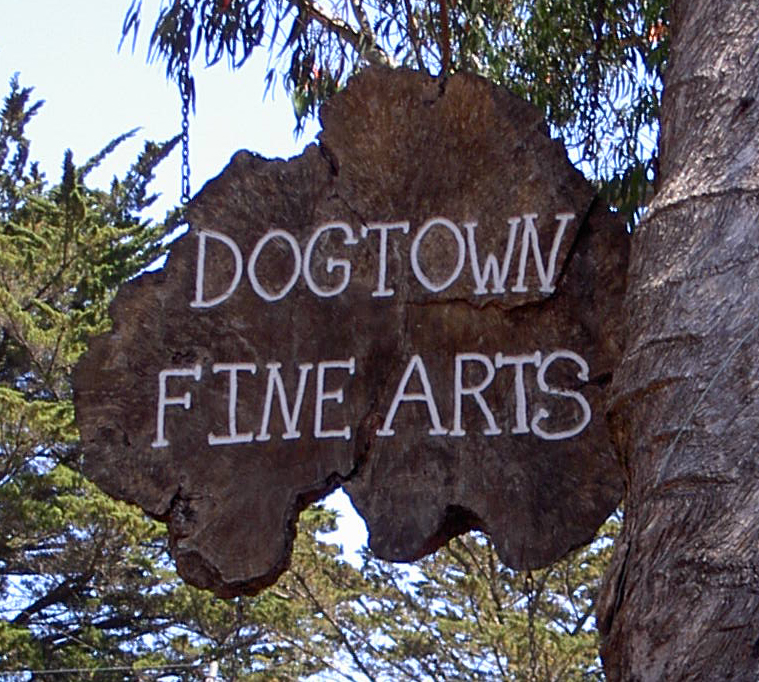
- A "Dogtown Fine Arts" sign outside a studio in Dogtown

- Location in California Dogtown (the United States)
- Coordinates: 37°56′41″N 122°42′23″W
- Country: United States
- State: California
- County: Marin

Government
  - County Board: District 4 Dennis Rodoni
  - State Senate: Mark Leno (D)
  - Assembly: Stephanie Nguyen (D)
  - U. S. Congress: Jared Huffman (D)
- Elevation: 187 ft (57 m)

Population (2007)
  - Total: 30
- Time zone: UTC−8 (PST)
  - Summer (DST): UTC−7 (PDT)
- ZIP code: 94924
- Area codes: 415/628

Dogtown (originally named Woodville) is an unincorporated community in the rural West Marin region of coastal Marin County, California, United States in the San Francisco Bay Area's North Bay. It lies at an elevation of 187 feet (57 m). With a population of 30, the town is located beside the Golden Gate National Recreation Area and Point Reyes National Seashore, in the Olema Valley west of the Bolinas Ridge mountain range.

== History ==
The village, founded by miners and lumberjacks, is located within the original Rancho Punta de los Reyes Sobrante land grant. It was a stagecoach stop along the north–south route. The village includes the historic Nelson Hotel, which was connected by the old North Pacific Coast Railroad to the Bolinas Station, en route to Point Reyes. That railway ran between Mendocino County and a ferry service to San Francisco at Sausalito. The hotel, with nearby guest houses, was later used by the U.S. Army during both World Wars as barracks. There was also a K-8 school, with about 50 pupils. The schoolhouse was located south of the village towards Bolinas, the nearest town. An early 20th-century pastime was a trip and picnic to the Copper Mine Gulch, which runs through the town.

The town was originally known as Woodville due to its timber industry, although the sawmills closed by the 1870s. The name was changed to Dogtown, as that was a popular name among locals. Until the name change, the hamlet was simply nicknamed "The Dogtown" by Bolinas residents, because the town's residents kept a large number of hunting dogs. The location continues to be labeled "Woodville" on some maps.

The area's economy is agricultural and tourism-based.

== Education ==
Dogtown is in the Bolinas-Stinson Union School District which provides K-8 education, and the Tamalpais Union High School District. Students attend Tamalpais High School in Mill Valley after 8th grade.

== Transportation ==
The town is accessible by State Route 1, marked as "Shoreline Highway Road" locally, which runs through the community; north to Point Reyes Station and south to Stinson Beach.

There is limited Marin Transit West Marin Stagecoach (route 61e) bus service between Point Reyes Station, Dogtown, Bolinas, and Mill Valley (with some trips to Marin City). The service provides 4 daily round trips on Wednesdays and Fridays. Some students use it to get to Tamalpais High School on the days it operates; these students are some of the service's key users. There is also service on route 62 from Point Reyes Station to Stinson Beach, with one trip continuing as route 68 from Point Reyes Station to the county seat San Rafael through Lagintas-Forest Knolls, San Anselmo and other communities in the San Geronimo Valley.

Due to the town's geographic isolation, residents are, in most cases, taken to hospitals by helicopter instead of by ambulance in emergencies.
