= Rancho San Geronimo (Cacho) =

- Rancho
- Location within California
- Coordinates: 38.010°N 122.680°W
- Divided into: San Geronimo Woodacre Forest Knolls Lagunitas
- Squatted by Rafael Cacho: 1839
- Officially seized by Rafael Cacho during the Mexican-American War: 1844
- Divided: 1914

Rancho San Geronimo was a 8,701-acre (35.21 km^{2}) Mexican land grant in present-day Marin County, California given in 1844 by Governor Manuel Micheltorena to Rafael Cacho. The grant extended along San Geronimo Creek.

After decades of sale between landowners, the land was purchased by the Lagunitas Development Company who divided the rural land into Woodacre, San Geronimo, Forest Knolls, and Lagunitas, leading to its gradual suburbanization in the mid-20th century.

Despite its development, the Rancho "has managed to maintain its rural character, despite many threats of major development."

== History ==
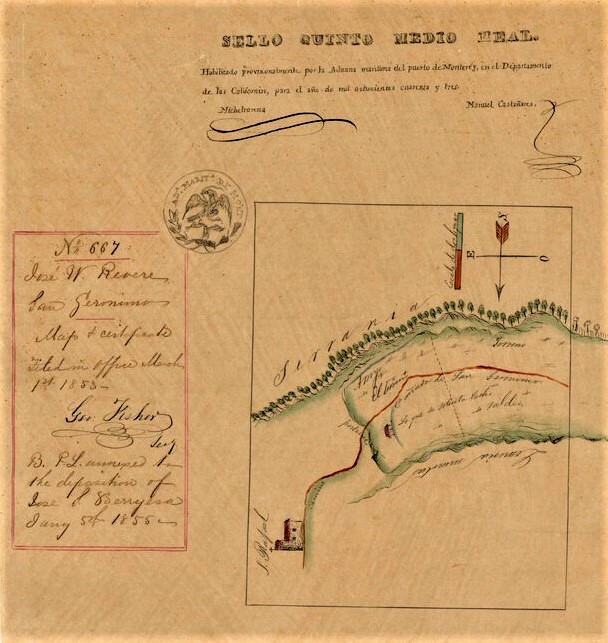
1855 contract involving Joseph Warren Revere, including an illustration of the Rancho's land acreage.

In 1839, military officer Rafael Cacho began living on land in the San Geronimo Valley. Five years later, in 1844, Governor Manuel Micheltorena granted the land to Cacho.

In 1846, Cacho sold Rancho San Geronimo to Joseph Warren Revere, a leader of the American invasion of Alta California, after which Americans seized lands from Californios.

With the cession of California to the United States following the Mexican-American War, the 1848 Treaty of Guadalupe Hidalgo provided that the land grants would be honored. As required by the Land Act of 1851, a claim for Rancho San Geronimo was filed with the Public Land Commission in 1852, and the grant was patented to Joseph Warren Revere in 1860.

Circa 1849, Joseph Warren Revere invited Rodman M. Price to his San Geronimo ranch. Price was impressed with Revere's management of the land and the profit it accrued. On December 28, 1849, Price paid Revere $7,500 to purchase half the land, with $2,500 up front (the deadline for the remaining expenses being January 1, 1851). The two would split the profits of timber exports from the property.

In 1850, Revere left California for Mexico, and on August 6. 1851, Price bought the remainder of Revere's property for $8,000. Revere moved to Morristown, New Jersey the following year, where he constructed his Gothic Revival estate, The Willows.

In 1851, Price returned to New Jersey, where he was elected to Congress and later elected Governor, and hired Lorenzo E. White to manage the rancho until 1855.

M. Hall McAllister, renowned San Francisco attorney and orator, bought another part of Rancho San Geronimo in 1854. Samuel Cutler Ward and his two cousins M. Hall McAllister (1826–1888) and Ward McAllister (1827–1895) joined the gold rush in 1849. Six months after his arrival in San Francisco, he returned to New York City with a newly acquired fortune. There he met financial failure, and returned to California in 1851, where he remained for the next five years.

In 1846, Adolph Mailliard (1819–1896) married Annie Eliza Ward (1824–1895), sister of Samuel Ward and of Julia Ward Howe. Mailliard came to California in 1868 and bought Rancho San Geronimo. The Mailliard family owned the property until the 1910s.

== Legacy ==
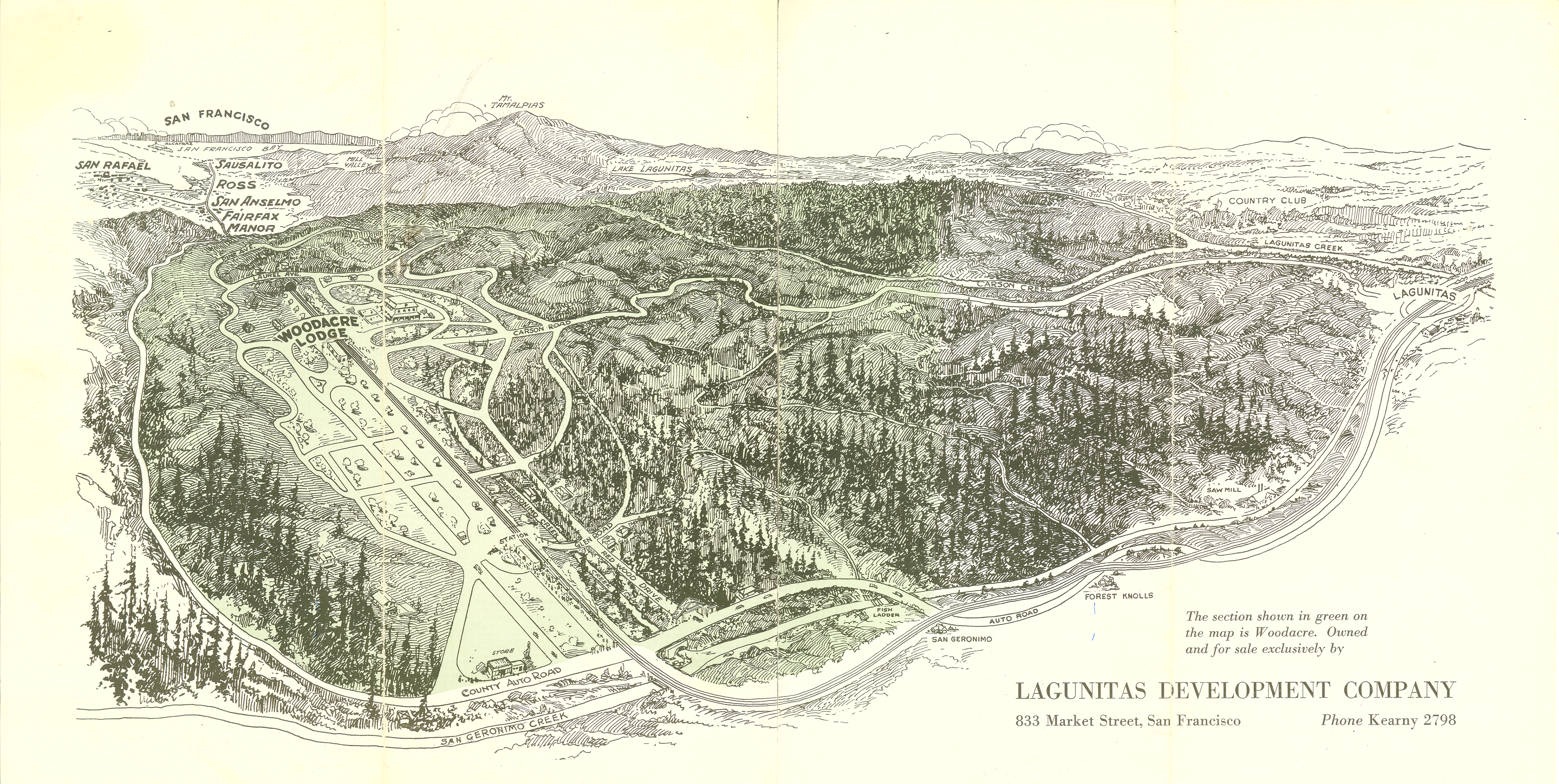
Circa 1914 promotional art of Rancho San Geronimo by the Lagunitas Development Company. San Francisco and Mt. Tamalpais can be seen in the background.

Circa 1914, the Lagunitas Development Company purchased the acreage and divided it into present-day Woodacre, San Geronimo, Forest Knolls, and Lagunitas. The population grew slowly, mostly consisting of summer homes, until its suburban development in the early 1950s. A demographic shift occurred a decade later, wherein "an exodus of progressive young people from San Francisco changed the character of the area once again."

Nevertheless, as of 2021, the San Geronimo Valley Historical Society claims the Rancho "has managed to maintain its rural character, despite many threats of major development."

Circa 2017, the SGVHS began a compilation of memoirs related to the area, written by residents and former residents.

In 2020, the SGVHS began an oral history project, conducting monthly interviews with longtime Valley residents, supported by the Marin County Free Library. As of 2022, the SGVHS hosts 3 walking/driving tours in the summer, as well as monthly concerts in historic homes of the area.

== See also ==
- List of ranchos of California
