= Archie Williams High School =

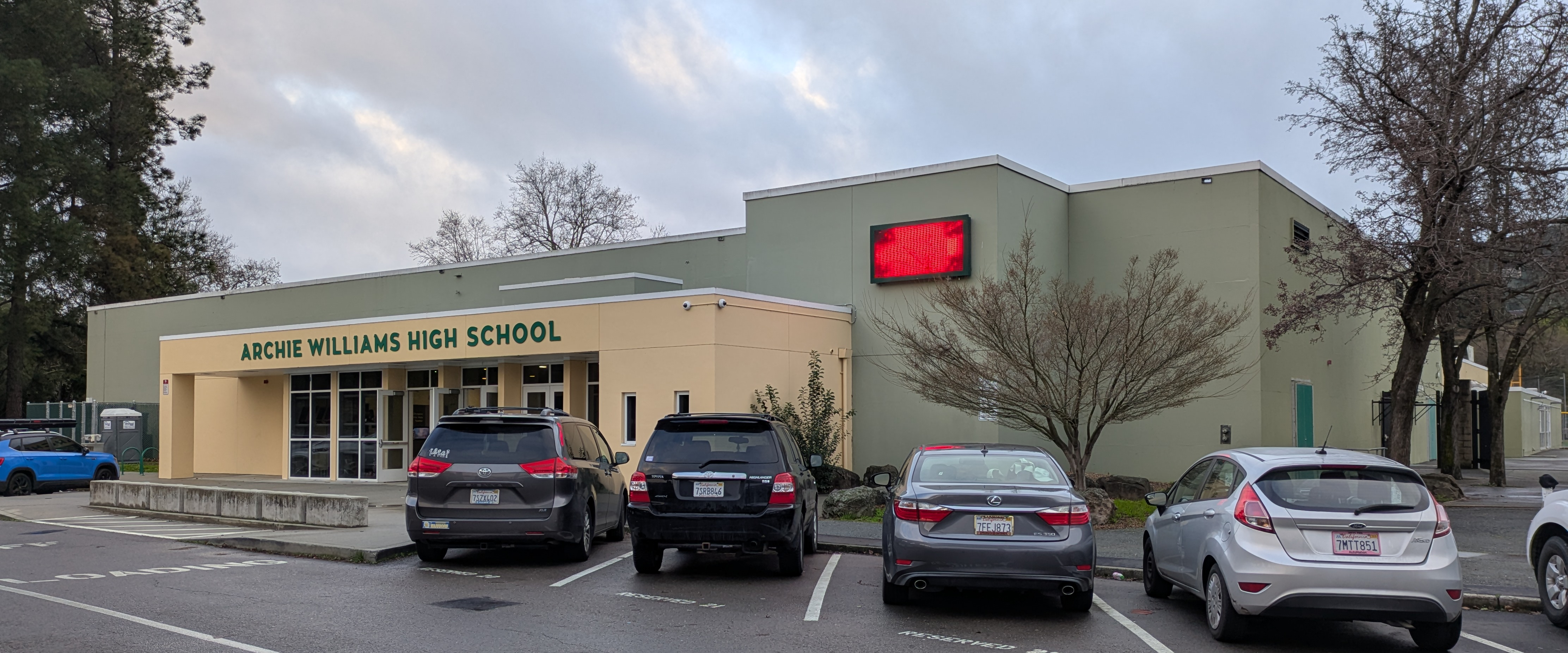

Location
- 1327 Sir Francis Drake Boulevard; San Anselmo, California 94960; 37°59′01″N 122°34′19″W

Information
- Other name: High School 1327
- Former name: Sir Francis Drake High School
- School type: Public, comprehensive high school
- Founded: 1951
- School district: Tamalpais Union High School District
- Oversight: Western Association of Schools and Colleges, Accrediting Commission for School
- Superintendent: Tara Taupier
- School number: CEEB Code: 052770
- Principal: Jacob Gran
- Teaching staff: 63.78 (FTE)
- Grades: 9-12
- Enrollment: 1,181 (2023–2024)
- Student to teacher ratio: 18.52
- Language: English
- Campus: Suburban
- Area: Upper Ross Valley and San Geronimo Valley, Marin County
- Colors: Green and White and Black
- Mascot: Peregrine Falcon
- Team name: Falcons
- Communities served: Fairfax, Forest Knolls, Lagunitas, Nicasio, San Anselmo, San Geronimo, and Woodacre
- Feeder schools: Lagunitas School District; Nicasio School District; Ross Valley School District
- Website: Official website

Archie Williams High School is a public secondary school located in San Anselmo, California. It is named after a former math and computing teacher Archie Williams, who was also a gold medalist in the 1936 Summer Olympics, a flight instructor with the Tuskegee Airmen, and one of the first African-American meteorologists. The school was originally named Sir Francis Drake High School, after Francis Drake. However, it changed its name in 2021, after the George Floyd protests spurred a worldwide reexamination of place names and monuments connected to racism.

The school was established in 1951 as the second high school in the Tamalpais Union High School District. It is located at 1327 Sir Francis Drake Boulevard, situated on a 21-acre (85,000 m^{2}) campus bordered by two creeks. The site was formerly known as Cordone Gardens.

The graduation rate in 2015 was approximately 99%.

== History ==
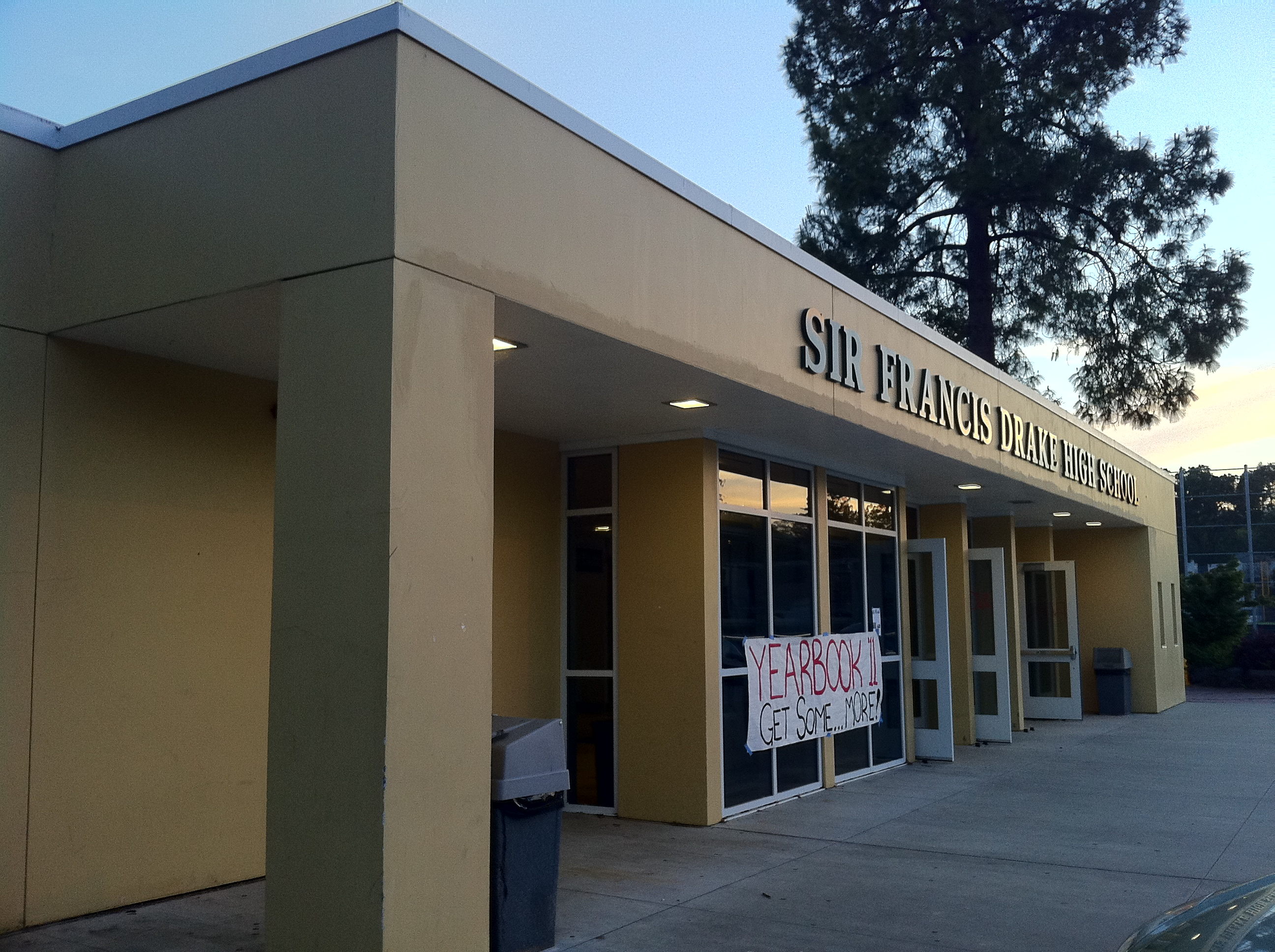
The school in 2011 with its former name

Archie Williams High School was founded as Sir Francis Drake High School (aka Drake High School) in 1951 to serve students in grades 9–12 from Corte Madera, Larkspur, Kentfield, Greenbrae, Ross, San Anselmo, Fairfax, Woodacre, Lagunitas, Forest Knolls, San Geronimo, and Nicasio. This was the second high school to be introduced into the Tamalpais Union High School District, the first being Tamalpais High School. In 1958, Redwood High School opened to accommodate students from Corte Madera, Larkspur, Kentfield, Ross, and Greenbrae.

From 1971 until 1984, Drake High School operated a separate "School Within A School" (SWAS) within the pre-1950 Devonshire Hall, for students who wanted to explore alternative community-building, interactive, and experiential pedagogy. SWAS was a pioneer in developing such an alternative school within a public school system.

Between 1992 and 1995, Drake High School started a new program of small learning communities due to the poor performance of students, which was affecting the perception of the school. Drake has received two state grants for these programs; one in 1996–1997 and the other being in 2000. There are now six Freshman-Sophomore Small Learning Communities (English and Social Studies pairings) and two Junior-Senior Academies (Team and SEA-DISC) after the closure of COMACAD.

During the protests against police brutality and racism that followed the murder of George Floyd, school officials initiated a process to consider changing the name of Sir Francis Drake High School, citing "the racist and violent acts of Francis Drake, a slave trader, slave owner, and colonizer, and the legacy of white supremacy he represents," and noting that "honoring such a person is counter to the values held by our community and counter to the lessons and values we wish our students and colleagues to learn." During the renaming process, the school adopted the temporary name "High School 1327", a reference to its address. On May 6, 2021, an elected school committee composed of students, parents and staff voted to rename the school after former teacher and Olympic athlete Archie Williams. The Tamalpais United School District Board of Trustees unanimously approved the new name five days later.

== School awards ==
In 1990, Archie Williams High School was designated as a Next Century School by RJR Nabisco Foundation for its "entrepreneurship in education." It was one of 30 schools to receive this award.

In 1999, Archie Williams High School was designated as a California Distinguished School.

In 2003, Archie Williams was the first high school to be recognized has a Bay Area Green Business School for its environmental awareness around campus.

== Extracurricular activities ==
=== Basketball ===
In 1982, both the boys' and girls' basketball teams took the state division II title. The boys' team returned to the states championship in 2014 but lost.

=== The Pitch ===
The school newspaper, originally named the Jolly Roger, is published almost every month. The 1986-87 edition was a winner of Columbia University’s Silver Crown Award for high school newspapers in 1988. The Jolly Roger has been a regular recipient of the Medalist rating, given to the top 5% among high school newspapers in its class in the United States.

Following the school's name change in 2021, the newspaper also changed its name from Jolly Roger to The Pitch.

=== Mountain biking club ===
The school's NICA NorCal League mountain bike team is notable for being one of the first in the nation and has won numerous regional and statewide competitions. The team is 11-time NorCal League champions (2004, 2006, 2009–2017) and eight-time California State champions (2009–2012, 2015–2018).

== Notable alumni ==
- Lance Acord, ('82) cinematographer
- Lee Altenberg, ('75) theoretical biologist
- Arj Barker, comedian
- Alex Bennett, radio broadcaster for Sirius XM Left
- Joel Blum, Broadway actor and dancer, nominated for two Tony Awards
- Terry Bozzio, musician (Frank Zappa, Missing Persons, U.K.)
- Scott Capurro, actor, comedian, author
- Reggie Carolan, professional football player
- Konrad Dryden, author
- David Fierro, TV and film actor
- Linda Gregg, ('61), poet
- Erinn Hayes, actress known for Children's Hospital
- Tessa Hulls, 2025 Pulitzer Prize winning graphic novelist and polymath
- Steve Lavin, college basketball head coach and ESPN broadcaster
- Jane Levy, ('07) actress from ABC comedy Suburgatory and NBC comedy Zoey's Extraordinary Playlist
- Edward Neumeier, ('75) screenwriter of RoboCop and Starship Troopers
- Alex Pribble, college basketball coach
- Michael Rossmann, FSM activist and teacher
- Joe Ryan, pitcher for the Minnesota Twins
- Fiona O'Sullivan, professional soccer player
- Jim Saia, college basketball head coach
- Kirk R. Smith, ('63) climatologist, Nobel Prize recipient
- Scott Thunes, ('76) musician
- Margaret Torn, ('78) carbon geochemist at Lawrence Berkeley Laboratory
- Alex Zettl, ('74) physicist at Lawrence Berkeley Laboratory

== Notable faculty ==
- Archie Williams (May 1, 1915 – June 24, 1993), Math & Computers Teacher and Track Coach, 1936 Berlin Olympics 400-meter gold medalist, Fighter Pilot and Trainer in World War II
- Clarke Bugbee, AP Enviornmental Science and Biology Teacher, SEADISC program leader, United States Navy Veteran
