= San Geronimo Creek =

River in California, United States

San Geronimo Creek Arroyo De San Geronimo Arroyo Nicasio
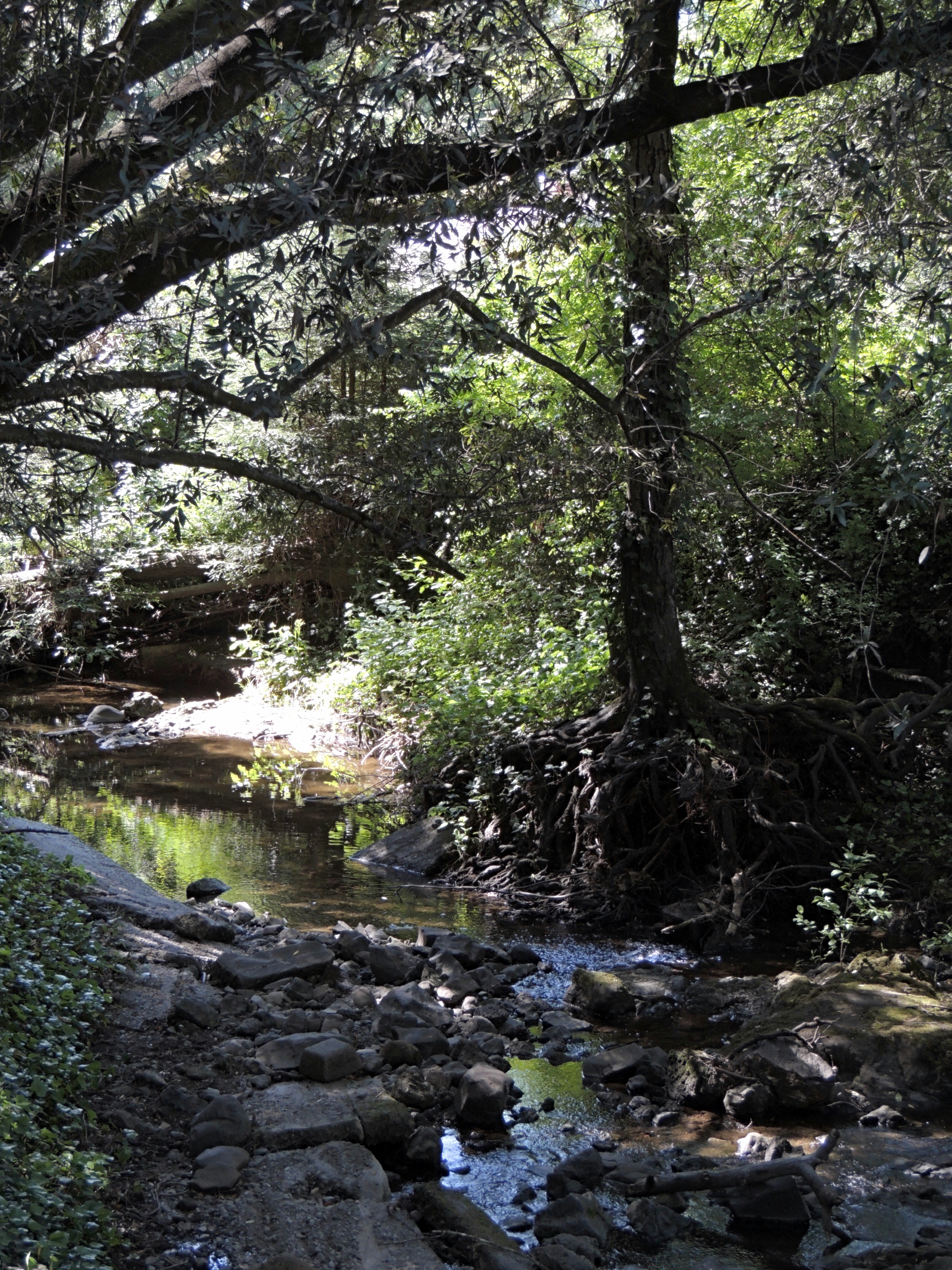
- San Geronimo Creek, Marin County, California. View is looking downstream (westward) from the Creamery Road bridge in San Geronimo.
- Etymology: Spanish language

Location
- Country: United States
- State: California
- Region: Marin County
- District: West Marin
- Cities: Forest Knolls, Lagunitas, San Geronimo, Woodacre

Physical characteristics
- Source: California Coast Ranges
  - location: 3 mi (5 km) west of Lucas Valley
  - coordinates: 37°59′42″N 122°38′22″W
- Mouth: Lagunitas Creek; The Inkwells
  - coordinates: 38°0′17″N 122°42′32″W
  - elevation: 161 ft (49 m)
- Discharge
  - location: inkwells

San Geronimo Creek is a stream in Marin County, California, United States, which feeds into Lagunitas Creek below Kent Lake.

== Course ==
The creek rises in the hills west of the town of Fairfax. It descends northward to Woodacre, where it turns westward and parallels Sir Francis Drake Boulevard through the villages of San Geronimo, Forest Knolls, and Lagunitas. It then turns southwestward and joins Lagunitas Creek at the eastern edge of the Samuel P. Taylor State Park.

== Ecology ==
The 6000 acre San Geronimo Creek watershed is within the 60,000 acre Lagunitas Creek Watershed, which is home to the largest-remaining wild run of coho salmon in central California. These coho are part of the "Central California Coast Evolutionarily Significant Unit," or CCC ESU, and are listed as "endangered" at both the state and federal level.

Efforts are also being made to protect and restore streams and habitat in the San Geronimo Valley, where upwards of 20% of the Lagunitas salmon spawn each year and where as much as 1/5 of the juvenile salmon (or fry) spend their entire freshwater lives.

Spawning salmon and trout may be viewed at Roy's Pools, located about 5 miles (8.0 km) west of Fairfax. There are jump pools and a fish ladder. They may also be viewed at the Leo T. Cronin Fish Viewing Area, located in Lagunitas along Sir Francis Drake Boulevard.

== Bridges ==
At least seven bridges span San Geronimo Creek:

- at Meadow Way, 0.5 miles (0.80 km) south of Sir Francis Drake Boulevard, a concrete continuous slab 70 feet (21 m) long, built in 1965.
- at Lagunitas Road, 0.03 miles (0.048 km) south of Sir Francis Drake Boulevard, a prestressed concrete tee beam 67 feet (20 m) long, built in 1964.
- Mountain View Road at Sir Francis Drake Boulevard, a steel bridge 51 feet (16 m) long, built in 1962 and reconstructed in 1974.
- at Montezuma Road 0.03 miles (0.048 km) south of Sir Francis Drake Boulevard, a concrete culvert 33 feet (10 m) long, built in 1938.
- at Sir Francis Drake Boulevard 7.6 miles (12.2 km) east of State Route 1, a concrete tee beam 32 feet (9.8 m) long, built in 1929 and reconstructed in 1993.
- at Creamery Road, 0.04 miles (0.064 km) south of Sir Francis Drake Boulevard, a concrete Tee Beam 23 feet (7.0 m) long, built in 1948.
- at San Geronimo Valley Drive, 0.04 miles (0.064 km) east of Nicasio Valley Road, a concrete tee beam 22 feet (6.7 m) long, built in 1929.

== See also ==
- List of watercourses in the San Francisco Bay Area
