= PLANS (non-profit) =

California educational advocacy organization

People for Legal and Non-Sectarian Schools (PLANS) is an organization based in California in the United States which campaigns against the public funding of Waldorf methods charter schools alleging they violate the United States Constitution's separation of church and state. The group claims independent Waldorf schools and public Waldorf methods charter schools teach anthroposophical content, that this content is religious in nature, and that the schools disguise the anthroposophical content from the public. PLANS filed federal suit in 1998 against two California public school districts, Sacramento City Unified School District and Twin Ridges Elementary School District, to halt the Waldorf methods educational programs implemented in two of their schools. The case was ultimately dismissed on its merits in 2012.

The group was founded in 1995 and became a California non-profit corporation in 1997. Its founding officers, president Debra Snell and secretary Dan Dugan are former Waldorf school parents. The organization numbered less than 50 members when the lawsuit was brought.

== Mission statement ==
The group describes its mission as to

1. "Provide parents, teachers, and school boards with views of Waldorf education from outside the cult of Rudolf Steiner."
2. "Expose the illegality of public funding for Waldorf school programs in the US."
3. "Litigate against schools violating the Establishment Clause of the First Amendment in the US."

== PLANS lawsuit ==
In February 1998, PLANS filed suit against two California public school districts, Sacramento City Unified School District and Twin Ridges Elementary School District, operating Waldorf-methods schools; one operating a Waldorf-based charter school and the other operating a Waldorf-based magnet school. In the complaint, PLANS argued that it was "informed and believes that a primary purpose and primary effect of said operation of Waldorf schools is to advance religion, including the religious doctrines of Anthroposophy", and as such were acting in violation of the First and Fourteenth Amendments of the United States Constitution and Article IX of the California Constitution.

In response to PLANS' 1999 Motion for Summary Judgement, the Court ruled against their contention that the primary purpose of the program in those schools was to advance religion, finding that the two school districts targeted have a secular, non-religious purpose for implementing Waldorf teaching methods in their schools, but allowed the case to proceed on the second question, whether a primary effect of the programs may be the unintended consequence of endorsing any religion to an extent that violates the Constitution.

=== Case dismissed on its merits ===
The trial was scheduled on September 12, 2005, and was expected to run for 16 days. The presiding judge determined two issues to be decided in the trial. The first issue was to determine if anthroposophy is a religion for Establishment Clause purposes - the defendants contended it was not. The second issue, which required first an affirmative ruling that anthroposophy is a religion for Establishment Clause purposes, would decide whether the public schools in those two districts were promoting anthroposophy to an extent that violated the U.S. Constitution.

The trial convened as scheduled, but ended in 30 minutes after PLANS failed in their legal burden to present an offer of proof (proffer) of evidence sufficient to prove anthroposophy was a religion. PLANS' attorney told the court PLANS could not meet its burden, and that as a result of earlier evidentiary rulings before the court, it could furnish no witnesses at trial to testify anthroposophy was a religion. PLANS did attempt to introduce one piece of documentary evidence on the religion issue. Arguments were heard, but no evidence was presented during the trial. The court ruled that PLANS failed its evidentiary burden of proof, and ordered the case be dismissed on the merits.

=== Decision is appealed ===
PLANS filed a notice of appeal of the decision in November, 2005. The appeal claims that the earlier rulings preventing PLANS from calling two defense expert witnesses for their own case-in-chief left them no witnesses able to give evidence that anthroposophy was a religion. The earlier rulings resulted from pretrial motions submitted six months prior to trial. The two witnesses PLANS wished to call were first disclosed by the defendants as witnesses against PLANS in the case. PLANS argues in the appeal that an automatic disclosure rule cited by the judge, though in effect at the time of trial in 2005, was not in effect in 1998 when the case was filed, and claims the witnesses were fully disclosed under the applicable rules.

=== Case again dismissed on its merits ===
In November 2010, the judge in the case dismissed it on its merits a second time. With the exception of one item, the Bylaws of the Anthroposophical Society, all of the plaintiff's evidence was either withdrawn before trial or excluded at trial as inadmissible hearsay. The plaintiff called one percipient witness, not friendly to their cause, and no expert witnesses. In his ruling, the judge cited the plaintiff's attempts to elicit from a percipient witness testimony only allowable from an expert witness, and their "complete failure to present percipient testimony relevant to the essential issues in the case" as already sufficient basis for an adverse judgment. He added, however, that aside from the plaintiff's effective failure to present a viable case, "the evidence suggests that anthroposophy is a method of learning which is available to anyone regardless of their religious or philosophical persuasion. Stated another way, anthroposophy is more akin to a methodology or approach to learning as opposed to a religious doctrine or organized set of beliefs." The judge concluded by giving a detailed analysis on the basis of a number of determining factors why anthroposophy should not be judged a religion for Establishment Clause purposes.

=== Case history ===
After its first ruling in 1999, the U.S. District Court—Eastern District of California has issued key rulings on the case in 2001, 2004 and 2005:

- In 2001, the Court dismissed the case. A legal precedent set earlier in a similar case in New York, though not related to Waldorf education, led the Court to find that PLANS lacked grounds to claim taxpayer standing in the case. After an appeal by PLANS, the US 9th Circuit Appellate Court in February 2003 reversed the decision on taxpayer standing by the lower court, allowing the case to proceed towards trial.
- In May 2004, PLANS filed a motion for summary judgment, or, in the alternative, summary adjudication, requesting that the Court rule that anthroposophy is a religion, based on material presented by PLANS. But the Court did not accept these arguments, and on 15 November 2004 denied the motion, stating that "triable issues of material fact exist as to whether Anthroposophy is a religion". The Court also provided a new opportunity for both sides to declare witnesses and evidence, with a deadline of January 2005 for disclosure of these.
- In April 2005, the Court issued an order outlining the trial issues and the evidentiary and procedural guidelines for the trial, scheduled for September 12, 2005. The court separated the issues, stating that it would be first necessary to try the question of whether anthroposophy was a religion, and secondly, whether anthroposophy was present in the schools. The order denied PLANS eleven witnesses, for failure by its attorney to make timely disclosure to Defendants, and 105 of PLANS' exhibits, as a result of discovery sanctions.
- In June, 2009, PLANS' lawyer for the case tendered his "resignation with disciplinary charges pending" from the California Bar; previous disciplinary charges in 2007 and 2008 had cited willful violations of the professional code.
- In August, 2010 the second trial is set to begin in federal court in Sacramento.
- In November, 2010 the ruling on the second trial was published, with a finding against the plaintiff (PLANS) and for the defendants. An appeal was planned with the support of the Pacific Justice Institute.
- In 2012, PLANS' appeal was heard by the U.S. Court of Appeals for the 9th Circuit. The Court affirmed the 2010 ruling and the case was dismissed on its merits.

A 2012 paper in legal science reports this verdict as being provisional, and disagrees with its result, i.e. anthroposophy was declared "not a religion" due to an outdated legal framework. Another author disagrees with the point of that paper. Yet another author agrees with the point of that paper. As early as 1959, the International Bureau of Education had stated that anthroposophy is a religion.

== History of the public activity of the group ==
PLANS secretary Dan Dugan delivered prepared presentations to various organizations and PLANS distributed packets of prepared print materials to school boards which were at the time considering adopting Waldorf methods in their districts. Dugan also established a webpage for the organization and moderated a public email discussion list, devoted to topics on the Waldorf curriculum, anthroposophy, and to discussion related to the Waldorf schools.

In February 1996, Dugan delivered a slide presentation to the school board in Twin Ridges Elementary School District. The district had been operating a Waldorf-methods charter school for two years. In response to Dugan's presentations, a local committee formed, headed by Baptist pastor, James Morton, and members of the committee argued both in public meetings and through the local media outlets that the school's teachings were in conflict with the US constitution's provision regarding the separation of church and state. Morton soon joined PLANS and took a place on its governing board.

PLANS contacted the California Attorney General in March 1997, arguing for an investigation into Waldorf Methods public schools statewide, urging the officer to act immediately to end the funding of all such schools.

In April 1997, Dugan delivered arguments against the public funding of Waldorf methods education to a board meeting of the Yuba County Office of Education in Marysville, California. The county operated two schools for juvenile offenders which were both engaged in an experimental project to develop a nationally-replicable Waldorf-based educational model. Shortly after this meeting, PLANS set up a picket line at one of the Yuba County Waldorf-based schools. One of the school's teachers joined the PLANS campaign and became Vice-President of their governing board.

In spring 1996, PLANS made its first contact with the Sacramento Unified School District to urge district officials there to discontinue their planned Waldorf methods magnet school program. Conversion to the new program was funded in its first two years by a $491,000 federal grant, much of it used to begin training the school's faculty in the Waldorf approach. The magnet program proceeded as planned, and Waldorf methods were adopted at the beginning of the 1996/97 school year at Oak Ridge Elementary School. A parent survey conducted in the following spring indicated parents were mostly satisfied with this new teaching program. Attendance improved and none of the enrolled students applied for transfer during the district's "open enrollment" period. But 11 of the 26 teachers requested transfers from Oak Ridge School - half for personal reasons, and the rest objecting to the Waldorf teacher training or to its educational philosophy.

On April 30, 1997, PLANS officials distributed leaflets entitled, "Save Oak Ridge School From the Steiner Cult".

Parents formed a local committee called "Concerned Citizens for Oak Ridge School". In May, news media reported that controversial statements had been made by parents during an Oak Ridge meeting, accusing the school of teaching the students about witchcraft, human sacrifices, and religious altars, and charging that the children were being initiated into a cult.

Soon after, PLANS held protests in front of the school, and picketers waved flags and anti-Waldorf signs, some demanding the termination of two staff members in the school.

In a newspaper interview in May, Dugan commented on the independent Waldorf school in Davis: "They believe that there are spirits behind everything. I know there are people who would call that evil. (They) would consider anthroposophy a satanic religion." Dugan, described the educators as "misguided", not "evil".

In the summer of 1997, district officials voted unanimously to continue the Waldorf-methods magnet program, but to relocate it to another campus, John Morse Elementary. PLANS sought legal assistance and found lawyer Scott Kendall, an attorney affiliated with the Christian evangelical legal organization, the Pacific Justice Institute (PJI). The PJI applied for a grant on behalf of PLANS, seeking to raise funds from the evangelical Alliance Defense Fund (ADF) to initiate PLANS' legal suit against public school districts operating Waldorf methods schools. The PJI application alleged the Sacramento school engaged in "Wicca"-based practices, religious proselytizing and coercion, and that a third of the parents had kept their children home from school in protest. A video copy of a local televised news report about the controversy accompanied the application.

ADF awarded a $15,000 grant in February 1998, and immediately after, PLANS filed suit against Sacramento City Unified School District and Twin Ridges Elementary School District, demanding a permanent injunction against the implementation of the Waldorf-methods curriculum in the schools, as well as full reimbursement for all legal costs. PLANS entered into a signed agreement with the Concerned Citizens for Oak Ridge School, promising the organization that in exchange for their efforts assisting PLANS in the lawsuit, PLANS would share one-fifth of any proceeds awarded in the event of a favorable judgement and "cost multiplier" fines imposed.

In December 2000 PLANS hired a private detective to attend a voluntary Winter's Solstice celebration for kindergarten through third-graders that took place in the evening in a privately rented meeting hall. The detective videotaped the ceremony. PLANS played the tape in a presentation to a school board in Chico, California, as evidence that Waldorf teaching methods are religious.

In ongoing challenges against the Waldorf methods public schools in other districts, PLANS pointedly referenced their pending lawsuit, warning that other districts too would face expensive legal challenges if they allowed Waldorf based methods in any of their schools. PLANS' challenges against Waldorf methods charter schools in the Chico Unified and Ross Valley school districts resulted in the denial of pending charter school proposals there. However, the proponents of those charters soon reapplied in alternative districts nearby and both charters were accepted: the Blue Oaks Charter School, opened September 2001 under Chico's Butte County Office of Education, and the Waldorf-Inspired School of Lagunitas, opened September 2004 in the Lagunitas School District. Sacramento Unified, Twin Ridges Elementary, and Yuba County districts also continue to operate their Waldorf methods programs. Today, there are 19 public schools in California that have adopted the Waldorf methods.

== Criticism of PLANS ==
The Oak Ridge School in Sacramento became the target of threats and accusations that its teachers led children through witchcraft and sorcery practices in the classroom. While neither of these accusations could be attributed to PLANS, school officials accused PLANS of playing to public prejudices and paranoia, and arousing anxieties in the community by presenting a distorted view of their teachings to the parents of the school, most of whom weren't English proficient. Local picketers who joined the PLANS protest against Oak Ridge credited the PLANS leaflets as the initial source of their concerns, and the town's newspaper concurred, pointing to data from the school which indicated that since introducing Waldorf methods there had been positive impacts on absenteeism, voluntary re-enrollment, as well as overall parent satisfaction as measured shortly before PLANS' appearance at the school. The paper's editor accused PLANS of alarming parents with claims for which there was no evidence, including the suggestion that Waldorf methods were disguised witchcraft teachings.

Public school officials in California's Marysville, Twin Ridges, Novato and Butte schools criticized PLANS as well; a principal in the Yuba County District, which was the target of PLANS' protests over their two Waldorf methods schools, expressed outrage over "the lies, the distortion of facts" when questioned by a reporter. In reference to the PLANS lawsuit, the Nevada County superintendent of schools characterized it as "despicable" to have to redirect moneys from teachers and curriculum to pay legal costs, and insisted there was no merit to PLANS' accusations. The accuracy and expertise of PLANS officials also came under attack during lawsuit witness hearings. Six of the PLANS board directors and advisors sought to testify as expert witnesses in the case, but each was eliminated due to their lack of expertise on the subjects of anthroposophy and Waldorf education: three were eliminated by the court judge, and the other three subsequently withdrawn voluntarily by PLANS' attorney, Kendall. After reviewing key sections of the deposition testimony taken of PLANS' most vocal spokesperson, Dugan, the judge expressed "grave doubts about any reliance upon his opinions about anything that has to do with any intellectual endeavor, including anthroposophy" before ruling that Dugan would not be allowed to give testimony in the trial.

When PLANS succeeded in convincing board members in Ross Valley and Chico school districts to vote against proposed Waldorf methods charters there, both proposals were welcomed by other school districts nearby, allowing the new schools to go forward., Local news commentators in one of the targeted communities castigated their local school district for caving to PLANS' threat of a lawsuit, and showcased the episode as one of the most notably "boneheaded or downright wrong things" of the past year.

The Anthroposophical Society in America (ASA), which is the legal representative of anthroposophy in the United States, has challenged PLANS over PLANS' characterizations of anthroposophy, as well as PLANS' suggestion that the anthroposophical movement has a direct interest or involvement in the growth of Waldorf teaching methods in the public schools. These were two claims PLANS made in its May 28, 2004, "Motion for Summary Judgement". Though not a direct party to the case, the ASA petitioned the court's permission to respond to this trial motion as a friend of the court. The court granted ASA's petition and, in July 2004, the organization submitted an 18-page legal brief to the court challenging PLANS' assertions.

== Argumentation by Waldorf methods charter schools and PLANS ==
Advocates of public Waldorf education claim that Waldorf methods (charter) schools should be able to receive public funding. PLANS claims that although Waldorf representatives often state that a public "Waldorf methods" program has been structured so as not to violate the U.S. Constitution, these schools nevertheless have religious underpinnings. Private Waldorf schools celebrate religious festivals and observe religious holidays, for instance. PLANS asserts that in public Waldorf methods schools these activities are not always avoided and are sometimes simply renamed. PLANS alleges that morning verses recited in the public school in which children thank the sun for its warmth are actually prayers, and claim that the sun is a metaphor Steiner used to refer to Christ. In public Waldorf methods schools in the U.S., "God" has been removed from the verse and replaced with "the Sun" to avoid violation of the U.S. Constitution. PLANS claims this is a cosmetic and not a substantive change.

PLANS also claims that not only private, but also public, Waldorf methods schools are anthroposophical institutions. According to PLANS, public Waldorf teachers are required in most cases to take Waldorf teacher training in which they are asked to read works almost exclusively by Rudolf Steiner, the founder of Waldorf education, the focus of which are Steiner's tenets of anthroposophy.

The two Waldorf methods public schools PLANS brought to court presented numerous witnesses and introduced documents which contradicted this claim. The judge ruled that PLANS could not introduce evidence taken in the context of the private and independent Waldorf schools to argue their case against the public Waldorf-methods schools. The court ruled that private schools are separate entities, and insisted evidence be limited to policies and practices in effect within the litigated public school districts. The two schools furnished statements and documents in this case showing that the teachers in their Waldorf methods schools were held to the same state mandated training and credential requirements as the teachers in other public schools in those districts. In response to a demand to prepare a complete list of all Waldorf-related documents and reading materials related to training or instruction in Waldorf teaching methods, neither school district identified a single text written by Rudolf Steiner. Betty Staley, the Rudolf Steiner College staff member who developed the public teacher training program, testified the college's 1993-1994 Teacher Training Booklists did not apply to the public teacher training program, and that only one of the texts from the lists, Steiner's Philosophy of Freedom, was used by the program.

In their trial case, PLANS did not repeat their claim that these or other texts by Steiner were required in the public Waldorf-methods teacher training. However, they did claim that the schools "provide[d] books for its teachers that are filled with Anthroposophical doctrine", and that teachers were "hire[d] because of their Anthroposophical training." According to Staley's testimony, references to spirituality were eliminated from the public Waldorf teachers’ training materials to meet state standards. One teacher who had participated in this program before adopting Waldorf methods in her teaching in the Oak Ridge, and later John Morse schools, reported that Steiner’s philosophy was alluded to in her training and that teachers who wanted to learn more could pay for their own classes, but that most of her colleagues from Morse did not pursue any anthroposophical training in the course of becoming public Waldorf methods teachers.

PLANS claims the basis of anthroposophy is esoteric Christianity. In court documents, PLANS argued that Rudolf Steiner considered himself a Christian and that he considered anthroposophy to be a Christian form of theosophy and Rosicrucianism. PLANS argued that Steiner himself described anthroposophy as a training to access skills of psychic awareness latent in each human being, and argued that the discipline "spiritual science" is not a true science nor philosophy, but a theology. PLANS acknowledged that Steiner's supporters frequently concede the spiritual foundations of anthroposophy and Waldorf education, but claimed they make a false distinction between spiritual and religious. PLANS considered anthroposophy to be part of a New Age religious movement, characterized by its seekers' rejection of orthodoxy and creedal forms of religious expression in favor of a more eclectic and individualized path of spiritual-psychological transformation, a process which PLANS claimed to be generally acknowledged as "religious experience".

PLANS wanted the court to agree that Waldorf methods schools lead students through New Age rituals and interpret them as religious practices. It also wanted the court to agree that in the schools, anthroposophy permeates every subject, and that the underlying theory of the education is based on theology, not philosophy. In order to do this, PLANS first needed to convince the court that anthroposophy was a religion. This attempt was unsuccessful, and PLANS seeks to reverse the decision in appeals court.

== Waldorf educators and public Waldorf methods education ==
Some supporters of Waldorf education have suggested that Waldorf education does not belong in government schools. Eugene Schwartz is a prominent teacher and author who has stated that he agreed with Dugan that Waldorf education could not properly be separated from anthroposophy. In Schwartz's view, although Waldorf education is not sectarian, the children are intended to have inwardly religious experiences. In his speech he exemplified this with the way the origin and history of the Jews is taught in grade three in independent Waldorf schools. Schwartz was fired from his position at a teaching college shortly after the speech, and in a later interview, claimed there were many other Waldorf teachers who agreed with him but were afraid to speak out. In Schwartz's opinion, Waldorf education has the goal of making "everything sacramental", and that "willing, feeling, and thinking" are "soul forces" which are intentionally brought to every aspect of the education. Schwartz objected to educators who would reject the movement's religious aspect to suit the requirements of public education. In the interview, Schwartz lamented the fact that, in his view, public Waldorf methods schools are watered-down imitations of authentic Waldorf education.

Schwartz has since become an active promoter of Waldorf education in charter and public schools.
