= Bothin Tunnel =

Tunnel in California

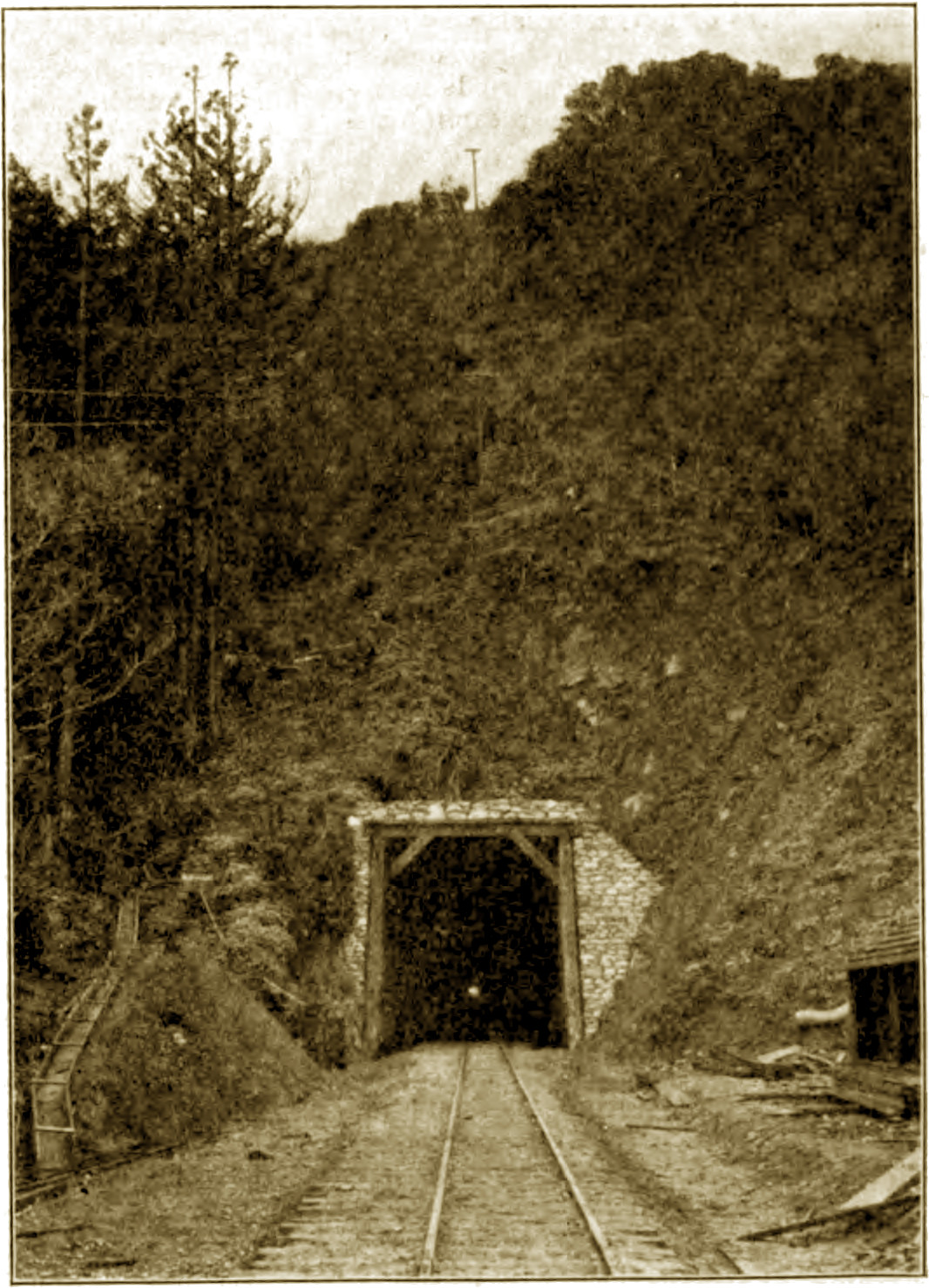
- East portal of the tunnel

Overview
- Other name: White's Hill Tunnel
- Location: Marin County, California
- System: North Pacific Coast Railroad
- Crosses: White's Hill
- Start: Woodacre, California (west); 38.0062°N 122.6330°W
- End: Fairfax, California (east); 38.0047°N 122.6219°W

Operation
- Constructed: 1904
- Closed: 1956
- Traffic: Railway
- Character: Passenger and freight

Technical
- Length: 3,190 feet (970 m)
- No. of tracks: 1

Bothin Tunnel is a disused 3,190 ft (970 m) long rail tunnel running connecting Fairfax, California and San Geronimo, California. The tunnel was built to replace the steep railroad grade crossing White's Hill.

== History ==
=== Operation ===
The original route between Fairfax and San Geronimo was built by the North Pacific Coast Railroad in 1874, and opened in 1875. It went over White's Hill, and required 2 tunnels and 6 trestles. In December 1904, following acquisition by the North Shore Railroad, the tunnel was built to bypass the original route, which occasionally caused trains to stall. The new route required the construction of two new trestles as well. Despite being on a narrow-gauge line, the tunnel was sized for standard-gauge railroad cars. In 1920, a large portion of the line, including the tunnel, was modified to standard-gauge. It was retimbered 5 years later.

=== Repurposing and closure ===
By the 1930s, the railroad was in a state of decline. The narrow-gauge route north of Point Reyes was dismantled in 1930, and on July 31, 1933, the final train passed through Bothin Tunnel.

Following its abandonment by the North Shore Railroad, the tracks were ripped up and it was converted into an automobile right of way. It remained in use for engines from the Marin County Fire Department, which at the time was headquartered in Woodacre. In 1940, the tunnel was opened to public traffic for 6 months when a rockslide damaged Sir Francis Drake Blvd, a road built on the former railroad route over White's Hill. The tunnel was finally sealed in 1956, following a cave-in on its western end.
