= Ross Valley School District =

School district in California

Ross Valley Elementary School District

Address
- 100 Shaw Drive San Anselmo, Marin, California, 94960; United States

District information
- Type: Public TK-8 School District
- Motto: CLIMB: Collaborate, Learn, Inspire, Mentor and Believe
- Grades: TK–8
- Superintendent: Marci Trahan
- Asst. superintendent(s): Julia Wolcott
- Business administrator: Chris Carson
- Chair of the board: Shelley Hamilton
- Schools: 5 (4 elementary, 1 middle)
- Budget: $27,728,432 (2021-22)

Students and staff
- Enrollment: 1,748 (2021-22)
- Teachers: 82.75 (FTE)
- Student–teacher ratio: 21.12

Other information
- Website: www.rossvalleyschools.org

Ross Valley School District (RVSD) is a public TK-8 school district located 13 miles north of San Francisco, on the north side of Mount Tamalpais, in Marin County, California.

The district serves students in San Anselmo and Fairfax. It also includes Sleepy Hollow and a small portion of Woodacre.

Graduates of White Hill Middle School typically attend Archie Williams High School (formerly Sir Francis Drake High School), which is part of the Tamalpais Union High School District. RVSD is within the boundaries of the Marin Community College District.

== Schools ==
The district operates four elementary schools: Brookside, Hidden Valley, Manor, and Wade Thomas; and one middle school: White Hill.
