= West Marin =

Largest rural region of Marin County, California

Coordinates: 38°0′N 122°45′W

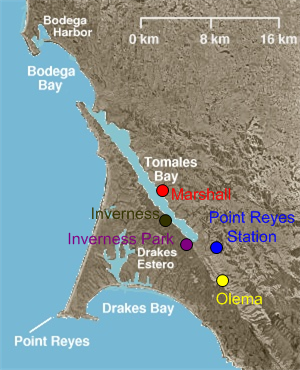
Some of the villages in rural West Marin

West Marin is the largest region of Marin County, California, which is also rural.

West Marin comprises the westernmost towns of Point Reyes Station, Olema, Stinson Beach, Bolinas, Tomales, Dillon Beach, and Inverness. West Marin is generally considered to be northwest of Muir Beach on the Pacific Ocean side of Mount Tamalpais, however it also includes Nicasio and Woodacre and going westward. When coming from Fairfax, Woodacre, which is in the San Geronimo Valley, is considered one of the local "gateways" to West Marin by many locals, cyclists and tourists alike.

The San Geronimo Valley also includes the towns of San Geronimo, Forest Knolls and Lagunitas. Local gem Samuel P Taylor Park is just west of Lagunitas.

The Point Reyes Light is a weekly newspaper covering West Marin.

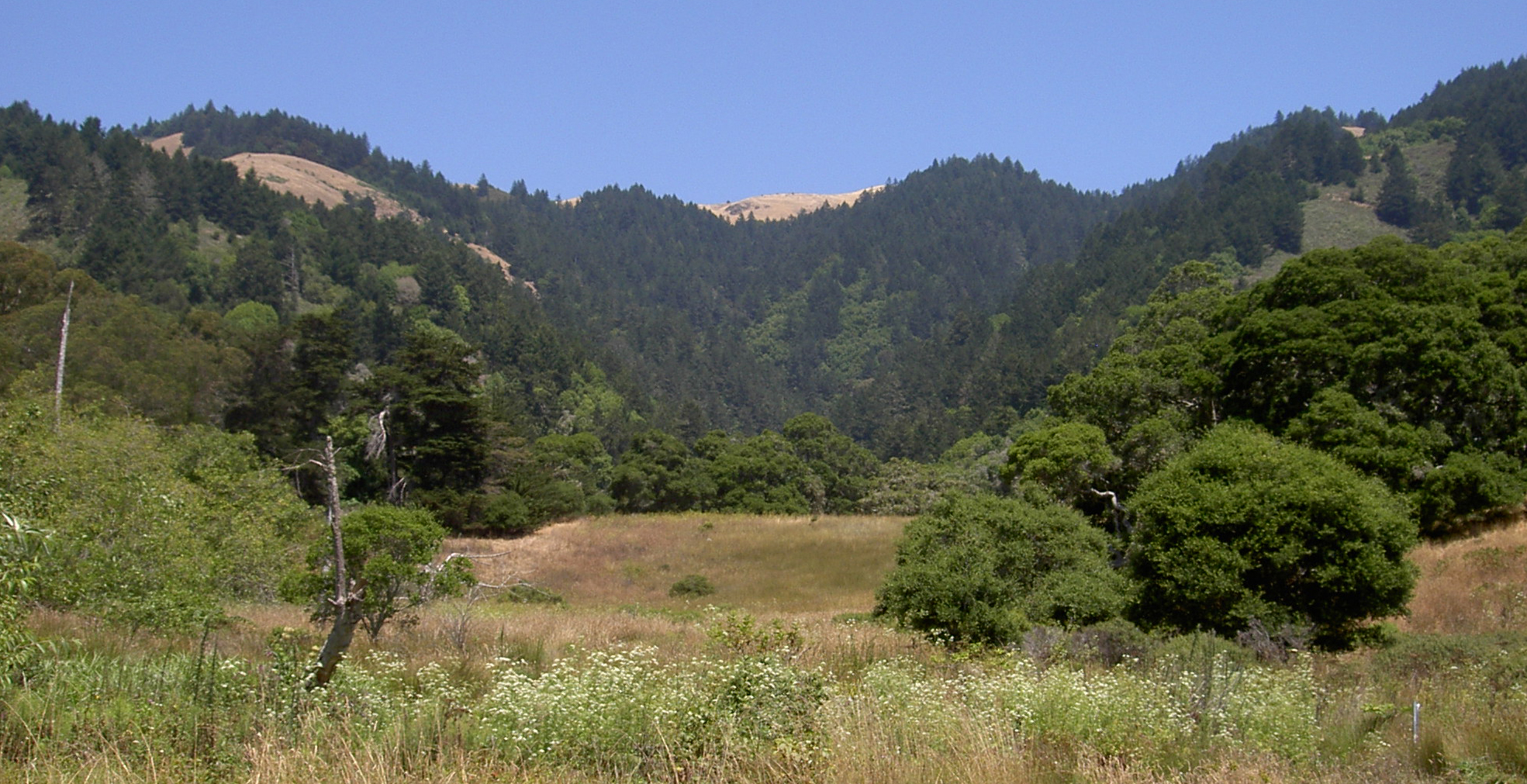
West Marin landscape

Unlike the rest of the county, which is served by Golden Gate Transit, West Marin is served only by Marin Transit, which connects to Golden Gate Transit lines at Marin City and in the San Geronimo Valley, among other locations.
