= Lagunitas School District =

School district in California, U.S.

Address
- One Lagunitas School Road San Geronimo, California, 94963; United States

District information
- Type: Public
- Grades: K–8
- Superintendent: Laura Shain
- NCES District ID: 0620520

Students and staff
- Students: 180 (2021–21)
- Teachers: 11.0 (FTE) (2021–21)
- Staff: 16.59 (FTE) (2021–21)
- Student–teacher ratio: 16.36

Other information
- Website: lagunitas.org

The Lagunitas School District is a public K–8 school district located 18 miles northwest of San Francisco in western-central Marin County, California. The district serves students in the unincorporated San Geronimo Valley.

The district includes all of Lagunitas Forest Knolls and San Geronimo, as well as almost all of Woodacre.

Graduates of the middle school usually attend Archie Williams High School (formerly Sir Francis Drake High School), which is part of the Tamalpais Union High School District. The District is within the boundaries of the Marin Community College District.

== Schools ==
The district operates two schools: Lagunitas Elementary and San Geronimo Valley Elementary. Both are located at the same address in San Geronimo, and share the same principal and superintendent.

Lagunitas Elementary includes a Montessori program serving grades K-5, which is the only public Montessori school in Marin County, and a middle school serving grades 6-8. San Geronimo Valley Elementary serves grades K-6 with its Open Classroom program.

There are currently three Open Classroom teachers, three Montessori teachers, five middle school teachers, one RSP special education teacher, and five administrative staff, as well as the principal/superintendent, Jeanelle Ferhart.
