= Tamalpais Union High School District =

School district in California

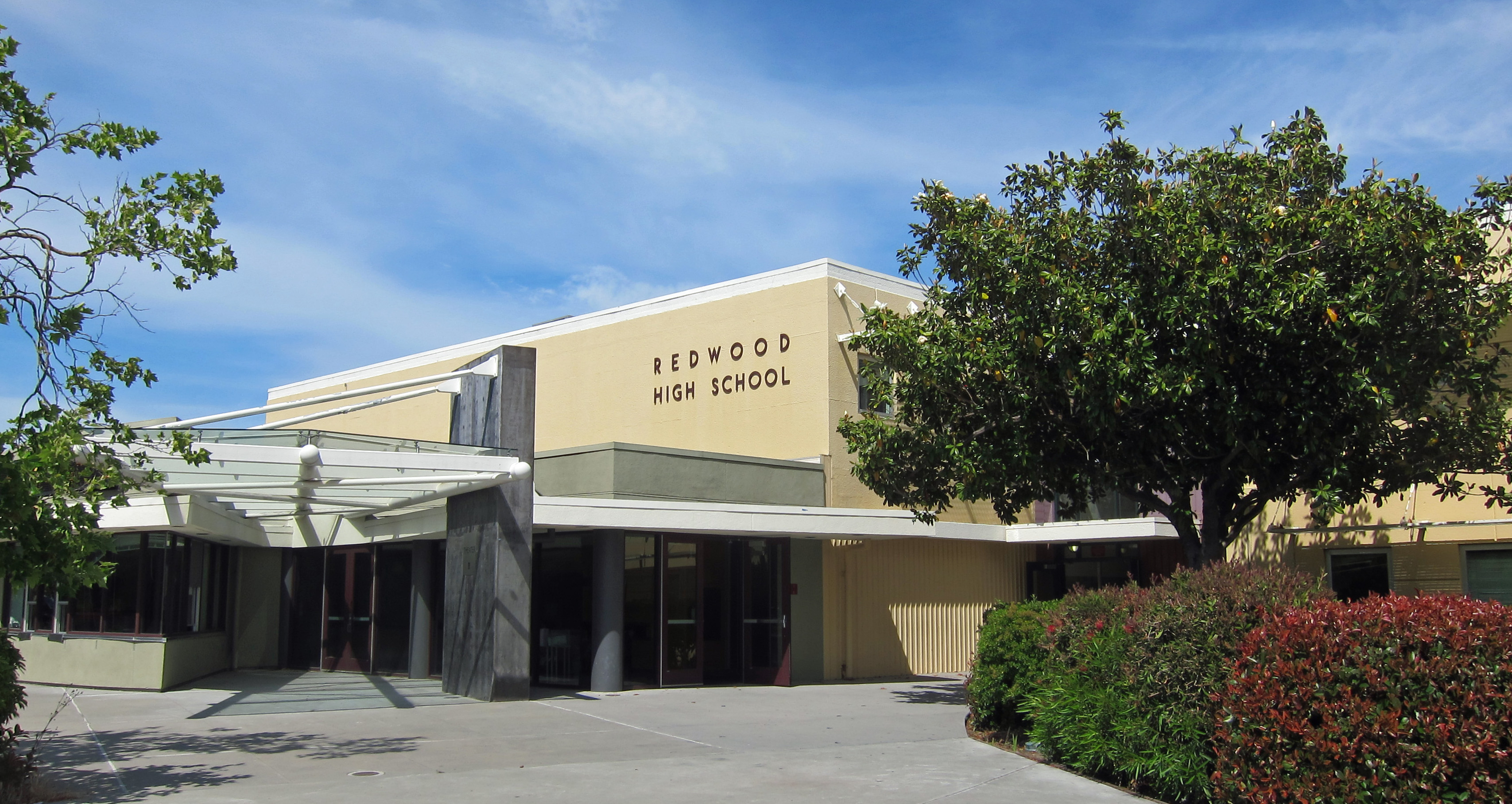
- Redwood High School, which houses the district headquarters

Address
- 395 Doherty Drive Larkspur, Marin, California, 94977; United States
- Coordinates: 37°56′15″N 122°31′24″W

District information
- Type: Public
- Grades: 9-12
- Established: 1908; 118 years ago
- Superintendent: Courtney Goode
- Asst. superintendent(s): Wesley Cedros, Corbett Elsen, Kelly Lara
- School board: Ida Green (2024-2028); Jennifer Holden (2024-2028); Cynthia Roenisch (2022-2026); Emily Ulhorn (2022-2026); Bob Walter (2003-2011)
- Accreditations: Western Association of Schools and Colleges, Accrediting Commission for Schools
- Enrollment: 4,600(2024)

Other information
- Website: www.tamdistrict.org

The Tamalpais Union High School District or TUHSD provides high school education to students residing in ten elementary districts in central and southern Marin County, California and parts of West Marin. The headquarters are on the property of Redwood High School in Larkspur, California.

== Communities served ==
Feeder school districts include: Bolinas-Stinson Union, Kentfield, Lagunitas, Larkspur-Corte Madera, Mill Valley, Nicasio, Reed Union, Ross, Ross Valley and Sausalito Marin City school districts. As of 2012, District enrollment was 3,921 students. The union high school district lies within the Marin Community College District.

Communities within the district include:

- Municipalities: Belvedere, Corte Madera, Fairfax, Mill Valley, Ross, San Anselmo, Sausalito, Tiburon, Larkspur (most of)
- Census-designated places: Bolinas, Kentfield, Lagunitas-Forest Knolls, Marin City, Muir Beach, Nicasio, San Geronimo, Sleepy Hollow, Stinson Beach, Strawberry, Tamalpais-Homestead Valley, and Woodacre

== Schools ==
The three comprehensive high schools and the communities in their attendance areas (with ZIP Codes) are:

- Tamalpais High School, Mill Valley; opened 1908; serves Bolinas (94924), Mill Valley (94941), Sausalito & Marin City (94965), Stinson Beach (94970)
- Archie Williams High School, San Anselmo; opened 1951 as Sir Francis Drake High School; serves Fairfax (94930), Forest Knolls (94933), Lagunitas (94938). Nicasio (94946), San Anselmo (94960), San Geronimo (94963), Woodacre (94973)
- Redwood High School, Larkspur; opened 1958; serves Belvedere (94920), Corte Madera (94925), Greenbrae & Kentfield (94904), Larkspur (94939), Ross (94957), Tiburon (94920)

Two alternative high schools serve the entire district:

- San Andreas High School (continuation high school), Larkspur
- Tamiscal High School (independent study), Larkspur

Tamalpais, Redwood, and Archie Williams are California Distinguished Schools. San Andreas has been recognized by the State of California as a Model Continuation School.
