= Sir Francis Drake Boulevard =

Street in Marin County, California, United States

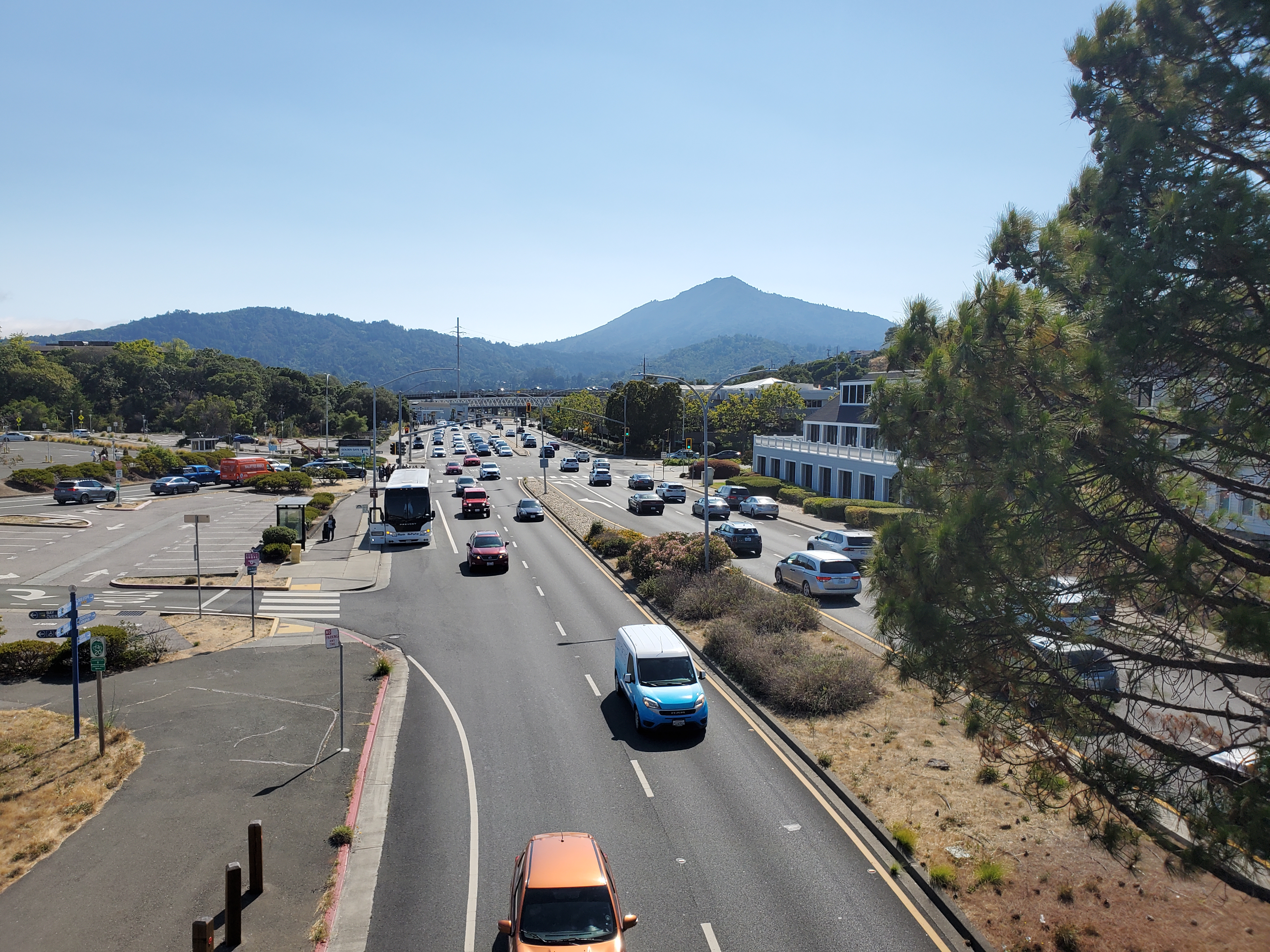
- Sir Francis Drake Boulevard in Larkspur
- Namesake: Francis Drake
- Maintained by: Marin County, California and other local jurisdictions
- West end: Near the Point Reyes Lighthouse on the Point Reyes Peninsula
- Major junctions: SR 1 north near Point Reyes Station; SR 1 south in Olema; US 101 in Larkspur
- East end: I-580 in San Rafael

Sir Francis Drake Boulevard is an approximately 43.8-mile east–west arterial road (70.5 km) in Marin County, California, running from the trailhead for Point Reyes Lighthouse at the end of the Point Reyes Peninsula to Interstate 580 just west of the Richmond-San Rafael Bridge. It is a main thoroughfare through (from west to east) the communities of Inverness, Point Reyes Station, Olema, Lagunitas-Forest Knolls, San Geronimo, Woodacre, Fairfax, San Anselmo, Ross, Kentfield, Greenbrae, and Larkspur. The road overlaps State Route 1 between Point Reyes Station and Olema.

It is named for the English privateer, explorer and world circumnavigator Francis Drake, whose ship The Golden Hind landed somewhere along the Pacific coast of North America in 1579, claiming the area for England as "Nova Albion." Drake's landing place has often been theorized to be at what is now called Drakes Bay, northeast of the western terminus for the boulevard on Point Reyes.

In the 1960s, the majority of the route of Sir Francis Drake Boulevard was to be expanded into State Route 251; however this plan was not implemented due to strong opposition by environmental groups. Facing public concern for Drake's reputed history in the slave trade, the Fairfax town council voted unanimously in early 2021 to change the road's name within the town's jurisdiction. The jurisdiction left the name intact however when they failed to reach a consensus.
