= San Anselmo, California =

City in California, United States

- Town
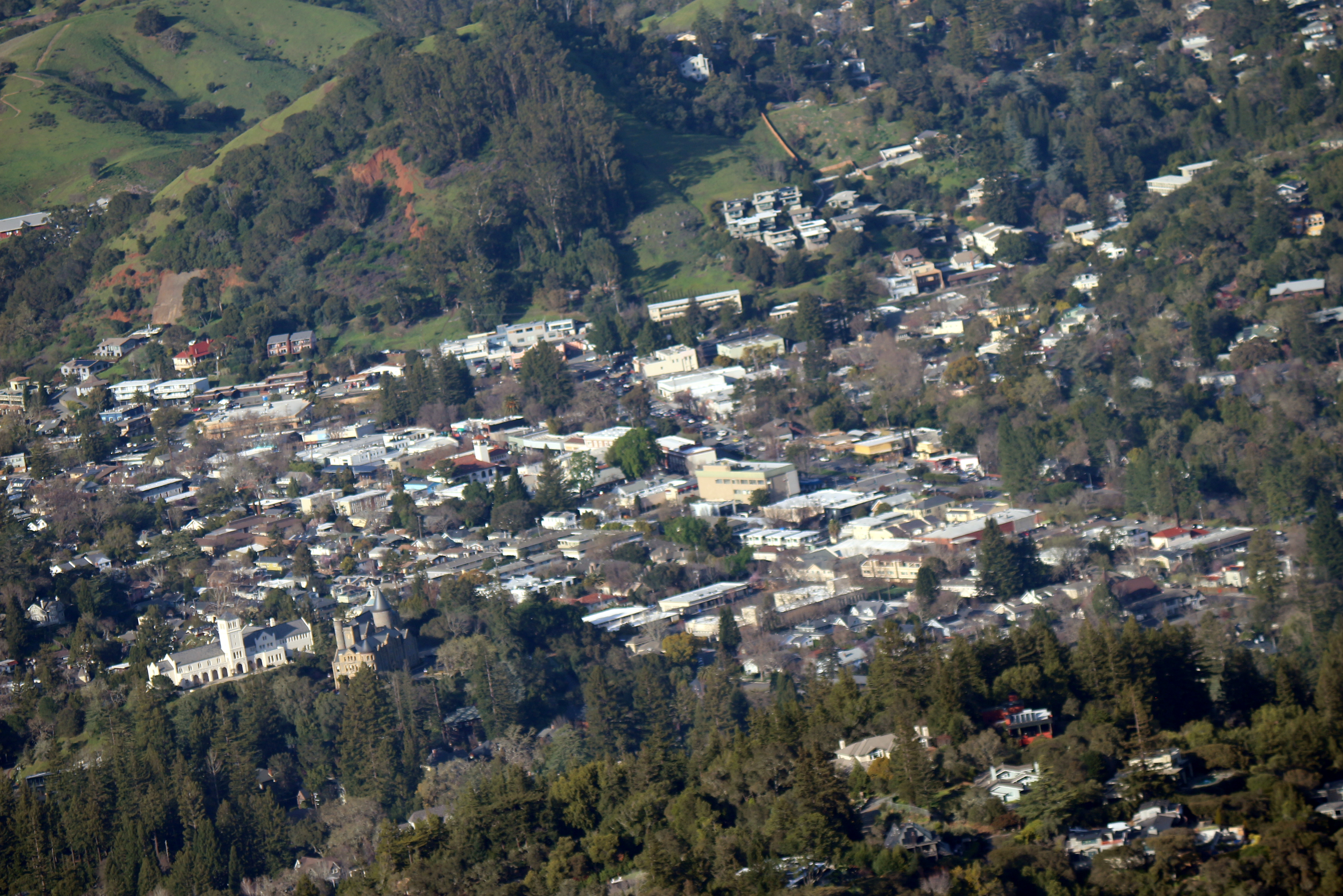
- View of San Anselmo
- Interactive map of San Anselmo, California
- Location in the United States
- Coordinates: 37°58′29″N 122°33′42″W
- Country: United States
- State: California
- County: Marin
- Incorporated: April 9, 1907

Government
  - Type: Council–manager
  - Town council: Mayor Tarrell Kullaway
  - Town manager: David P. Donery
  - Supervisor: District 2 Brian Colbert
  - Legislators: Sen. Mike McGuire (D); Asm. Damon Connolly (D); Rep. Jared Huffman (D)

Area
  - Total: 2.68 sq mi (6.93 km^{2})
  - Land: 2.68 sq mi (6.93 km^{2})
  - Water: 0 sq mi (0.00 km^{2}) 0%
- Elevation: 46 ft (14 m)

Population (2020)
  - Total: 12,830
  - Estimate (2025): 12,555
  - Density: 4,660.44/sq mi (1,799.41/km^{2})
- Time zone: UTC−08:00 (Pacific)
  - Summer (DST): UTC−07:00 (PDT)
- ZIP Codes: 94960, 94979
- Area codes: 415/628
- FIPS code: 06-64434
- GNIS feature IDs: 277591, 2413251
- Website: www.sananselmo.gov

San Anselmo (Spanish for 'Saint Anselm') is an incorporated town in Marin County, California, United States. San Anselmo is located 1.5 miles (2.4 km) west of San Rafael, at an elevation of 46 feet (14 m). It is located about 20 miles (32 km) north of San Francisco. The town is bordered by San Rafael to the east, Fairfax to the west, and Ross to the south. Mount Tamalpais dominates the view to the south. The population was 12,830 at the 2020 census.

== History ==
=== Early history ===
San Anselmo sits on Coast Miwok land which was inhabited prior to American and Spanish settlers. The land in and around San Anselmo was mostly pastoral until 1874, when the North Pacific Coast Railroad (NPC) added to its line a spur track from the newly built San Anselmo station to San Rafael. In 1875, the railroad completed a line from Sausalito to Tomales and north to Cazadero via San Anselmo. For a few years, the town was listed on railroad maps as "Junction", but in 1883 the name San Anselmo came back into use. The San Anselmo post office opened in 1892. Two postal substations were operated: Lansdale, from 1924 to 1962, and Yolanda, from 1924 to 1954.

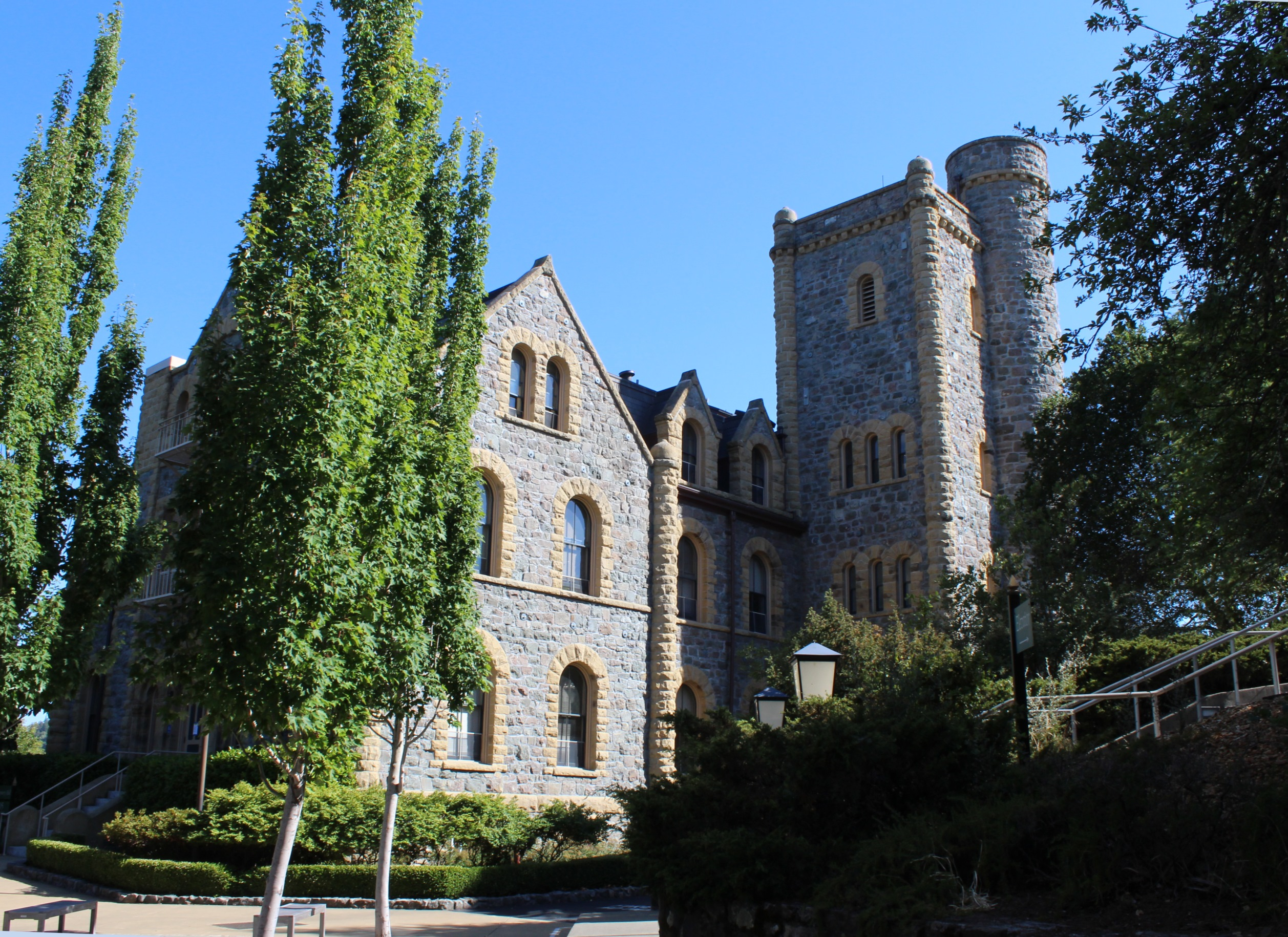
The San Francisco Theological Seminary in San Anselmo

From 1902 until the early 1940s, San Anselmo was part of Marin's Northwestern Pacific (in 1907, investors formed the NWP) Electric Train system. The Miracle Mile's and Center Boulevard's current "raised roadbed" were the railroad's right of way. Becoming unprofitable as a result of competition from the automobile and the opening of the Golden Gate Bridge, the railway was officially closed on March 1, 1941. The last of the major San Anselmo railroad station buildings was razed in 1963.

The population of San Anselmo increased after the 1906 San Francisco earthquake. Wealthy individuals displaced from San Francisco moved to their summer homes in San Anselmo, making them their permanent residences.

The 1913 electric train schedule shows a commute time from San Anselmo to the Sausalito Ferry to the Ferry Building in San Francisco of a mere 58 minutes, including the 32-minute ferry transit.

San Anselmo incorporated on April 9, 1907. Its name came from the Punta de Quintin land grant, which marked the valley as the Canada del Anselmo, or Valley of Anselm, Anselm being the name of a Native American who was buried in the area. San Anselmo was a silent film capital in the early 1900s.

=== World War II ===
==== Sleepy Hollow ammunition storage ====
During World War II, the Army based a small ammunition storage dump, known as ASP #2, about 2 miles (3.2 km) up Butterfield Road from Sir Francis Drake Blvd. The facility was located between the road and San Anselmo Creek and had 23 to 45 men stationed there. There were two batteries composed of four-inch antiaircraft cannon manned by five soldiers on a 24-hour basis. One battery was on Stuyvesant Drive and the other on Oak Springs Hill. During the war, the Sleepy Hollow Country Club, located in the old Hotaling mansion, was still open and provided a pleasant break from "grueling" guard duty, according to those stationed at the ammo dump.

==== Air raid wardens ====
During World War II, air raid wardens, like Zinnia and Alfred Heiden of San Francisco Blvd., patrolled their assigned neighborhood during nighttime air raid drills to notify neighbors of any light that shone out of their houses. Windows were covered with cloth or thick paper during the war to deny enemy bombers illuminated nighttime bombing targets.

==== Pilot training accidents ====
In the late afternoon of November 2, 1941, five weeks before the US entered the war, San Anselmo residents were startled when two low-flying Curtiss P-40 warplanes roared up the valley at just above roof level and crashed into the east side of Bald Hill (often incorrectly reported as Mount Baldy or Bald Mountain) at 5:40 pm.

Element leader Lt. Thomas "Bud" L. Truax and Lt. Russell E. Speckman were killed when their planes crashed, in low visibility, into Bald Hill, just shy of the peak. It was almost dark, was misty and they were under a low cloud ceiling. They were critically low on fuel and part of a larger training group that had gotten separated. They were under the wintertime marine layer of low clouds that are common in the Marin County area, searching for nearby Hamilton Field to land. Truax Field / Dane County Regional Airport, located in Madison, Wisconsin, was named in memory of Lt. Truax.

A third pilot, Lt. Walter V. "Ramblin" Radovich, had left the formation over San Rafael, almost hit the city courthouse on 4th Street, circled the Forbes Hill radio beacon (37°58'44.73"N,122°32'50.78"W), clipped a tree and then turned northeast, towards Hamilton Field. Unsure of what the oncoming terrain would be and critically low on fuel, he decided to climb up though the typically thin marine cloud layer to 2,500 feet (760 m), trim the airplane for straight and level flight and bail out. According to USAAF accident reports, his left leg was broken when exiting the plane and he parachuted down, landing near Highway 101 in Lucas Valley, reportedly near where Fireman's Fund / Marin Commons is currently located (38° 1'10.66"N, 122°32'29.36"W). Ironically, after Lt. Radovich bailed out, the airplane slowly descended back down through the clouds and made a relatively smooth "gear-up" landing.

=== Post-WWII ===
On March 12, 1974, San Anselmo officially became a town. In 1963, a cast iron statue of a deer affectionately known as "Sugarfoot" by locals was donated to the town by Joeseph Dondero. This statue still stands today and children enjoy riding on his back after trips to the library next door.

The town features in the song "Snow in San Anselmo" by Irish-born singer/songwriter Van Morrison, about an unusual bout of winter weather that occurred when he was living in Fairfax, near San Anselmo, in the 1970s.

San Anselmo's most prominent resident, movie director George Lucas, used some of the proceeds from his film American Graffiti to buy an old Victorian house in San Anselmo; his then-wife Marcia Lucas named it "Parkhouse." Lucas worked on his Star Wars script for two and a half years, writing much of it at the back of his San Anselmo house in a room he shared with a gaudy Wurlitzer jukebox. In 1977, Lucas screened an early version of Star Wars, without completed special effects, at his San Anselmo home for a small group of Hollywood friends, including the producer Alan Ladd Jr., directors Steven Spielberg, Brian DePalma, and Martin Scorsese, and screenwriters Jay Cocks, Willard Huyck, and Gloria Katz.

== Geography ==
The average high temperature is 85 °F (29 °C), in July, and the average low temperature is 41 °F (5 °C), in January and December. The record high was 111 °F (44 °C) in July 1972, and record low was 18 °F (−8 °C) in December 1990. Average rainfall is 47.47 inches (1,206 mm), with the rainiest month being January.

All but a sliver of San Anselmo lies within the 28-square-mile (73 km^{2}) Ross Valley Watershed that flows into San Francisco Bay. The principal waterway of the town's portion of the watershed is San Anselmo Creek, a branch of Corte Madera Creek. Two of San Anselmo Creek's tributaries, Sleepy Hollow Creek and Sorich Creek, also flow through the town, as do East Fork Creek and West Fork Creek, Sorich Creek's two tributaries.

There are three main roads running through San Anselmo. Their junction is known locally as the Hub, which lies near the central business district. Sir Francis Drake Boulevard runs north from Ross, turns northwest at the Hub, and then proceeds west to Fairfax. Red Hill Avenue (also called "The Miracle Mile") runs west from San Rafael, after 4th Street and 3rd Street merge, and into the Hub where it becomes Center Boulevard. Center Boulevard runs northwest from the Hub to Fairfax and Sir Francis Drake parallels Center Boulevard to Fairfax, offset to the north.

The town's natural skyline is dominated by the hills of Ross Valley. To the north are Red Hill and Grove Hill. To the southwest is Bald Hill. To the east is Moore Hill. In the distance to the south is Mount Tamalpais.

A large part of southern and western San Anselmo is built on a natural floodplain. About every 15–23 years, heavy rains cause San Anselmo Creek to flood the center of town by up to 4 feet—1925, 1940 (11.38 in or 289 mm rainfall in 3 days), 1963, January 1982, as well as December 30/31, 2005. The worst flood, on January 2, 1982 (the highest creek water level, according to interviews with longtime creek-side residents) was preceded by a rainfall amount that exceeded 8 in (200 mm) in 12 hours.

San Anselmo's historic raised railroad bed (now Center Boulevard), acts as a dike, providing some flood protection to the west-side houses, upstream of the business district.

A number of homes on the floodplain (called the "Flatlands" by the Town) as far back as at least 1920, have been built with raised foundations to accommodate the minor periodic floods.

Most of the downtown antique and boutique stores and restaurants, for which San Anselmo is well known, are along the banks of San Anselmo Creek.

== Demographics ==
Historical population
Census	Pop.	Note	%±
1910	1,531		—
1920	2,475		61.7%
1930	4,650		87.9%
1940	5,790		24.5%
1950	9,188		58.7%
1960	11,584		26.1%
1970	13,031		12.5%
1980	12,067		−7.4%
1990	11,743		−2.7%
2000	12,378		5.4%
2010	12,336		−0.3%
2020	12,830		4.0%
2025 (est.)	12,555	▼	−2.1%
U.S. Decennial Census; 1860–1870 1880-1890; 1900 1910 1920; 1930 1940 1950; 1960 1970 1980; 1990 2000 2010; 2020

=== 2020 census ===
As of the 2020 census, San Anselmo had a population of 12,830 and a population density of 4,796.3 inhabitants per square mile (1,851.9/km^{2}). The median age was 47.2 years. 22.4% of residents were under the age of 18 and 20.7% were 65 years of age or older. The age distribution was 5.8% aged 18 to 24, 18.3% aged 25 to 44, and 32.7% aged 45 to 64. For every 100 females, there were 89.8 males, and for every 100 females age 18 and over, there were 86.5 males age 18 and over.

The census reported that 99.3% of the population lived in households, 0.5% lived in non-institutionalized group quarters, and 0.2% were institutionalized. 100.0% of residents lived in urban areas, while 0.0% lived in rural areas.

There were 5,225 households in San Anselmo, of which 32.9% had children under the age of 18 living in them. Of all households, 51.7% were married-couple households, 6.3% were cohabiting couple households, 14.4% had a male householder with no spouse or partner present, and 27.5% had a female householder with no spouse or partner present. About 26.9% of all households were made up of individuals and 12.9% had someone living alone who was 65 years of age or older. The average household size was 2.44. There were 3,437 families (65.8% of all households).

There were 5,518 housing units at an average density of 2,062.8 units per square mile (796.5 units/km^{2}). Of all housing units, 5.3% were vacant and 94.7% were occupied. Of occupied units, 67.1% were owner-occupied and 32.9% were occupied by renters. The homeowner vacancy rate was 0.8% and the rental vacancy rate was 4.0%.

Racial composition as of the 2020 census
Race	Number	Percent
White	10,392	81.0%
Black or African American	100	0.8%
American Indian and Alaska Native	45	0.4%
Asian	450	3.5%
Native Hawaiian and Other Pacific Islander	12	0.1%
Some other race	387	3.0%
Two or more races	1,444	11.3%
Hispanic or Latino (of any race)	1,180	9.2%

=== Income and poverty ===
In 2023, the US Census Bureau estimated that the median household income in 2023 was $170,457, and the per capita income was $98,602. About 1.3% of families and 5.3% of the population were below the poverty line.

=== 2010 census ===
At the 2010 census San Anselmo had a population of 12,336. The population density was 4,607.9 inhabitants per square mile (1,779.1/km^{2}). The racial makeup of San Anselmo was 11,134 (90.3%) White, 106 (0.9%) African American, 40 (0.3%) Native American, 437 (3.5%) Asian, 26 (0.2%) Pacific Islander, 164 (1.3%) from other races, and 429 (3.5%) from two or more races. Hispanic or Latino of any race were 717 people (5.8%).

The census reported that 99.6% of the population lived in households and 0.4% lived in non-institutionalized group quarters.

There were 5,243 households, 1,695 (32.3%) had children under the age of 18 living in them, 2,607 (49.7%) were opposite-sex married couples living together, 471 (9.0%) had a female householder with no husband present, 173 (3.3%) had a male householder with no wife present. There were 273 (5.2%) unmarried opposite-sex partnerships, and 66 (1.3%) same-sex married couples or partnerships. 1,564 households (29.8%) were one person and 484 (9.2%) had someone living alone who was 65 or older. The average household size was 2.34. There were 3,251 families (62.0% of households); the average family size was 2.93.

The age distribution was 2,879 people (23.3%) under the age of 18, 500 people (4.1%) aged 18 to 24, 2,804 people (22.7%) aged 25 to 44, 4,492 people (36.4%) aged 45 to 64, and 1,661 people (13.5%) who were 65 or older. The median age was 44.9 years. For every 100 females, there were 87.4 males. For every 100 females age 18 and over, there were 85.6 males.

There were 5,538 housing units at an average density of 2,068.6 per square mile, of the occupied units 3,484 (66.5%) were owner-occupied and 1,759 (33.5%) were rented. The homeowner vacancy rate was 1.2%; the rental vacancy rate was 4.5%. 8,849 people (71.7% of the population) lived in owner-occupied housing units and 3,434 people (27.8%) lived in rental housing units.

== Government and politics ==
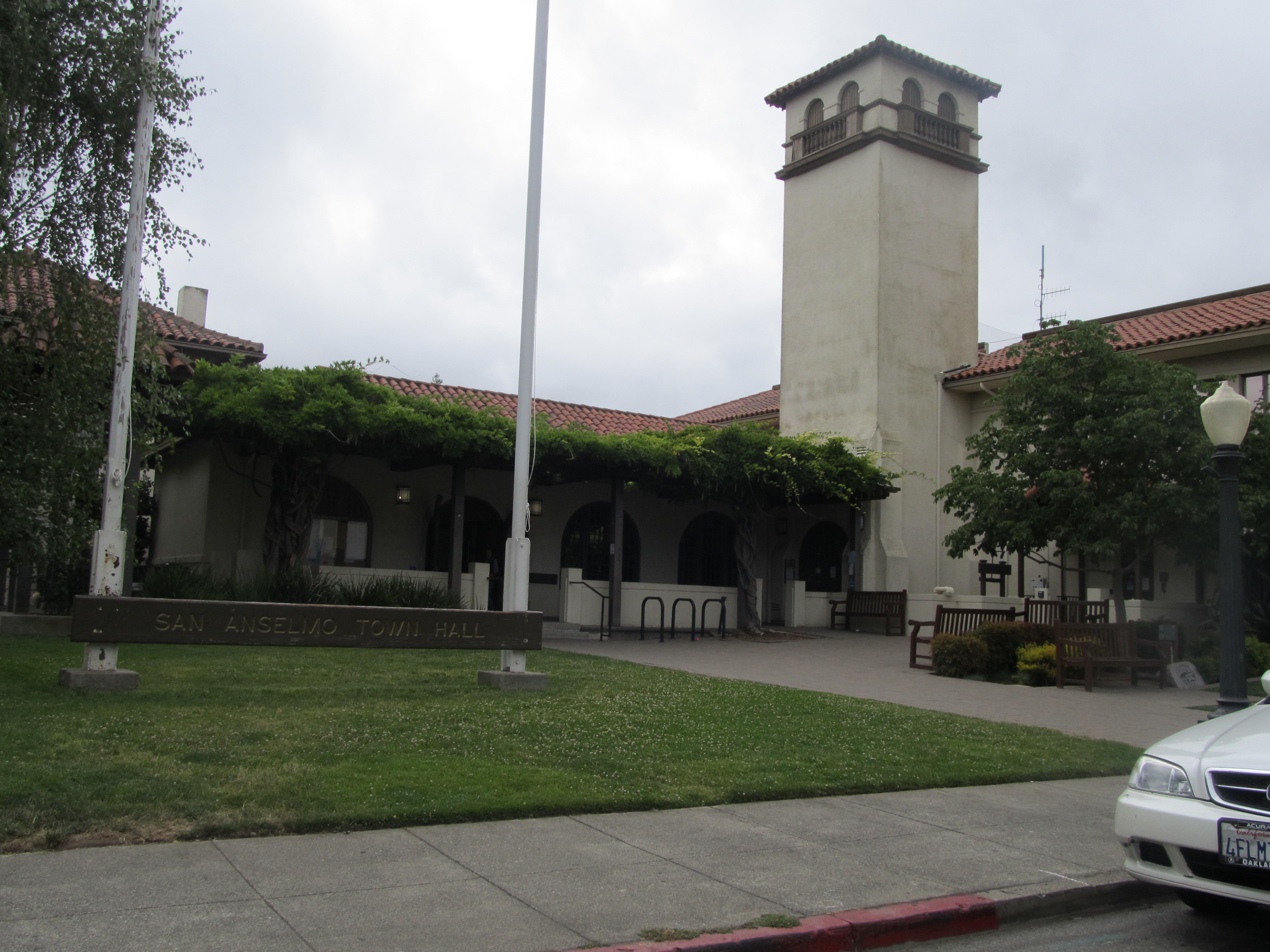
San Anselmo Town Hall

San Anselmo has a council–manager form of government, in which an elected town council creates policy and hires a town manager to implement the policy. The five-member town council is elected by the voters at large. The posts of mayor and vice-mayor rotate among the council. San Anselmo's current mayor is Tarrell Kullaway and the Town Manager is David P. Donery.

The town of San Anselmo is the second-most Democratic political subdivision in Marin County (behind only Fairfax). According to the Secretary of State of California, as of October 22, 2012, San Anselmo has 8,622 registered voters. Of those, 5,361 (62.2%) are registered Democrats, 994 (11.5%) are registered Republicans, 1,806 (21.0%) decline to state a political party, and 461 are registered with other parties.

Since 2013 police services have been provided by the Central Marin Police Authority, which also polices the nearby towns of Corte Madera, Larkspur, and portions of Greenbrae.

=== Federal and state representation ===
In the United States House of Representatives, San Anselmo is in California's 2nd congressional district, represented by Democrat Jared Huffman. From 2008 to 2012, Huffman represented Marin County in the California State Assembly.

In the California State Legislature, San Anselmo is in:

- the 12th Assembly district, represented by Democrat Damon Connolly
- the 2nd senatorial district, represented by Democrat Mike McGuire.

=== Presidential election results ===
San Anselmo is an overwhelmingly Democratic city in presidential elections. In 2012, Barack Obama received 83.10% of the vote, and in 2016, Hillary Clinton received 85.43% of the vote.

== Notable people ==
- Dave Anthony (born 1967), comedian, actor, screenwriter, and podcaster.
- Arj Barker (born 1974), stand-up comedian; attended Sir Francis Drake High School.
- John Boccabella (born 1941), former Major League Baseball player
- Terry Bozzio (born 1950), drummer, percussionist, and vocalist with Frank Zappa and founder of the new wave group Missing Persons.
- David Fincher, film director
- Gary Fisher (born 1950), inventor of the mountain bike; opened his first store, MountainBikes, in San Anselmo.
- Dana Gilbert (born 1959), tennis player
- Bart Hopkin (born 1952), inventor of experimental musical instruments
- Jane Levy (born in Los Angeles 1989), actress; raised in San Anselmo
- George Lucas (born in Modesto 1944), film director, screenwriter, producer, and entrepreneur
- Don Novello (Fairfax 1943), comedian
- Joe Ryan (born 1996), Major League Baseball player for the Minnesota Twins
- Mary Ann Shaffer (1934–2008), writer; lived and died in San Anselmo
- Ali Akbar Khan, sarod player, composer
- Zakir Hussain, tabla maestro
- Neal Schon, guitarist of rock band Journey
- Michael Schwab (born 1952), graphic designer and illustrator; his design studio is in San Anselmo.
- Scott Thunes (born 1960), bass guitarist with Frank Zappa, Wayne Kramer, Steve Vai, Andy Prieboy, Mike Keneally, Fear, The Waterboys, Big Bang Beat, and others. Raised in San Anselmo.

== Schools ==
San Anselmo is in the Ross Valley Elementary School District and the Tamalpais Union High School District.

San Anselmo is home to a variety of schools:

- Brookside Elementary School of the Ross Valley School District grades K–5
- Hidden Valley Elementary School, Ross Valley School District, grades K–5
- Wade Thomas Elementary School, Ross Valley School District, grades K–5
- White Hill Middle School, Ross Valley School District, grades 6–8 (located in nearby Fairfax, San Anselmo residents attend)
- Saint Anselm's Catholic School, a private school founded in 1924 by the Catholic Church; grades K-8
- San Domenico School, co-ed pre-kindergarten through 12th with boarding facilities
- Archie Williams High School, Tamalpais Union High School District, grades 9–12 (formerly known as Sir Francis Drake)
- San Francisco Theological Seminary, a part of the Presbyterian Church (USA) system of seminaries, now part of the University of the Redlands
