= Lagunitas-Forest Knolls, California =

Lagunitas-Forest Knolls
- Census-designated place
- Location in Marin County and the state of California

- Location in the United States
- Coordinates: 38°0′54″N 122°41′38″W
- Country: United States
- State: California
- County: Marin

Government
  - County Board: District 4 Dennis Rodoni
  - State Senate: Mike McGuire (D)
  - Assembly: Damon Connolly (D)
  - U. S. Congress: Jared Huffman (D)

Area
  - Total: 4.246 sq mi (11.00 km^{2})
  - Land: 4.246 sq mi (11.00 km^{2})
  - Water: 0 sq mi (0 km^{2}) 0%

Population (2020)
  - Total: 1,924
  - Density: 453.1/sq mi (175.0/km^{2})
- Time zone: UTC-8 (PST)
  - Summer (DST): UTC-7 (PDT)
- ZIP codes: 94933 (Forest Hills); 94938 (Lagunitas)
- Area codes: 415/628
- FIPS code: 06-39283

Lagunitas-Forest Knolls is a census-designated place, composed of two unincorporated areas in the western half of the San Geronimo Valley in Marin County, California, United States. It is located to the west of San Geronimo and Woodacre. The population was 1,924 at the 2020 census.

The two towns are locally seen as separate. Geographically divided by narrow points in the San Geronimo Valley, each has its own small commercial center. Both towns are primarily residential. The ZIP code of Lagunitas is 94938, while the ZIP code of Forest Knolls is 94933.

== Geography ==
Lagunitas-Forest Knolls is located at 38°0′54″N 122°41′38″W (38.015064, -122.693874).

According to the U.S. Census Bureau, the CDP has a total area of 11.0 square kilometers (4.2 sq mi), all land.

San Geronimo Creek (a.k.a. Paper Mill Creek), one of the few remaining spawning grounds for Coho salmon (Oncorhynchus kisutch), runs through both towns. Lagunitas Creek, a tributary to San Geronimo Creek, is home to the largest remaining wild run of Coho salmon in Central California. These Coho are part of the Central California Coast Evolutionarily Significant Unit (CCC ESU), and are listed as "endangered" at both the state and federal level.

The towns line the western end of the San Geronimo Valley, extending into the forested south ridges and slightly into the grassier northern ones.

Lagunitas is on the eastern border of Samuel P. Taylor State Park. Like the park, Lagunitas-Forest Knolls and the surrounding environs are lushly vegetated with large areas of coniferous forests.

Hiking and horseback riding are popular in the hills above the towns.

== Demographics ==
Historical population
| Census | Pop. | Note | %± |
|---|---|---|---|
| 1980 | 1,465 | | — |
| 1990 | 1,821 | | 24.3% |
| 2000 | 1,835 | | 0.8% |
| 2010 | 1,819 | | −0.9% |
| 2020 | 1,924 | | 5.8% |
U.S. Decennial Census; 1860–1870 1880-1890; 1900 1910 1920; 1930 1940 1950; 1960 1970 1980; 1990 2000 2010; 2020

Lagunitas-Forest Knolls first appeared as a census designated place in the 1980 United States census.

=== Racial and ethnic composition ===
Lagunitas-Forest Knolls CDP, California – Racial and ethnic composition Note: the US Census treats Hispanic/Latino as an ethnic category. This table excludes Latinos from the racial categories and assigns them to a separate category. Hispanics/Latinos may be of any race.
| Race / Ethnicity (NH = Non-Hispanic) | Pop 2000 | Pop 2010 | Pop 2020 | % 2000 | % 2010 | % 2020 |
|---|---|---|---|---|---|---|
| White alone (NH) | 1,599 | 1,583 | 1,543 | 87.14% | 87.03% | 80.20% |
| Black or African American alone (NH) | 26 | 25 | 19 | 1.42% | 1.37% | 0.99% |
| Native American or Alaska Native alone (NH) | 11 | 3 | 12 | 0.60% | 0.16% | 0.62% |
| Asian alone (NH) | 25 | 10 | 38 | 1.36% | 0.55% | 1.98% |
| Native Hawaiian or Pacific Islander alone (NH) | 2 | 1 | 0 | 0.11% | 0.05% | 0.00% |
| Other race alone (NH) | 14 | 9 | 21 | 0.76% | 0.49% | 1.09% |
| Mixed race or Multiracial (NH) | 56 | 55 | 137 | 3.05% | 3.02% | 7.12% |
| Hispanic or Latino (any race) | 102 | 133 | 154 | 5.56% | 7.31% | 8.00% |
| Total | 1,835 | 1,819 | 1,924 | 100.00% | 100.00% | 100.00% |

=== 2020 census ===
As of the 2020 census, Lagunitas-Forest Knolls had a population of 1,924. The population density was 453.1 inhabitants per square mile (174.9/km^{2}). The racial makeup of Lagunitas-Forest Knolls was 1,589 (82.6%) White, 20 (1.0%) African American, 22 (1.1%) Native American, 38 (2.0%) Asian, 0 (0.0%) Pacific Islander, 54 (2.8%) from other races, and 201 (10.4%) from two or more races. Hispanic or Latino of any race were 154 persons (8.0%).

The census reported that 99.3% of the population lived in households, 0.7% lived in non-institutionalized group quarters, and no one was institutionalized. 0.0% of residents lived in urban areas, while 100.0% lived in rural areas.

There were 820 households, out of which 166 (20.2%) had children under the age of 18 living in them, 355 (43.3%) were married-couple households, 79 (9.6%) were cohabiting couple households, 218 (26.6%) had a female householder with no partner present, and 168 (20.5%) had a male householder with no partner present. 250 households (30.5%) were one person, and 127 (15.5%) were one person aged 65 or older. The average household size was 2.33. There were 481 families (58.7% of all households).

The age distribution was 287 people (14.9%) under the age of 18, 87 people (4.5%) aged 18 to 24, 413 people (21.5%) aged 25 to 44, 607 people (31.5%) aged 45 to 64, and 530 people (27.5%) who were 65 years of age or older. The median age was 51.3 years. For every 100 females, there were 96.5 males, and for every 100 females age 18 and over there were 96.0 males age 18 and over.

There were 866 housing units at an average density of 204.0 units per square mile (78.8 units/km^{2}), of which 820 (94.7%) were occupied. Of these, 564 (68.8%) were owner-occupied, and 256 (31.2%) were occupied by renters. Of all housing units, 5.3% were vacant. The homeowner vacancy rate was 0.0%, and the rental vacancy rate was 4.5%.

=== Income and poverty ===
In 2023, the US Census Bureau estimated that the median household income was $128,656, and the per capita income was $75,201. About 3.7% of families and 12.2% of the population were below the poverty line.

=== 2010 census ===
At the 2010 census Lagunitas-Forest Knolls had a population of 1,819. The population density was 428.3 inhabitants per square mile (165.4/km^{2}). The racial makeup of Lagunitas-Forest Knolls was 1,658 (91.1%) White, 26 (1.4%) African American, 11 (0.6%) Native American, 11 (0.6%) Asian, 1 (0.1%) Pacific Islander, 43 (2.4%) from other races, and 69 (3.8%) from two or more races. Hispanic or Latino of any race were 133 people (7.3%).

The census reported that 99.5% of the population lived in households and 0.5% lived in non-institutionalized group quarters.

There were 817 households, 213 (26.1%) had children under the age of 18 living in them, 354 (43.3%) were opposite-sex married couples living together, 86 (10.5%) had a female householder with no husband present, 40 (4.9%) had a male householder with no wife present. There were 57 (7.0%) unmarried opposite-sex partnerships, and 10 (1.2%) same-sex married couples or partnerships. 259 households (31.7%) were one person and 45 (5.5%) had someone living alone who was 65 or older. The average household size was 2.22. There were 480 families (58.8% of households); the average family size was 2.78.

The age distribution was 342 people (18.8%) under the age of 18, 94 people (5.2%) aged 18 to 24, 339 people (18.6%) aged 25 to 44, 808 people (44.4%) aged 45 to 64, and 236 people (13.0%) who were 65 or older. The median age was 48.9 years. For every 100 females, there were 94.8 males. For every 100 females age 18 and over, there were 97.5 males.

There were 897 housing units at an average density of 211.2 per square mile (81.5/km^{2}), of which 66.7% were owner-occupied and 33.3% were occupied by renters. The homeowner vacancy rate was 1.6%; the rental vacancy rate was 3.2%. 71.4% of the population lived in owner-occupied housing units and 28.1% lived in rental housing units.

== Education ==
The CDP is served by the Lagunitas Elementary School District and the Tamalpais Union High School District.
