= Ross Valley =

Valley in California, United States

Coordinates: 37.948813°N 122.544977°W

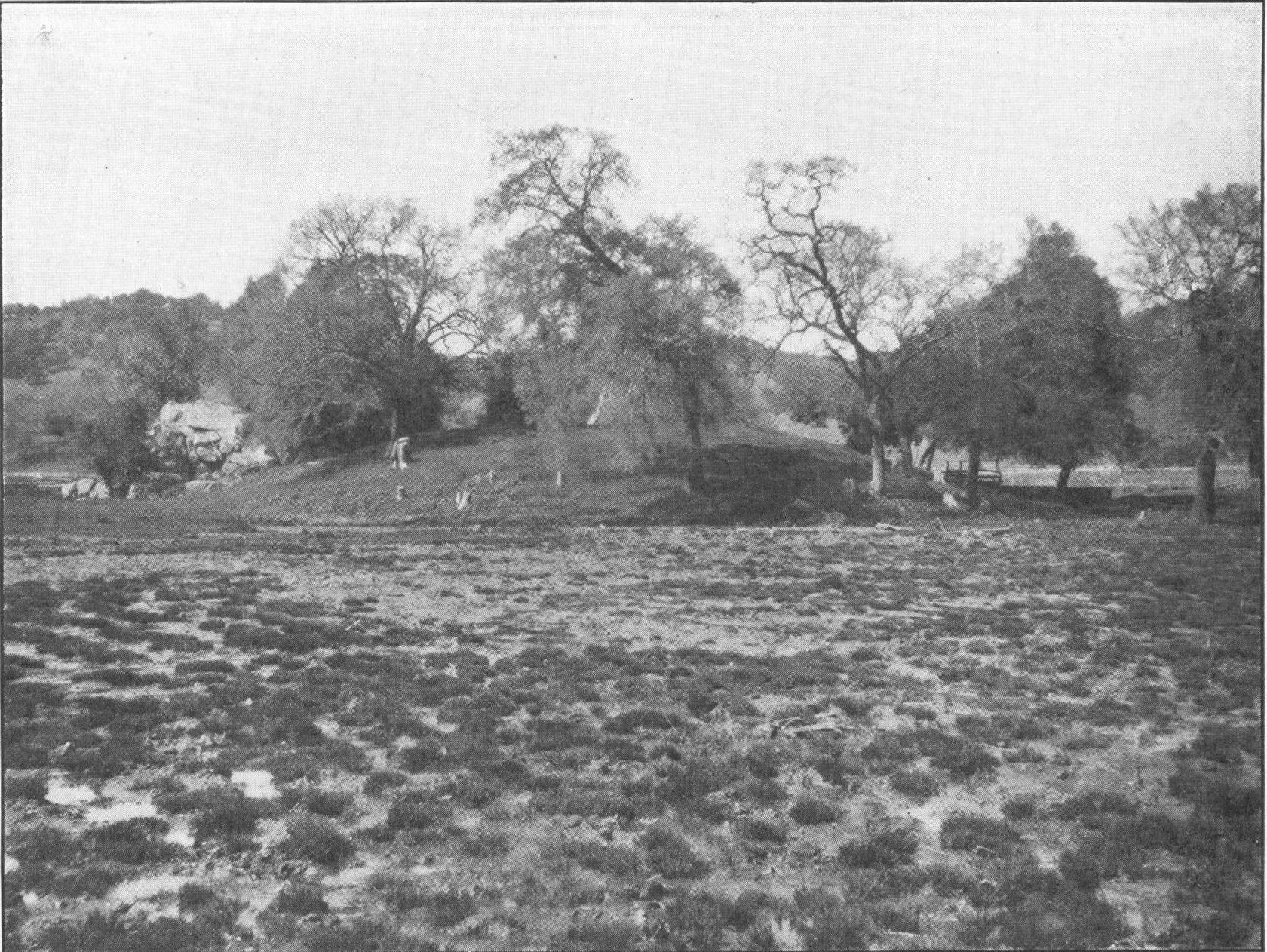
Coast Miwok shellmound in Ross Valley, Marin County, California, USA

Ross Valley is a valley in Marin County, California. The city of Ross in addition to all or portions of San Anselmo, Fairfax, Kentfield, and San Rafael are located in the valley. Mount Tamalpais is to the west, the Red Hills to the North and San Francisco Bay to the East.
