= San Geronimo Valley =

Valley in California, United States

Coordinates: 38.017°N 122.68°W

Naming
- Native name: sah-ta-ko (Coast Miwok); Arroyo de San Gerónimo (Spanish)

Geography
- Location: Marin County, California, United States
- Population centers: Woodacre; San Geronimo; Forest Knolls; Lagunitas
- Traversed by: Sir Francis Drake Boulevard
- Rivers: San Geronimo Creek
- Interactive map of San Geronimo Valley

San Geronimo Valley is located in Marin County, California, composed of four unincorporated towns: Woodacre, San Geronimo, Forest Knolls, and Lagunitas. It is a fairly close-knit community, with a rather liberal citizenry. The farther west one goes along the valley, the more forested the land becomes. The valley is bisected roughly east-to-west by Sir Francis Drake Boulevard; a number of streets in the towns along this road were constructed on the former right-of-way of the Northwestern Pacific Railroad. The valley has numerous hiking/biking trails. Most of the residents reside on the south, shadier, side of the valley.

== History ==
The San Geronimo Valley (Coast Miwok: sah-ta-ko; Spanish: Arroyo de San Gerónimo) derives its name from Rancho San Geronimo. The ranch was purchased by Adolph Mailliard and Ann Eliza Ward in 1868, where they bred thoroughbred horses, including the famous stallion Monday, who sired most of the race horses in California. Both had come from prominent backgrounds in Europe and the Eastern United States. Adolph was the son of Louis Maillard, the secretary to Joseph Bonaparte, the king of Naples and Spain during the Napoleonic era, who had emigrated to the United States after the fall of Napoleon. Ann was a descendent of the Ward family of Rhode Island and New York, and was the sister of Julia Ward Howe, who composed the lyrics to the "Battle Hymn of the Republic". Their son, who grew up on the ranch, was ornithologist Joseph Mailliard. Marin County business leader and congressman William S. Maillard was a direct descendent of theirs. The Mailliard family owned the property until the 1910s.

== Schools ==
The Valley is part of the Lagunitas School District, unique in that it operates two alternative elementary programs and a traditional middle school program on two connected campuses with one superintendent, one principal, and one school board. Each elementary program (Open Classroom, Montessori-inspired) has its own unique philosophy and pedagogical methods, all working within the framework of the California professional and academic standards. Each program involves parent participation to some degree.

== Features ==
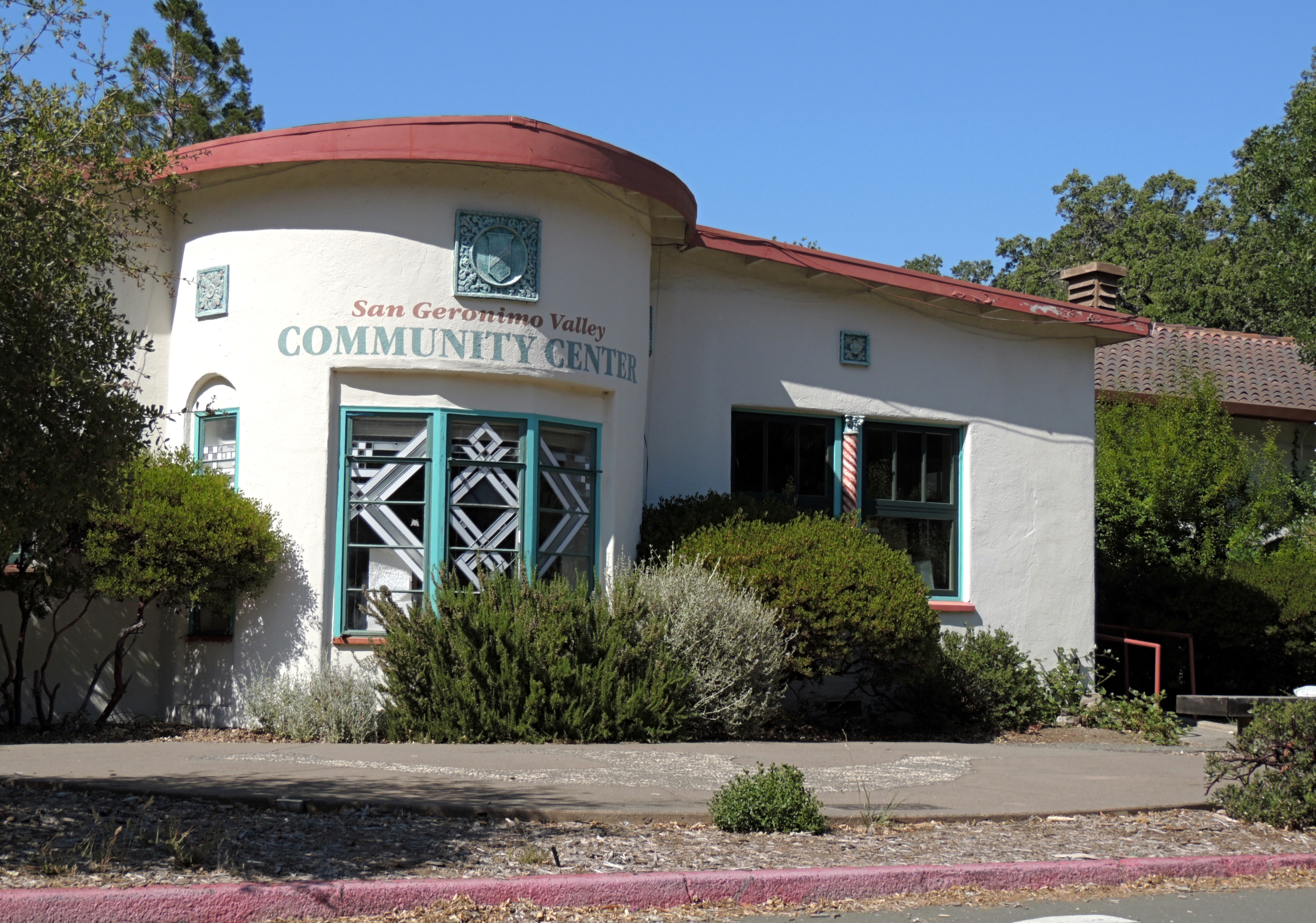
The San Geronimo Valley Community Center

Woodacre is home to Spirit Rock Meditation Center, dedicated to the teachings of Buddha and Vipasannā mediation; Dickson Ranch, Creekside Equestrian Center, and the Marin County Fire Department headquarters. San Geronimo Valley also comprises the greater part of the Lagunitas Watershed, where some of the last remaining coho salmon spawn. The San Geronimo Valley Community Center, attached to the school district, is a hub for community events and hosts the local food bank.

== See also ==
- San Geronimo Creek
