= Forest Knolls, Marin County, California =

Unincorporated community in California, United States

Forest Knolls
- Unincorporated community
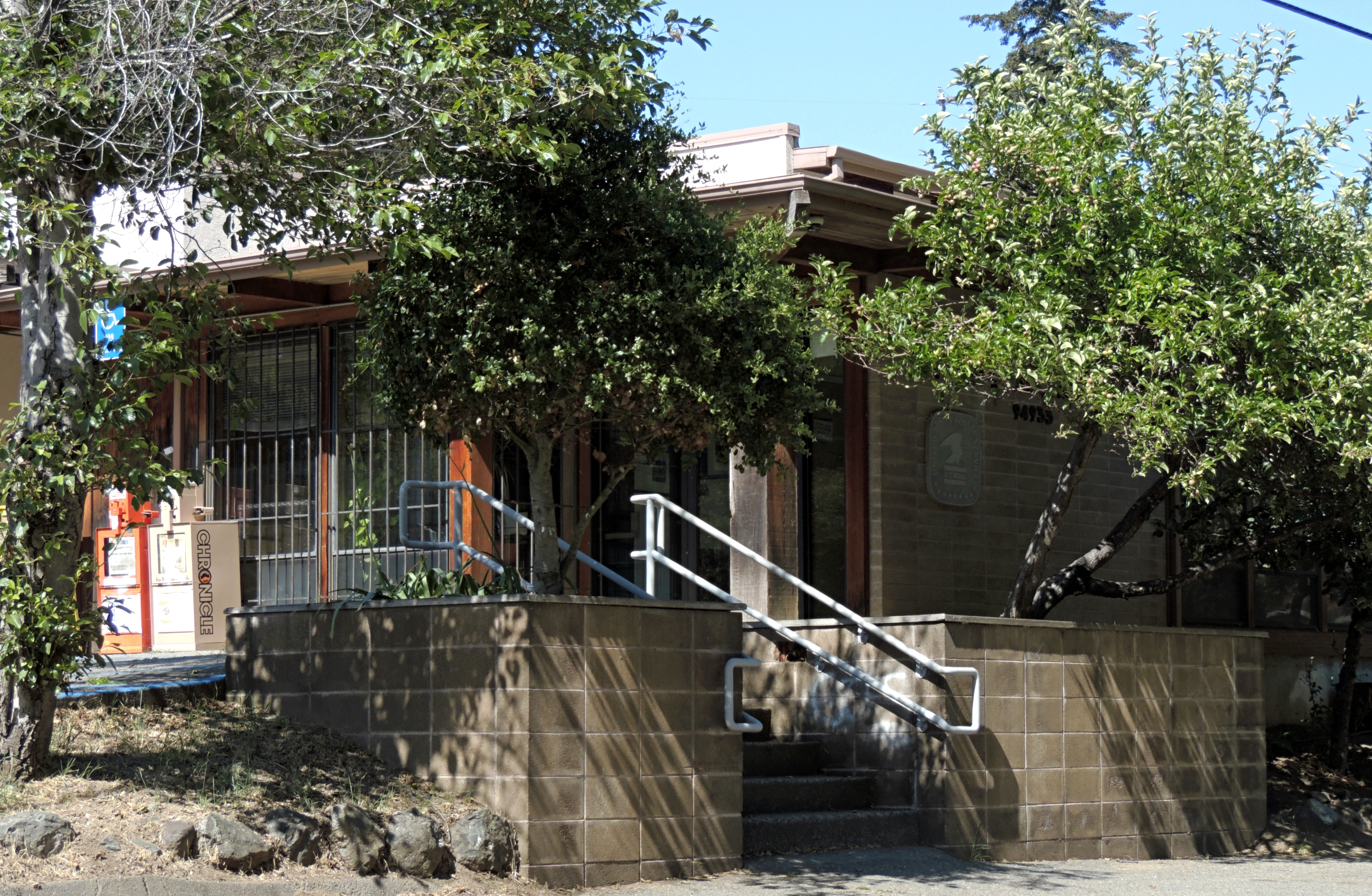
- Forest Knolls Post Office

- Location in California Forest Knolls (the United States)
- Coordinates: 38°00′55″N 122°41′19″W
- Country: United States
- State: California
- County: Marin
- Elevation: 249 ft (76 m)

Forest Knolls is an unincorporated community in Marin County, California, United States. It is located 9 miles (14 km) southwest of Novato, at an elevation of 249 feet (76 m). For census purposes, Forest Knolls is aggregated with Lagunitas into the census-designated place Lagunitas-Forest Knolls.

The first post office at Forest Knolls opened in 1916. Forest Knolls' ZIP Code is 94933.

== Notable person ==
- Franklin B. Morse (1873-1929), a sportswriter and star football player, owned a home in Forest Knolls, where he died in 1929.
