= Woodacre, California =

Woodacre
- Census-designated place
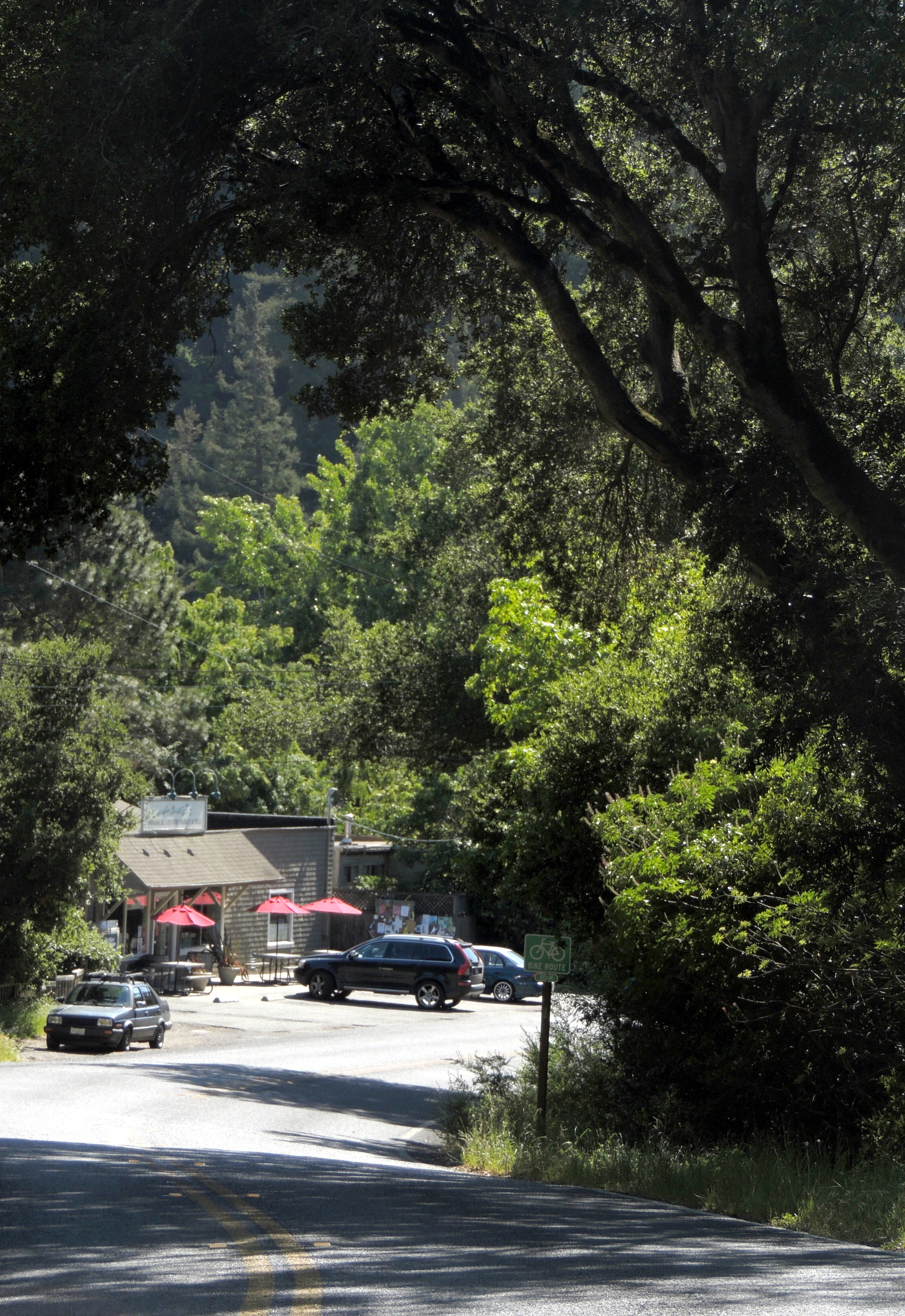
- Woodacre from the east

- Location in Marin County and the state of California

- Location in the United States
- Coordinates: 38°00′46″N 122°38′43″W
- Country: United States
- State: California
- County: Marin

Government
  - County Board: District 4 Dennis Rodoni
  - State Senate: Mike McGuire (D)
  - Assembly: Damon Connolly (D)
  - U.S. Congress: Jared Huffman (D)

Area
  - Total: 1.797 sq mi (4.653 km^{2})
  - Land: 1.797 sq mi (4.653 km^{2})
  - Water: 0 sq mi (0 km^{2}) 0%
- Elevation: 364 ft (111 m)

Population (2020)
  - Total: 1,410
  - Density: 785/sq mi (303/km^{2})
- Time zone: UTC-8 (PST)
  - Summer (DST): UTC-7 (PDT)
- ZIP code: 94973
- Area codes: 415/628
- FIPS code: 06-86216
- GNIS feature ID: 1652657

Woodacre is an unincorporated town and census-designated place (CDP) in Marin County, California, United States. The population was 1,410 at the 2020 census.

== Geography ==
The community is located at 38°00′46″N 122°38′43″W in the eastern half of the San Geronimo Valley of central Marin County. San Geronimo and Lagunitas-Forest Knolls are to its west. Woodacre is located 8 miles (13 km) south-southwest of Novato, and 8 miles northwest of San Rafael; the nearest incorporated town is Fairfax, 4 miles (6 km) east-southeast. At 364 feet (111 m), Woodacre has the highest base elevation in Marin County.

According to the United States Census Bureau, the CDP has a total area of 1.8 square miles (4.7 km^{2}), all land.

== History ==
The community began when promoters subdivided the place in 1912. In 1923, wildfires burned 35 of the 40 homes in Woodacre. The first post office opened in 1925.

== Demographics ==
Historical population
Census	Pop.	Note	%±
1980	1,300		—
1990	1,478		13.7%
2000	1,393		−5.8%
2010	1,348		−3.2%
2020	1,410		4.6%
U.S. Decennial Census; 1860–1870 1880-1890; 1900 1910 1920; 1930 1940 1950; 1960 1970 1980; 1990 2000 2010; 2020

Woodacre first appeared as a census designated place in the 1980 U.S. census.

=== Racial and ethnic composition ===
Woodacre CDP, California – Racial and ethnic composition Note: the US Census treats Hispanic/Latino as an ethnic category. This table excludes Latinos from the racial categories and assigns them to a separate category. Hispanics/Latinos may be of any race.
Race / Ethnicity (NH = Non-Hispanic)	Pop 2000	Pop 2010	Pop 2020	% 2000	% 2010	% 2020
White alone (NH)	1,273	1,186	1,180	91.39%	87.98%	83.69%
Black or African American alone (NH)	6	3	4	0.43%	0.22%	0.28%
Native American or Alaska Native alone (NH)	5	2	2	0.36%	0.15%	0.14%
Asian alone (NH)	13	27	28	0.93%	2.00%	1.99%
Native Hawaiian or Pacific Islander alone (NH)	0	4	0	0.00%	0.30%	0.00%
Other race alone (NH)	8	4	8	0.57%	0.30%	0.57%
Mixed race or Multiracial (NH)	28	45	91	2.01%	3.34%	6.45%
Hispanic or Latino (any race)	60	77	97	4.31%	5.71%	6.88%
Total	1,393	1,348	1,410	100.00%	100.00%	100.00%

=== 2020 census ===
As of the 2020 census, Woodacre had a population of 1,410. The population density was 784.6 inhabitants per square mile (302.9/km^{2}). The whole population lived in households. 0.0% of residents lived in urban areas, while 100.0% lived in rural areas.

The median age was 52.9 years. 16.2% of residents were under the age of 18, 5.0% were age 18 to 24, 14.9% were age 25 to 44, 32.1% were age 45 to 64, and 31.8% were 65 years of age or older. For every 100 females there were 94.2 males, and for every 100 females age 18 and over there were 89.9 males age 18 and over.

There were 612 households, of which 20.9% had children under the age of 18. Of all households, 48.0% were married-couple households, 6.9% were cohabiting couple households, 21.2% were households with a male householder and no spouse or partner present, and 23.9% were households with a female householder and no spouse or partner present. About 28.8% of all households were made up of individuals, and 17.7% had someone living alone who was 65 years of age or older. The average household size was 2.3. There were 386 families (63.1% of all households).

There were 650 housing units at an average density of 361.7 units per square mile (139.7 units/km^{2}), of which 612 (94.2%) were occupied. Of occupied units, 75.8% were owner-occupied and 24.2% were occupied by renters. Of all units, 5.8% were vacant. The homeowner vacancy rate was 0.4%, and the rental vacancy rate was 0.7%.

=== 2023 estimates ===
In 2023, the US Census Bureau estimated that the median household income was $225,521, and the per capita income was $87,336. About 4.5% of families and 8.3% of the population were below the poverty line.

== Education ==
Almost all of the community is in the Lagunitas Elementary School District while a small portion is in the Ross Valley Elementary School District. All of it is in the Tamalpais Union High School District.

== Notable people ==
- Harold Jones (born 1940), drummer with Tony Bennett and Count Basie Orchestra
- Jack Kornfield (born 1945), founded Spirit Rock Meditation Center in Woodacre in 1987
- Victor Moscoso (born 1936), known primarily for psychedelic posters and Zap Comix
- Gage Taylor (1942–2000), artist known for his psychedelic-inspired landscapes
- Robin Williams (1951–2014), actor; lived in Woodacre as a teenager
- William Windom (1923–2012), actor; retired to Woodacre and died there in 2012
- Clifford Geertz (1926–2006), cultural anthropologist; lived in Woodacre as a child and a teenager
