= San Geronimo, California =

San Geronimo
- Unincorporated Community; Census Designated Place
- Location in Marin County and the state of California

- Location in the United States
- Coordinates: 38°00′48″N 122°39′50″W
- Country: United States
- State: California
- County: Marin

Government
  - Supervisor: District 4 Dennis Rodoni
  - State senator: Mike McGuire (D)
  - Assemblymember: Damon Connolly (D)
  - U. S. rep.: Jared Huffman (D)

Area
  - Total: 1.508 sq mi (3.91 km^{2})
  - Land: 1.508 sq mi (3.91 km^{2})
  - Water: 0 sq mi (0 km^{2}) 0%
- Elevation: 292 ft (89 m)

Population (2020)
  - Total: 510
  - Density: 340/sq mi (130/km^{2})
- Time zone: UTC-8 (Pacific)
  - Summer (DST): UTC-7 (PDT)
- ZIP code: 94963
- Area codes: 415/628
- FIPS code: 06-67070
- GNIS feature ID: 232399

San Geronimo (Spanish: San Gerónimo, meaning "St. Jerome") is a census-designated place (CDP) located in the San Geronimo Valley in Marin County, California, United States. San Geronimo is bordered by Lagunitas-Forest Knolls to its west and Woodacre to its east. It is 8 miles (13 km) southwest of downtown Novato at an elevation of 292 feet (89 m). The population was 510 at the 2020 census.

== History ==
The first known map to depict the San Geronimo Valley was published in 1834. Prior to 1877, the place was called Nicasio. The San Geronimo post office opened in 1895, closed in 1910, and re-opened in 1911.

== Geography ==
San Geronimo is located at 38°00′48″N 122°39′50″W. According to the United States Census Bureau, the CDP has a total area of 1.5 square miles (3.9 km^{2}), all land.

San Geronimo was once the home of the San Geronimo Golf Course. In 2018, The Trust for Public Land purchased the 157-acre (64 ha) site and has opened it to public access as a park while it works to restore habitat and conduct a planning process for future use.

== Demographics ==
Historical population
Census	Pop.	Note	%±
2000	436		—
2010	446		2.3%
2020	510		14.3%
U.S. Decennial Census; 1860–1870 1880-1890; 1900 1910 1920; 1930 1940 1950; 1960 1970 1980; 1990 2000 2010; 2020

San Geronimo first appeared as a census designated place in the 2000 U.S. census formed out of part of the Lagunitas-Forest Knolls CDP and the Woodacre CDP.

=== Racial and ethnic composition ===
San Geronimo CDP, California – Racial and ethnic composition Note: the US Census treats Hispanic/Latino as an ethnic category. This table excludes Latinos from the racial categories and assigns them to a separate category. Hispanics/Latinos may be of any race.
Race / Ethnicity (NH = Non-Hispanic)	Pop 2000	Pop 2010	Pop 2020	% 2000	% 2010	% 2020
White alone (NH)	398	404	416	91.28%	90.58%	81.57%
Black or African American alone (NH)	4	3	8	0.92%	0.67%	1.57%
Native American or Alaska Native alone (NH)	3	2	2	0.69%	0.45%	0.39%
Asian alone (NH)	4	3	6	0.92%	0.67%	1.18%
Native Hawaiian or Pacific Islander alone (NH)	2	0	5	0.46%	0.00%	0.98%
Other race alone (NH)	1	2	5	0.23%	0.45%	0.98%
Mixed race or Multiracial (NH)	13	11	30	2.98%	2.47%	5.88%
Hispanic or Latino (any race)	11	21	38	2.52%	4.71%	7.45%
Total	436	446	510	100.00%	100.00%	100.00%

=== 2020 ===
The 2020 United States census reported that San Geronimo had a population of 510. The population density was 338.2 inhabitants per square mile (130.6/km^{2}). The racial makeup of San Geronimo was 426 (83.5%) White, 8 (1.6%) African American, 8 (1.6%) Native American, 6 (1.2%) Asian, 5 (1.0%) Pacific Islander, 9 (1.8%) from other races, and 48 (9.4%) from two or more races. Hispanic or Latino of any race were 38 persons (7.5%).

The census reported that 505 people (99.0% of the population) lived in households and 5 (1.0%) were institutionalized.

There were 198 households, out of which 61 (30.8%) had children under the age of 18 living in them, 122 (61.6%) were married-couple households, 17 (8.6%) were cohabiting couple households, 36 (18.2%) had a female householder with no partner present, and 23 (11.6%) had a male householder with no partner present. 39 households (19.7%) were one person, and 14 (7.1%) were one person aged 65 or older. The average household size was 2.55. There were 143 families (72.2% of all households).

The age distribution was 105 people (20.6%) under the age of 18, 12 people (2.4%) aged 18 to 24, 70 people (13.7%) aged 25 to 44, 163 people (32.0%) aged 45 to 64, and 160 people (31.4%) who were 65 years of age or older. The median age was 54.3 years. For every 100 females, there were 93.9 males.

There were 209 housing units at an average density of 138.6 units per square mile (53.5 units/km^{2}), of which 198 (94.7%) were occupied. Of these, 135 (68.2%) were owner-occupied, and 63 (31.8%) were occupied by renters.

=== 2010 ===
At the 2010 census San Geronimo had a population of 446. The population density was 295.8 inhabitants per square mile (114.2/km^{2}). The racial makeup of San Geronimo was 421 (94.4%) White, 3 (0.7%) African American, 2 (0.4%) Native American, 3 (0.7%) Asian, 3 (0.7%) from other races, and 14 (3.1%) from two or more races. Hispanic or Latino of any race were 21 people (4.7%).

The census reported that 100% of the population lived in households.

There were 199 households, 49 (24.6%) had children under the age of 18 living in them, 108 (54.3%) were opposite-sex married couples living together, 19 (9.5%) had a female householder with no husband present, 7 (3.5%) had a male householder with no wife present. There were 13 (6.5%) unmarried opposite-sex partnerships, and 2 (1.0%) same-sex married couples or partnerships. 43 households (21.6%) were one person and 9 (4.5%) had someone living alone who was 65 or older. The average household size was 2.24. There were 134 families (67.3% of households); the average family size was 2.60.

The age distribution was 72 people (16.1%) under the age of 18, 20 people (4.5%) aged 18 to 24, 89 people (20.0%) aged 25 to 44, 189 people (42.4%) aged 45 to 64, and 76 people (17.0%) who were 65 or older. The median age was 50.0 years. For every 100 females there were 97.3 males. For every 100 females age 18 and over, there were 94.8 males.

There were 208 housing units at an average density of 137.9 per square mile (53.2/km^{2}), of which 73.4% were owner-occupied and 26.6% were occupied by renters. The homeowner vacancy rate was 0%; the rental vacancy rate was 0%. 76.5% of the population lived in owner-occupied housing units and 23.5% lived in rental housing units.

=== 2000 ===
At the 2000 census, the median household income was $58,542 and the median family income was $60,875. Males had a median income of $70,536 versus $32,292 for females. The per capita income for the CDP was $31,960. About 9.9% of families and 10.4% of the population were below the poverty line, including 18.4% of those under age 18 and none of those age 65 or over.

== Education ==
San Geronimo is served by the Lagunitas Elementary School District and the Tamalpais Union High School District.
