= Marin County Board of Supervisors =

American local governing body in California

Type
- Type: Unicameral board of Marin County

Leadership
- President: Mary Sackett
- Vice President: Eric Lucan
- 2nd Vice President: Stephanie Moulton-Peters

Structure
- Seats: 5
- Political groups: Nonpartisan (5) (de jure)

Elections
- Last election: November 8, 2022
- Next election: November 5, 2024

Website
- marincounty.org/depts/bs

The Marin County Board of Supervisors is the governing body for the unincorporated areas of Marin County, California, in the San Francisco Bay Area's North Bay region. The current board members are Mary Sackett (District 1), Brian Colbert (District 2), Stephanie Moulton-Peters (District 3), Dennis Rodoni (District 4), and Eric Lucan (District 5).

The board functions as the authority for the County Free Library system, the Marin County Department of Parks and Open Space, (consisting of the Marin County Parks and Landscape Division and the Marin County Open Space District), Redevelopment Agency, Marin Transit, and County Housing Authority. The board also is in charge of the following services: public works, roads, voter registration, health and welfare programs, courts, district attorney, public defender, jail facilities, recording of official documents. Additionally, one member of the board is appointed to the Sonoma–Marin Area Rail Transit Board of Directors.

As in other counties the board provides municipal services for the unincorporated areas, such as: fire and police protection, planning, zoning, land use regulation, traffic regulation, and parks and recreation.

The board is in charge of enforcing the county code, commanding the Marin County Sheriff's Department, and creating or repealing county ordinances.

The supervisors also help nominate and appoint citizens to 61 different boards which vary from vector abatement, major crimes task force, youth commission, redevelopment councils to Oakland International Airport noise abatement.

Board of Supervisors meetings are held weekly on Tuesdays at 9:00 AM at the Board of Supervisors' Chambers in San Rafael, the seat of Marin County.

The board opposes the USA Patriot Act and the Homeland Security Act.

== Districts and members ==
- District 1 covers most of the city of San Rafael, as well as the unincorporated communities of Marinwood and Santa Venetia in Marin County. It is represented by Mary Sackett.
- District 2 covers the Ross Valley area in Central Marin County, including the cities of Fairfax, San Anselmo, and Ross as well as southwestern portions of San Rafael and most of the city of Larkspur. It is currently represented by Brian Colbert. Colbert succeeded Katie Rice who was appointed to the board in 2011 by Gov. Jerry Brown after former Supervisor Harold "Hal" C. Brown was diagnosed with pancreatic cancer. Supervisor Brown died in March 2012.
- District 3 covers the areas of Belvedere, Mill Valley, Tiburon, and Sausalito in southern Marin County. It was represented by Charles McGlashan, until his death. On May 22, 2011, California governor Jerry Brown appointed Kate Sears, then a supervising deputy attorney general, to serve out the late McGlashan's term. It is currently represented by Stephanie Moulton-Peters.
- District 4 covers the vast rural areas of West Marin in addition to Corte Madera and portions of Larkspur and San Rafael in east-central Marin along the San Francisco Bay shore. The district also serves portions of northern and western Novato. It is represented by Dennis Rodoni.
- District 5 covers the areas around Novato in northern Marin County. It is represented by Eric Lucan.
