= Richardson Island =

Former island in California

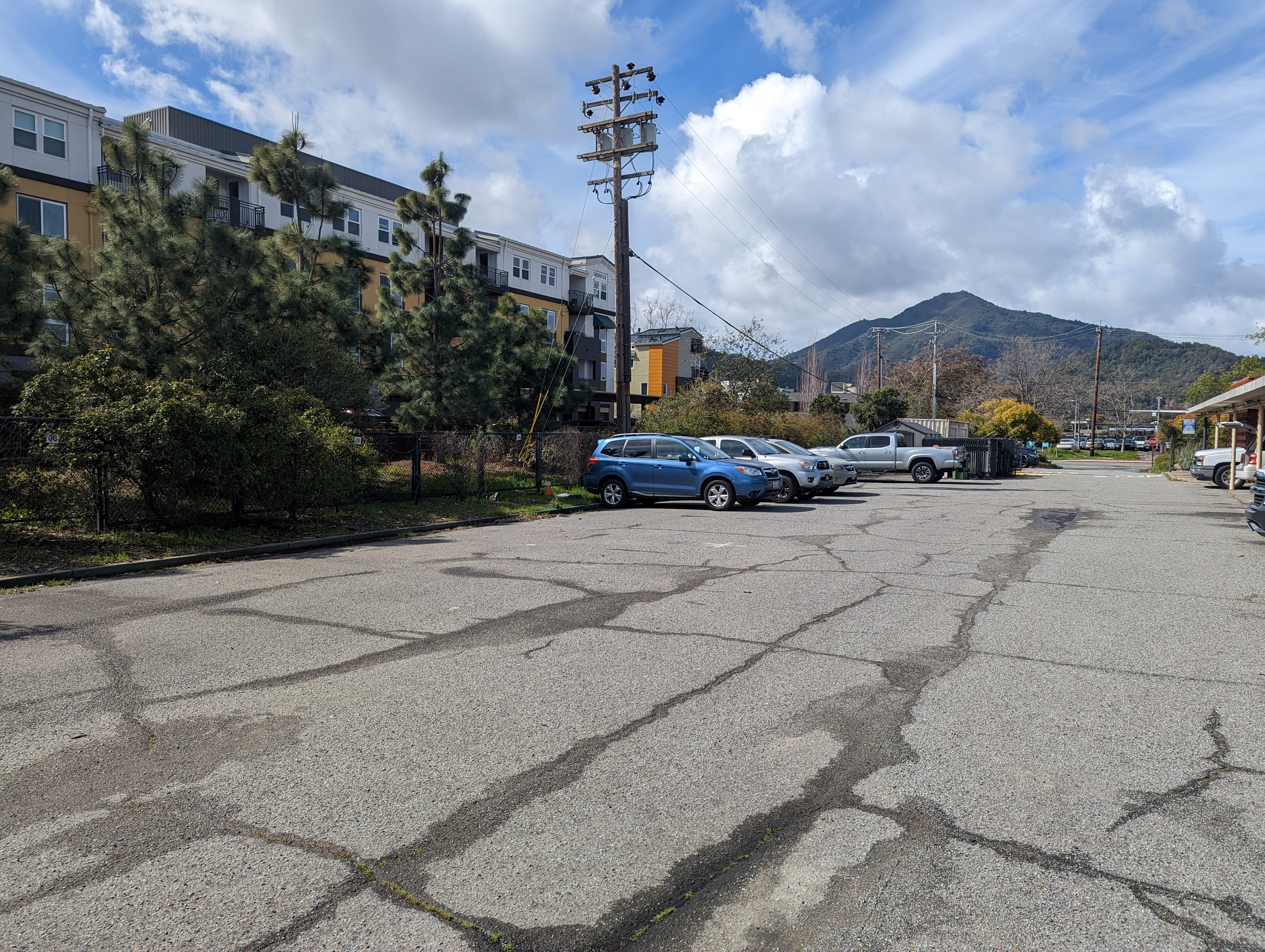
- The former location of Richardson Island, now a parking lot of the Marin Municipal Water District

- Location within San Francisco Bay Area Location within California Location within the United States

Geography
- Location: Northern California
- Coordinates: 37°56′12″N 122°31′04″W
- Adjacent to: San Francisco Bay
- Highest elevation: 16 ft (4.9 m)

Administration
- United States
- State: California
- County: Marin

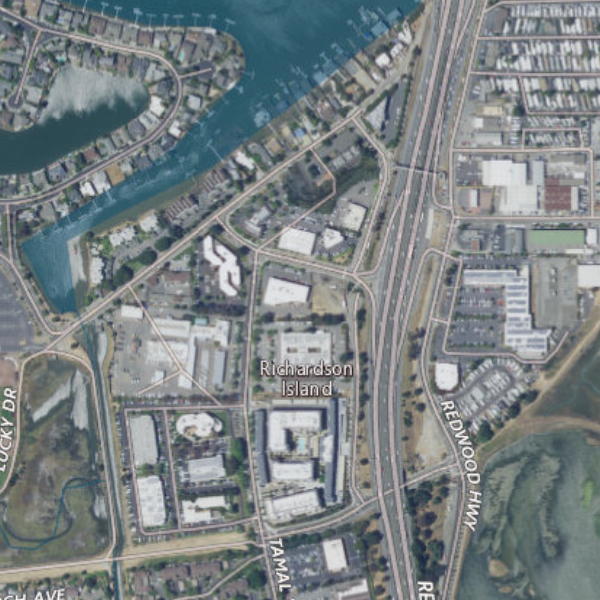
USGS aerial imagery of the former location of Richardson Island

Richardson Island is a former island in San Francisco Bay, in northern California. While it was once surrounded by water and marsh (and appears as an island in maps surveyed in 1894), development of surrounding areas caused it to become completely surrounded by land by the mid-20th century. It is located in Marin County, in the city of Corte Madera. The United States Geological Survey (USGS) gave its elevation as 16 ft (4.9 m) in 1981. It is near the end of Corte Madera Creek, where it flows into San Francisco Bay.

In 1885, it came into the possession of the Corte Madera Rancho del Presidio, one of the largest ranches in Marin County at the time. Its proprietors were sued by the United States in 1891, alleging that they had procured the island (among some 4,000 acres (1,600 ha) of land in the area) through a "false and fraudulent plot, alleged to have been made by field notes of an actual survey". In 1908, construction of railroad track for the Green Brae–Corte Madera cutoff involved workers cutting through the southeastern end of the island; by 1925, it had become part of the Keever estate. Henry Richardson, a member of the Amundsen polar expedition, was born on Richardson Island. By 1941, USGS maps show Richardson Island as completely connected to surrounding land; while the label "Richardson Island" was still shown at the location on a 1954 USGS map, by that point it was no longer an island.

In 1950, the city of Corte Madera engaged in an "annexation war" with neighboring Larkspur; Richardson Island was one of several pieces of land Corte Madera attempted to annex. Of four tracts, one was approved by the city to be annexed by ordinance—the "Fifer-Moore addition", located on Richardson Island. Larkspur had previously attempted to block annexation of the island by "cutting it off" from Corte Madera. By 2009, the area previously occupied by Richardson Island was part of Corte Madera, and primarily zoned for mixed-use commercial, mixed-use gateway area, and public and semi-public facilities. It was classified under the "Fifer Avenue/Tamal Vista" community plan study area.
