= Cascade Creek (San Anselmo Creek tributary) =

Stream in Marin County, United States of America

Location
- Country: United States
- State: California
- Region: Marin County
- City: Fairfax

Physical characteristics
- Source: White Hill, Marin Hills
  - coordinates: 37°59′37″N 122°37′44″W
  - elevation: 1,060 ft (320 m)
- Mouth: San Anselmo Creek
  - location: Fairfax, California
  - coordinates: 37°58′53″N 122°37′11″W
  - elevation: 230 ft (70 m)

Cascade Creek is a stream that flows south then southeast from its source on White Hill to its confluence with San Anselmo Creek just west of Fairfax in Marin County, California.

== Ecology ==
Although short on water by late summer, fisheries ecologist Dr. Alice Rich considered Cascade Creek to have the best Steelhead trout (Oncorhynchus mykiss) habitat in the Corte Madera Creek watershed. However, Cascade Falls presents an impassable barrier to steelhead spawning migrations. Rich also noted that Cascade Creek's steep gradient and low flow conditions were not suitable rearing habitat for juvenile trout, the latter typically spending a year in freshwater before outmigrating to San Francisco Bay.

Rich documented several anecdotal records for the occurrence of Coho salmon (Oncorhynchus kisutch) in tributaries of Corte Madera Creek, including Cascade Creek. According to Leidy, suitable habitat for coho salmon is present in Cascade Creek and most other Corte Madera Creek tributaries.

== See also ==
- San Anselmo Creek
- List of watercourses in the San Francisco Bay Area
