= Wood Island =

Wood Island may refer to:

- Wood Island, an alternate name for Yerba Buena Island in the San Francisco Bay, California, United States
- Wood Island (Marin County), in California
- Wood Island Light, a lighthouse on Wood Island in Saco Bay, Maine, United States
- Wood Island (MBTA station), a rapid transit station near Boston, Massachusetts, United States
- Wood Islands, Prince Edward Island in Queens County, Prince Edward Island, Canada
- Wood Island (New Brunswick), an island in the Bay of Fundy in New Brunswick, Canada
- Wood Island (Livingston Island), an island in the South Shetland Islands, Antarctica
- Wood Island, County Down in County Down, Northern Ireland
