= Wood Island (Marin County) =

Former island in California

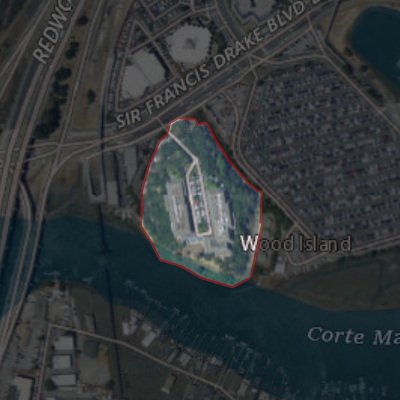
- USGS aerial imagery of Wood Island

- Location within San Francisco Bay Area Location within California Location within the United States

Geography
- Location: Northern California
- Coordinates: 37°56′37″N 122°30′42″W
- Adjacent to: Corte Madera Creek
- Highest elevation: 13 ft (4 m)

Administration
- United States
- State: California
- County: Marin

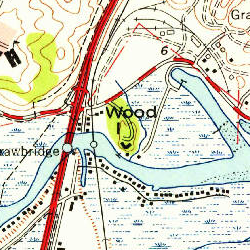
Little Island as it appears on a 1954 USGS topographic map.

Wood Island is a former island in Marin County, California, formerly in the Corte Madera Creek (upstream of San Francisco Bay) but now surrounded by land. Its coordinates are 37°56′37″N 122°30′42″W, and the United States Geological Survey measured its elevation as 13 ft (4.0 m) in 1981. It appears in a 1954 USGS map of the region. In the 1960s, its principal owner was Spero Spiliotis. In 1969, the city of Larkspur passed a resolution of intent to annex the island, and in the 1970s, a ferry terminal had been proposed.
