= Marin Hills =

Hills in California, United States

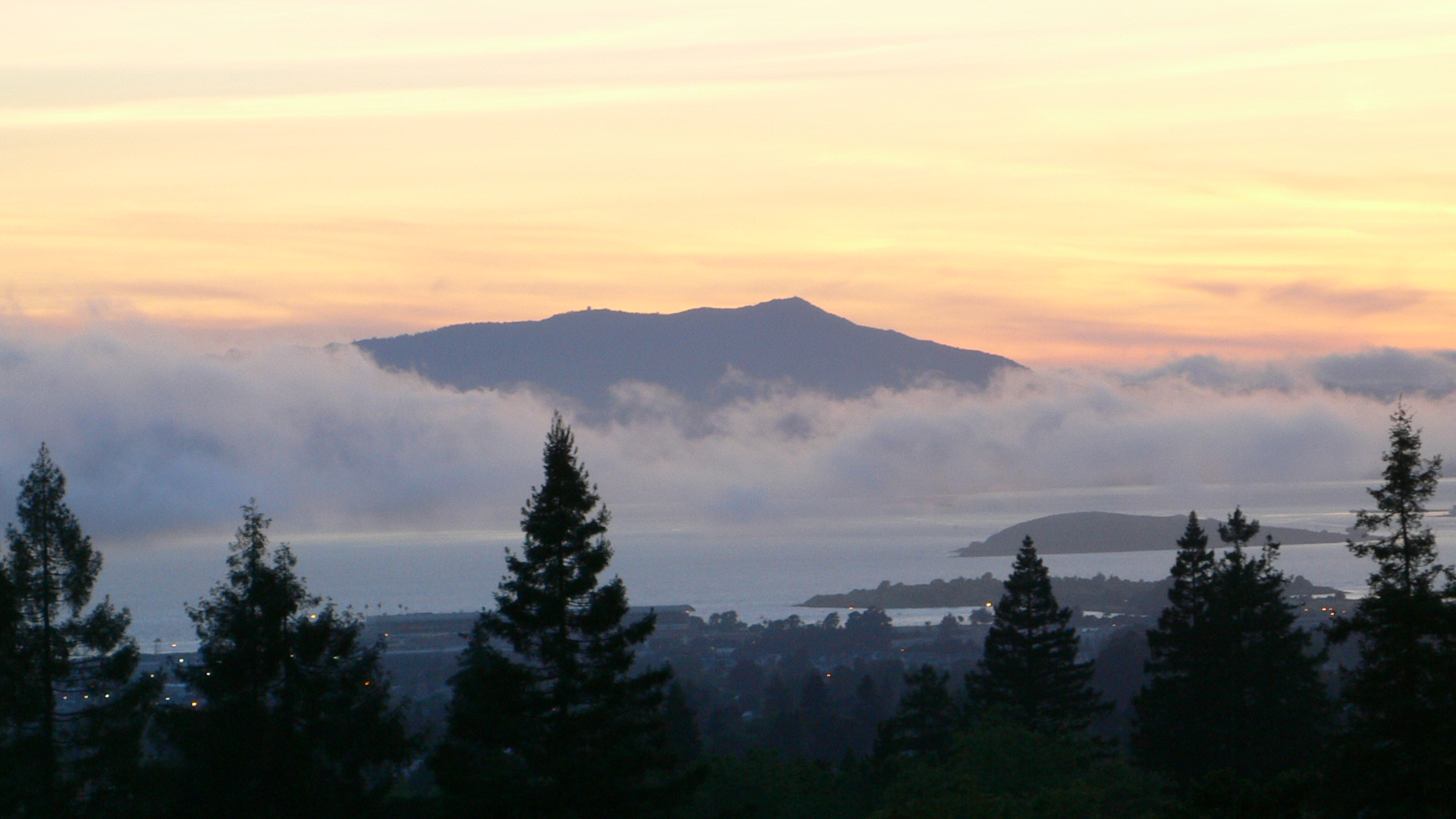
- Mount Tamalpais

Highest point
- Peak: Mount Tamalpais
- Elevation: 2,571 ft (784 m)
- Coordinates: 37°55′26.12″N 122°35′47.92″W

Geography
- Country: United States
- State: California

The Marin Hills are a series of steep high ridges and peaks in Marin County. They are an Outer California Coast Range component of the long Pacific Coast Ranges mountain system. The highest point of these hills is the 2,571-foot (784 m) Mount Tamalpais near Mill Valley.

== Geography ==
The hills are bordered to the north by the Petaluma River watershed and Sonoma County; to the east by San Pablo Bay, the northern arm of San Francisco Bay; to the south by the Golden Gate Strait; and to the west by the San Andreas Fault, running through Tomales Bay, Olema Valley, Bolinas Lagoon, and Stinson Beach. Parts of the hills are protected for their scenic beauty by Mount Tamalpais State Park and the Golden Gate National Recreation Area. The many ridges and peaks of these hills form a dramatic backdrop to the Golden Gate Bridge, the San Francisco skyline, and several towns around Richardson Bay when viewed from the south.

The Bay Area Ridge Trail roughly traces the north-south crest of the Marin Hills, running from the Marin Headlands north through Mount Tamalpais, White Hill, Loma Alta, Big Rock (at Lucas Valley Road), Big Rock Ridge and finally Burdell Mountain before ending at the Marin County-Sonoma County border. Big Rock Ridge at 1,887 feet (575 m) elevation is the second highest part of the Marin Hills crest after Mount Tamalpais.

Sir Francis Drake Boulevard bisects the Marin Hills from east to west, crossing the watershed divide at White Hill Pass, between White Hill to the south and Loma Alta to the north. It is the major road connecting west and east Marin County, and from White Hill Pass to the west it follows San Geronimo Creek to Lagunitas Creek to Point Reyes National Seashore, and to the east if follows Fairfax Creek to San Anselmo Creek to Corte Madera Creek to San Francisco Bay.

== Climate and Flora ==
Since these hills lie near the Pacific Ocean, they force much of the incoming moisture out of the air and rainfall here is much greater than the bayside of Marin County. Due to this orographic rain effect, the Marin Municipal Water District has constructed several dams and reservoirs to store water for the population of Marin. The high rainfall also makes these hills optimal habitat for coast redwood (Sequoia sempervirens) and Douglas-fir (Pseudotsuga menziesii var. menziesii) forests. Although east of the Marin Hills divide, where most of Marin's population lives, the climate is warmer and more arid, historically these lands supported coast redwoods. Historical accounts describe numerous sawmills and redwood forest which grew "near the water's edge" only 2 miles (3.2 km) from San Francisco Bay at Corte Madera. Today, however, the flora in eastern Marin County is predominantly California oak woodlands, chaparral and grasslands.

== Conservation and Fauna ==
The Marin Hills once had extensive old-growth coast redwood forests, but in the 1800s they were a source of timber for the San Francisco Bay Area, and thus logging took out most of the old-growth stands. However, one old-growth stand remained uncut in Redwood Canyon, due to the steep terrain and it therefore withstood pressure from loggers and water companies. This stand is now the Muir Woods National Monument, part of the Golden Gate National Recreation Area. The parklands of these hills are popular with tourists and locals alike seeking to escape the urban areas of the Bay Area.

The black-tailed deer (Odocoileus hemionus columbianus) is the most common large mammal of the Marin Hills. Other large mammal fauna include puma (Puma concolor) and recently black bears (Ursus americanus) have re-established a foothold. Marin County remains the only California county north of San Francisco Bay without beaver (Castor canadensis).
