= Larkspur Downtown Historic District =

Historic district in California, United States

- U.S. National Register of Historic Places
- U.S. Historic district
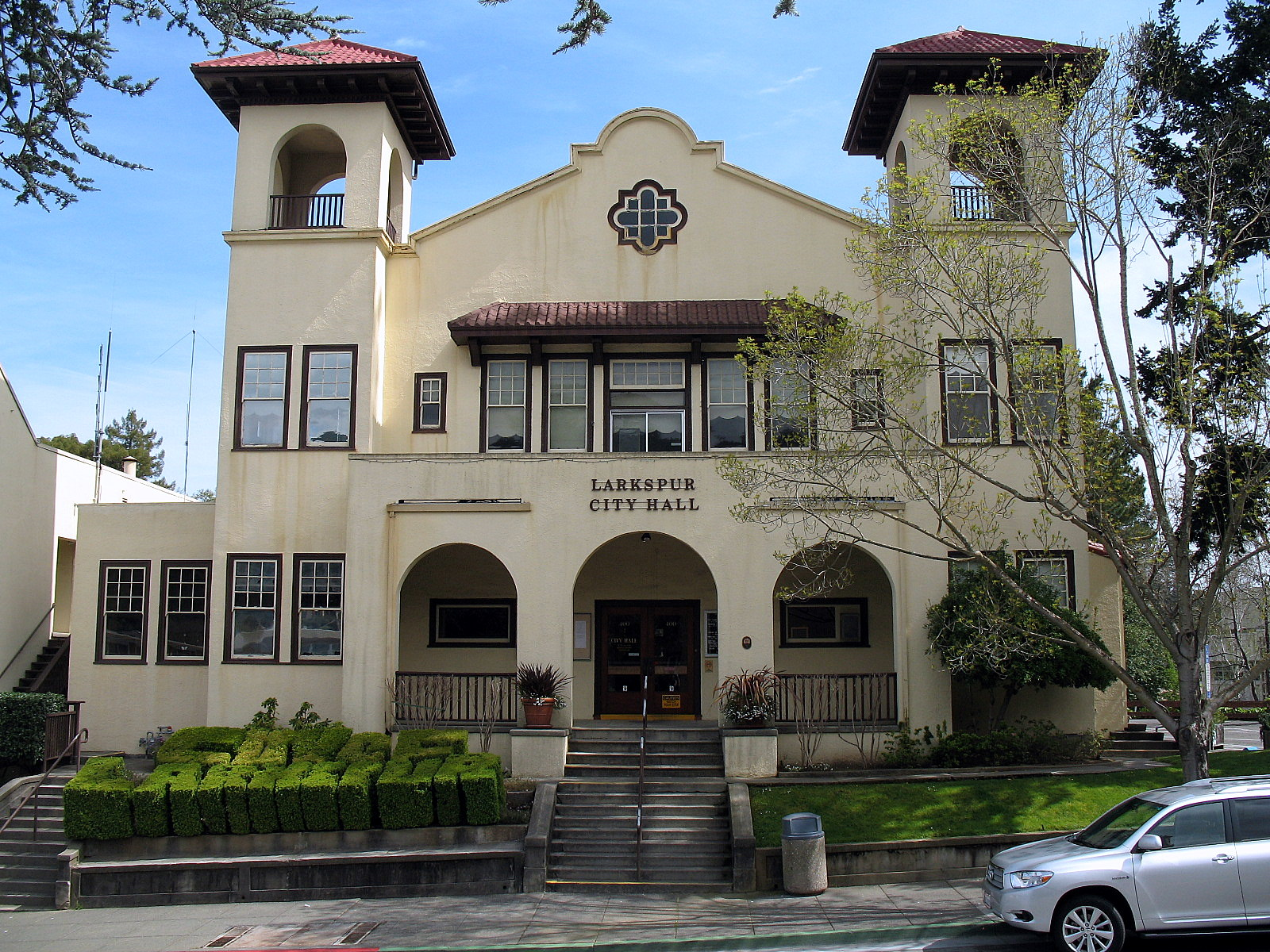
- Larkspur City Hall

- Location within California Location within the United States
- Location: 234–552½ Magnolia Ave., Larkspur, Marin County, California
- Coordinates: 37°56′5″N 122°32′2″W
- Architectural style: Mixed (more than two styles from different periods)
- NRHP reference No.: 82000972
- Added to NRHP: October 7, 1982

The Larkspur Downtown Historic District, known also as Old Downtown Larkspur, is a historic district along Magnolia Avenue in downtown Larkspur, Marin County, California.

The district covers the "Old Downtown" area, along Magnolia Avenue from the Lark Creek Inn at 234 Magnolia Avenue to the platform on the former railway, now a bicycle path. The avenue has been the commercial center of activity in Larkspur since the town was founded. In 1980, the Larkspur City Council designated it to be a local historic district and rezoned it as an overlay H Zone.

The historic district was listed on the National Register of Historic Places in 1982. It was asserted that the district is significant because it still has the ambiance of a small California town in the 1900–1930 era.

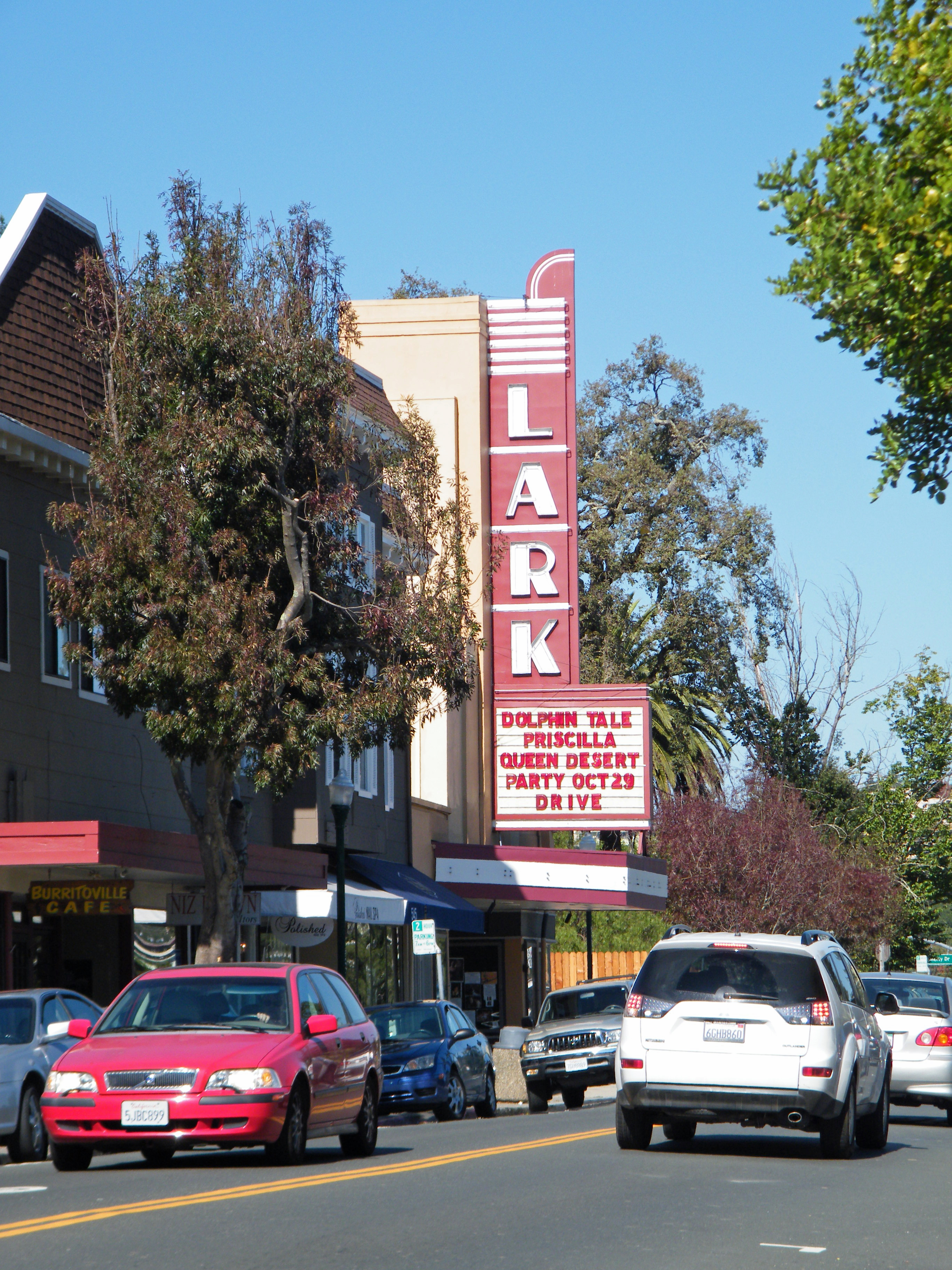
Lark Theater

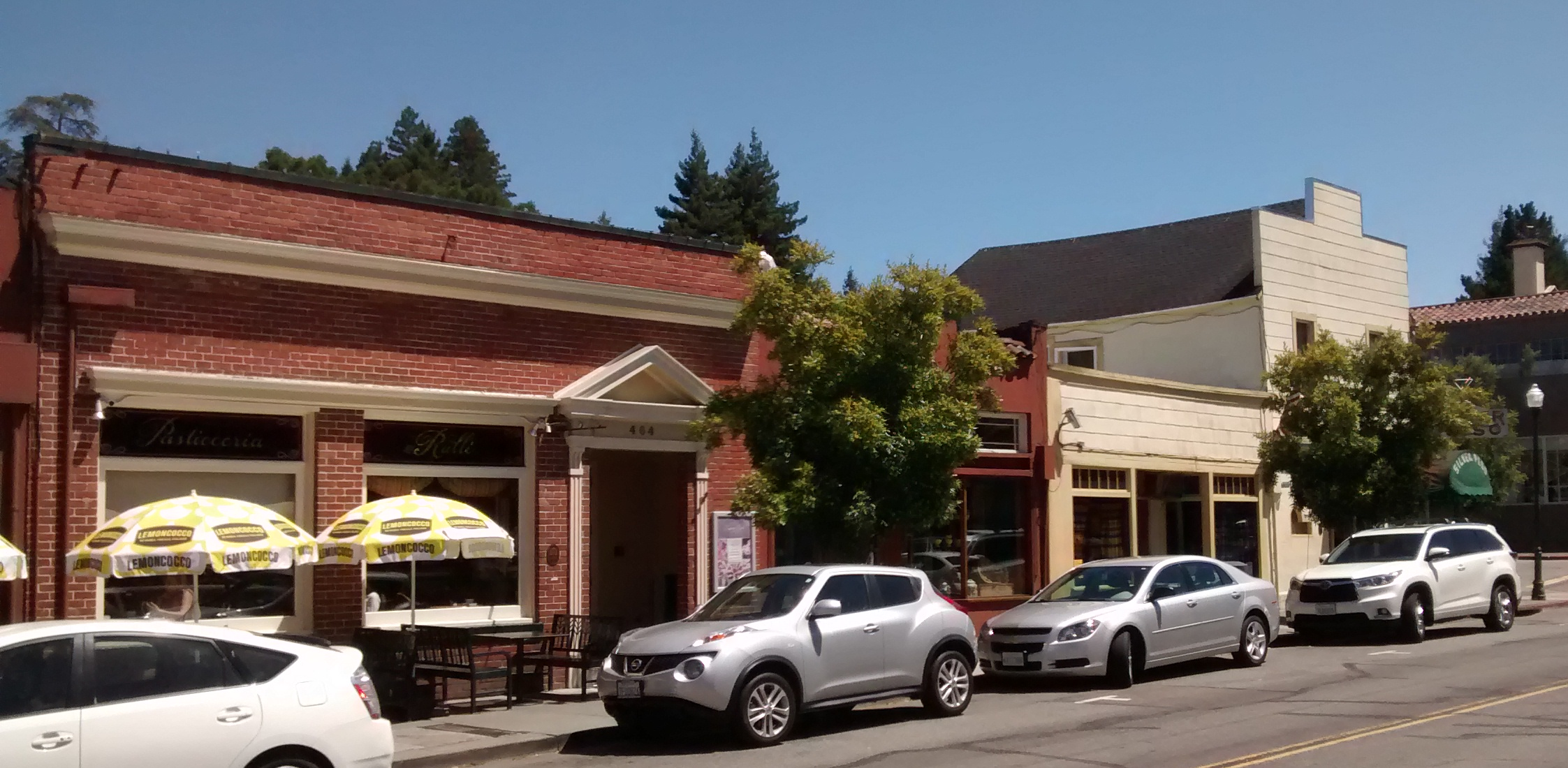
464 Magnolia and, on the right, the Silver Peso/Bob's Tavern

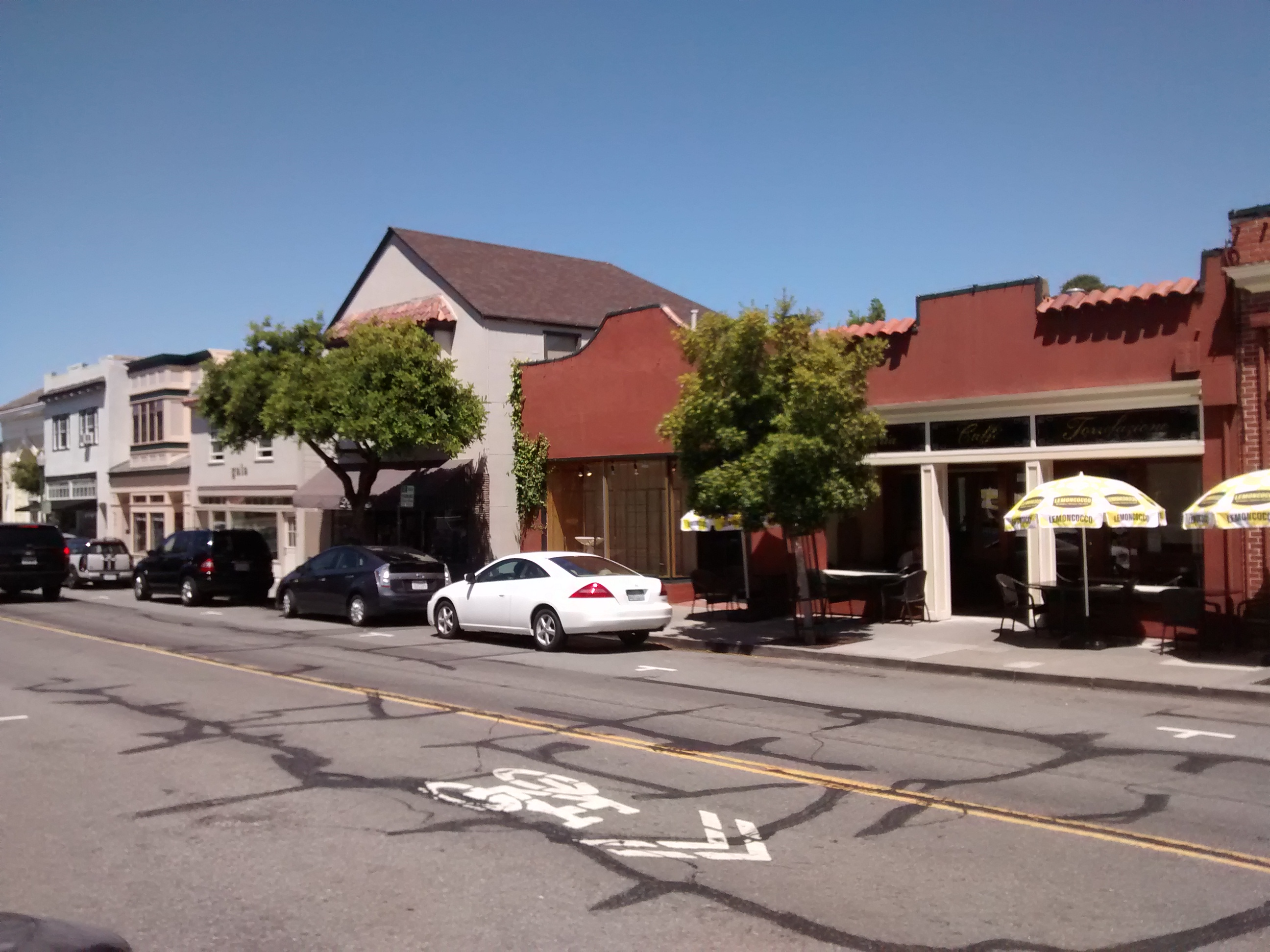
Elsewhere on Magnolia Ave.

Contributing properties include

- the Larkspur City Hall (map code #9)
- the Lark Theater (map code #39)
- Blue Rock Hotel
- a bank (map code #30)
- the Silver Peso/Bob's Tavern (map code #15),
- the barber shop (map code #25)
- railroad station (map code #40)
- railroad buildings (map code #41, 3–6)
- concrete railroad platform (map code #42)

== See also ==
- National Register of Historic Places listings in Marin County, California
