= San Anselmo Creek =

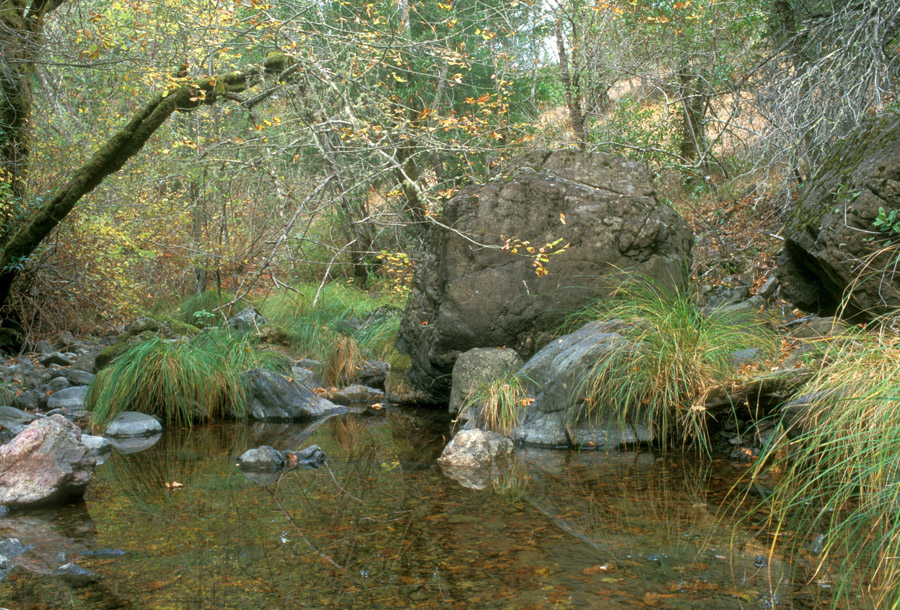
- Elliott Preserve, San Anselmo Creek in Fairfax, CA, courtesy Charles Kennard, Friends of Corte Madera Creek

Location
- Country: United States
- State: California
- Region: Marin County
- Cities: Ross, San Anselmo, Fairfax

Physical characteristics
- Source: Eastern flank of Pine Mountain, Marin Hills
  - coordinates: 37°58′56″N 122°38′33″W
  - elevation: 1,200 ft (370 m)
- Mouth: Corte Madera Creek (Marin County, California)
  - location: Ross, California
  - coordinates: 37°57′58″N 122°33′31″W
  - elevation: 36 ft (11 m)

Basin features
- Tributaries
  - left: Cascade Creek, Fairfax Creek, Sleepy Hollow Creek
  - right: Carey Camp Creek, Deer Park Creek

San Anselmo Creek is an eastward-flowing stream that begins on the eastern flank of Pine Mountain in the Marin Hills of Marin County, California. At its confluence with Ross Creek, it becomes Corte Madera Creek.

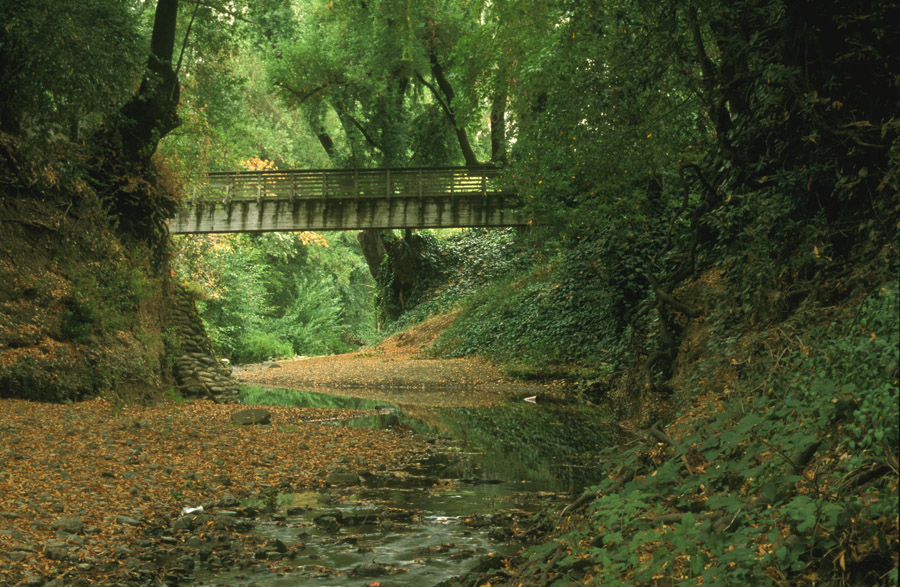
Sais Footbridge over San Anselmo Creek in the dry season of 1997, courtesy of Charles Kennard, Friends of Corte Madera Creek

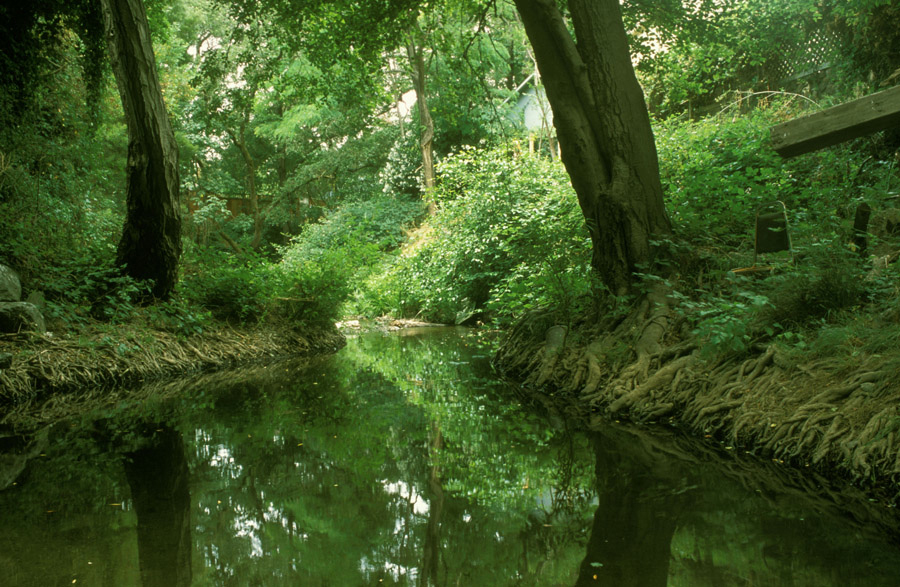
Massively woven alder roots on the bank of San Anselmo Creek, courtesy of Charles Kennard, Friends of Corte Madera Creek

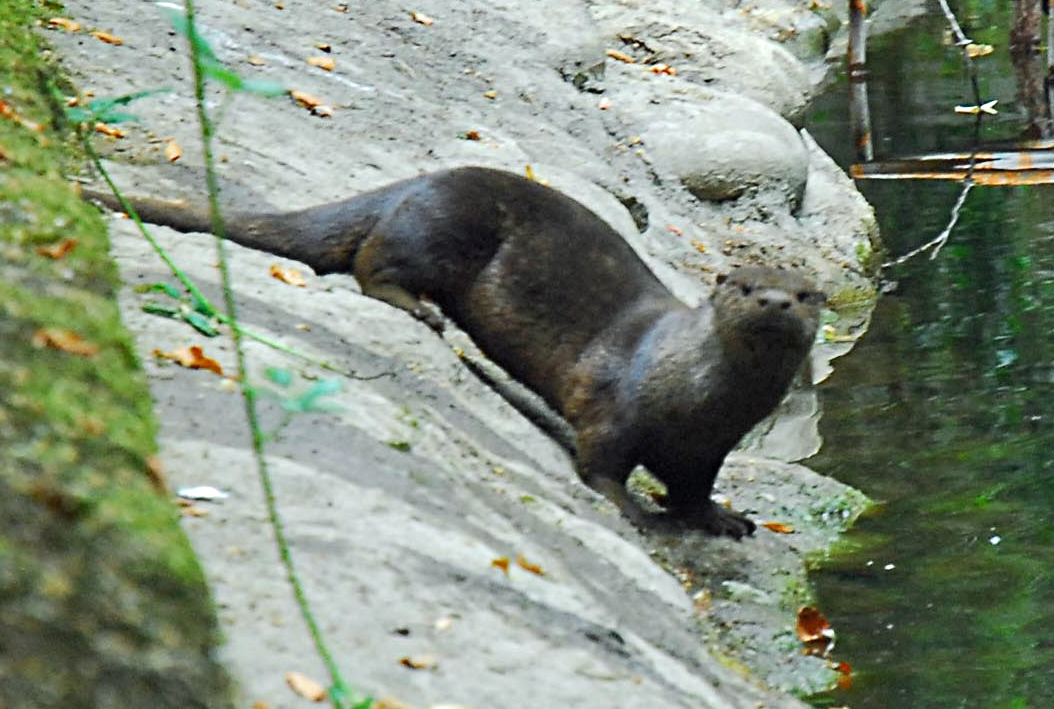
A river otter on the bank of San Anselmo Creek, July 2007, courtesy of Charles Kennard, Friends of Corte Madera Creek

== History ==
Its name came from the Punta de Quintin land grant, which marked the valley as the Canada del Anselmo, or Valley of Anselm, Anselm being the name of a native American who was baptized and later buried in the area. The Canada de Herrera, a 6,658-acre rancho that includes the areas that are now Fairfax, Sleepy Hollow, and part of San Anselmo, was granted to Domingo Sais in 1839. His family used the land for crops, sheep, horses, and cattle and fished San Anselmo Creek for salmon.

== Ecology ==
San Anselmo Creek, along with its Sleepy Hollow and Cascade creeks tributaries, is the principal steelhead trout (Oncorhynchus mykiss) contributor of the Corte Madera Creek watershed. Although short on water by late summer, Cascade Creek is considered to have the best trout habitat in the watershed. Rich electrofished five species of fish in San Anselmo Creek in 1999 of which rainbow/steelhead trout were the most abundant, followed by threespine stickleback, California roach, sculpin species, and Sacramento sucker.

Historically, Corte Madera Creek watershed supported coho salmon (Oncorhynchus kisutch) with observations recorded from 1926 to 1927, the 1960s, 1981, and the last sighting in 1984. While salmon were reported across the whole Corte Madera Creek watershed, Fry specifically observed coho in San Anselmo Creek in 1936. A spawning pair of Chinook salmon (Oncorhynchus tshawytscha) was observed by Michael Cronin just below Saunders Avenue in San Anselmo in 2003.

River otter (Lontra canadensis) were photographed on the creek in 2007 despite not being listed as native to Marin County in Grinnell's 1937 Fur-bearing Mammals of California.

== Watershed ==
Tributaries of San Anselmo Creek (from source to Corte Madera Creek) are Cascade Creek, Carey Camp Creek, Deer Park Creek, Fairfax Creek, Sleepy Hollow Creek and Ross Creek. In summer 2012 a partial fish passage barrier, the culvert beneath Center Boulevard in San Anselmo, is being modified with a fish ladder and concrete baffles, the latter to create resting places for migrating salmonids as they try to transit the high-velocity flows created by the concrete culvert.

== See also ==
- List of watercourses in the San Francisco Bay Area
