= Escalle, Larkspur, California =

Escalle
- Former unincorporated community District of Larkspur
- Location in California
- Coordinates: 37°56′36″N 122°32′42″W
- Country: United States
- State: California
- County: Marin County
- City: Larkspur

The Escalle region of (what is now) Larkspur, California takes its name from Jean Escalle, a 19th-century French immigrant and vintner whose name was given to many things in the area before it was incorporated into Larkspur, including the local railway station, and a vineyard, quarry, resort, and brickworks that he owned. The site of the buildings that remain from the original estate at (what is now) 771 Magnolia Avenue is a class H historic zone.

== Jean Escalle and the development of the settlement ==
With his brother Pierre, Jean Escalle immigrated to Larkspur in 1881 from France, to join his friend and fellow French immigrant Claude Callot in operating a brickworks. Callot had been operating the brickworks since 1874, having leased it from a Patrick King that year and then outright bought it in 1879; and in the year of the arrival of the Escalles they together built a house, a barn, a water-tank, and a winery on Callot's property, which was on the lower slopes of Little King Mountain. Escalle married Callot's widow Ellen after Callott's death in 1888, expanding from running the brickworks into also running an inn, named the Limerick Inn and opened in 1894 next to the house. There he sold wine from grapes grown in a 23 acres (9.3 hectares) vineyard expanded from the original, which by that time was producing 20,000 US gallons (760 hL) of wine per year. Escalle ran a weekly wine delivery service.

The Limerick Inn was a part of the area becoming a resort, with its bocce ball court and gardens; to which customers would travel by railway or horse-drawn vehicle. The Escalle annual celebration of Bastille Day became a popular attraction, as well. The local railway station came to be known as Escalle. The area bordered on an ark community that grew at around the same time, Boardwalks #1, #2, and #3; and one 1892 photograph (now in the William Frizzi collection at the Marin History Museum) records members of the ark community fetching water from Escalle's water tank and the wine delivery driver August "Gus" Frizzi (husband of baker Julia Frizzi, whose bakery stood at what is now 499 Magnolia Avenue, and later saloon owner) setting out to make a delivery in a horse and buggy.

Because of Prohibition, the inn ceased selling wine in 1920. Escalle also died that year, causing legal complications to ensue from his relatives in France that effectively left the entire estate in limbo for the next two decades. Adolph A. Tiscornia, an attorney and investor who acquired a significant fraction of Larkspur over the years, eventually bought Escalle in 1941, after the legal complications were finally resolved, and in 1978 Escalle Village was built.

== Current status ==
In the 21st century, the original estate buildings still remain, most of Tiscornia's other properties having been sold by Tiscornia's granddaughter and heir Mary, including the barn, the water tank, and the winery, which retains its original Italianate false front with "Escalle's" and "1888" on the upper storey and its original brick lower floor and wood upper floor. The additional signage "Corte Madera Vineyard and Winery" that existed in Escalle's lifetime (after Corte Madera as this was before incorporation into Larkspur) is, however, no longer present, and various additions have been made to the winery that are not visible from the front; as well as a two-car garage added, built into the slope of the hill. The Limerick Inn was damaged in 1982 by a landslip, and is now mainly a shell albeit one that was stabilized after being threatened by the nearby growth of elm trees in 2003 and redecorated in 2008 for a Centennial celebration.
