= Lark Theater =

- U.S. Historic district – Contributing property
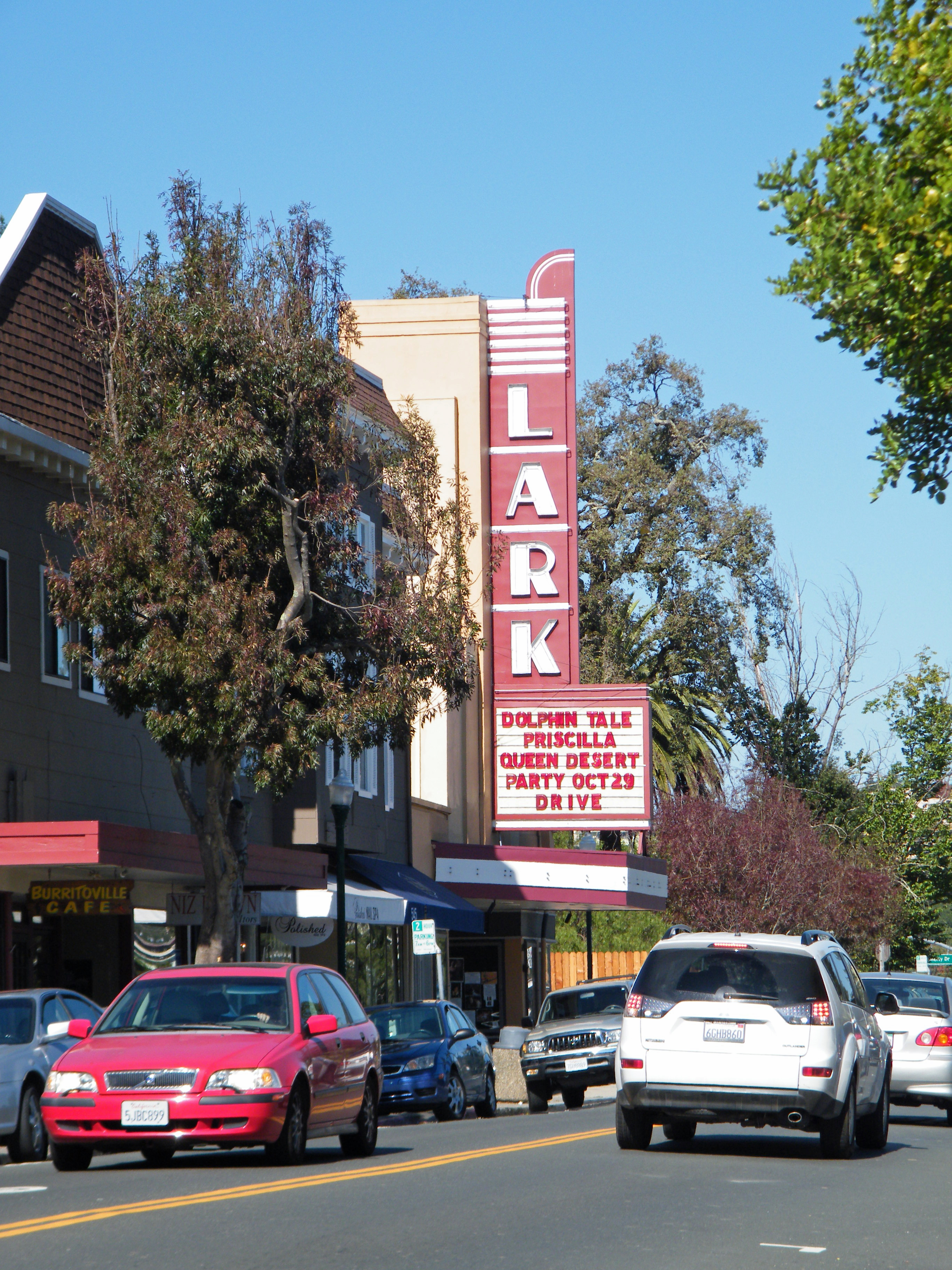
- Lark Theater, 2011

- Location within California Location within the United States
- Location: Magnolia Ave., Larkspur, California
- Coordinates: 37°56′5″N 122°32′2″W
- Architect: William B. David
- Architectural style: Art Deco
- Part of: Larkspur Downtown Historic District (ID82000972)
- Added to NRHP: October 7, 1982

The Lark Theater is a single-screen Art Deco cinema in Larkspur, California, United States.

== History ==
The Lark Theater was built by the Blumenfeld family in 1936, over a horse-shoe pit. It anchors the North End of Larkspur's historic downtown district, and is designated a Larkspur Heritage Building. It is a contributing structure in the Larkspur Downtown Historic District, which is listed on the National Register of Historic Places.

The Lark was designed by architect William B. David, who began his career in the firm of S. Charles Lee and went on to design many Northern California cinemas of the period, including the Lark's sister theaters the Park, in Lafayette, California, and the Noyo in Willits, California. It may not be a coincidence that all three structures used four-letter names that fit neatly above the marquee.

The theater is Larkspur's only Art Deco building. It originally seated 400 people and featured both heating and air conditioning at the time it opened. Its neon sign and stopped tower are typical details used for 1930s movie theaters. The two small buildings on either side of the theater were originally used as office and storage space for the theater.

== Closure and renovation ==
Over the decades of its existence, the Lark has been a first-run movie theater and an art-house venue. But by the late 1990s, the building was empty and in disrepair. The theater had been dark for five years, and was slated for demolition in 2003, when local residents mounted a campaign to "Save the Lark." Sufficient funds were raised to restore the theater's interior and exterior, and to do so with environmentally safe materials. Local professionals donated services and volunteers, led by co-founder and Executive Director Bernice Baeza, worked to restore the Lark to its original splendor. For these efforts, the Lark Theater was awarded the 2005 Art Deco Preservation Award from the California Art Deco Society and certified as a green business by the County of Marin. Later, a successful capital campaign made it possible for the non-profit Lark Theater LLC to purchase the building.

On July 9, 2004, the Lark Theater re-opened as an independent, non-profit community film and culture center with a screening of the 1949 film noir classic Impact, which was partially shot in Larkspur. The seating capacity was reduced to 205 seats (down from 400). Since that time, the Lark has offered cultural programming which includes first-run, independent and classic film, an annual Youth Film Festival, live broadcasts of events of civic interest such as the Presidential debates and inauguration, fundraisers for local schools and non-profits, panel discussions and live music.

In November, 2012, the theater installed a new 4K NEC digital projector for its single screen. The sound system was upgraded to handle 7.1 media.

The theater also has two Meyers powered speakers, one subwoofer, a 16 channel audio mixing board, audio effects processors and stage lighting for live performances on the small stage.
