= Larkspur Creek =

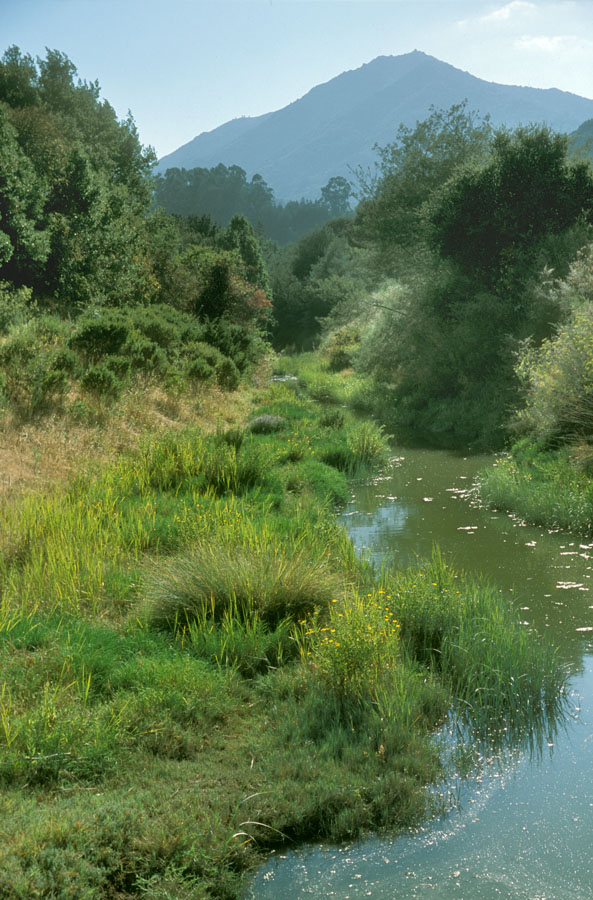
- Tidal portion of Larkspur Creek near confluence with Corte Madera Creek and with Mount Tamalpais in west background. Courtesy of Charles Kennard, Friends of Corte Madera Creek.
- Native name: Arroyo Holon (Spanish)

Location
- Country: United States
- State: California
- Region: Marin County
- City: Larkspur, California

Physical characteristics
- Source
  - location: Knob Hill, Marin County, California
  - coordinates: 37°56′10″N 122°33′48″W
  - elevation: 880 ft (270 m)
- Mouth: San Francisco Bay
  - location: Corte Madera, California
  - coordinates: 37°56′10″N 122°33′48″W
  - elevation: 7 ft (2.1 m)

Basin features
- Tributaries
  - right: Larkspur Creek

Larkspur Creek is a short stream which flows 3.5 miles east to meet Corte Madera Creek in Larkspur, California just before reaching Richardson's Bay. The creek was named for the town of Larkspur, which was named by Georgiana Wright, a Briton and spouse of the 1887 developer of the area. She named the town of Larkspur for lupine flowers on the hills that she mistook for larkspur.

== History ==
John Reed received the Rancho Corte Madera del Presidio land grant in 1834 which extended from Point Tiburon to Larkspur Creek. Secretary Daniel Taylor of the Baltimore and Frederick Trading and Mining Company recalled in a 1914 newspaper article, "When we arrived at Larkspur, there was no one to meet us. The country was a wilderness, with wild geese in abundance." Baltimore Canyon (the Larkspur Creek subwatershed) was named for the timber sawmill the company had transported to Larkspur from Baltimore, Maryland by sailboat around Cape Horn in 1849. The sawyers denuded Mount Tamalpais of old-growth redwoods in short order. Said Taylor in 1914, "I can picture the majestic redwoods that covered the flat where Larkspur stands today. Some of the trees were eight feet in diameter and lifted their immense bulk 300 feet upward." This newspaper account also described the hunting of a 375- pound black bear (Ursus americanus): "He was beautiful and the boys had the feast of their lives for a week on bear meat."

By the early 1860s, the forest had been clear-cut and only vestiges remained. Commented Judge Samuel Gardiner, who lived adjacent to the mouth of the canyon in the early 1900s, "One thing that is not appreciated today is the character of the redwood growth that existed here. There were thousands of redwood stumps ranging from five to 15 feet in diameter at the point of cutting...thousands of them." At the area now known as Dolliver Park, Judge Gardiner reported that the creek "was about nine feet across and about 25 feet deep" (where now it is but two feet deep in summer). Judge Gardiner mentioned night herons (Nycticorax nycticorax) in the early 1900s: " I remember well there was a large colony of night herons which nested in the redwood tops of the Baltimore Canyon and nightly flew to the marsh area to hunt for shell fish. They stayed all night and came back at dawn."

== Ecology and conservation ==
Steelhead trout (Oncorhynchus mykiss) were collected from Larkspur Creek in 1981.

Baltimore Canyon Open Space Preserve protects the upper watershed, where perennial pools harbor young steelhead and Pacific giant salamanders (Dicamptodontidae). At the head of the canyon lies Dawn Falls, a spectacular 30-foot cascade during the wet winter months through early spring.

== See also ==
- List of watercourses in the San Francisco Bay Area
