= Larkspur, California =

City in California, United States

- City
- City of Larkspur
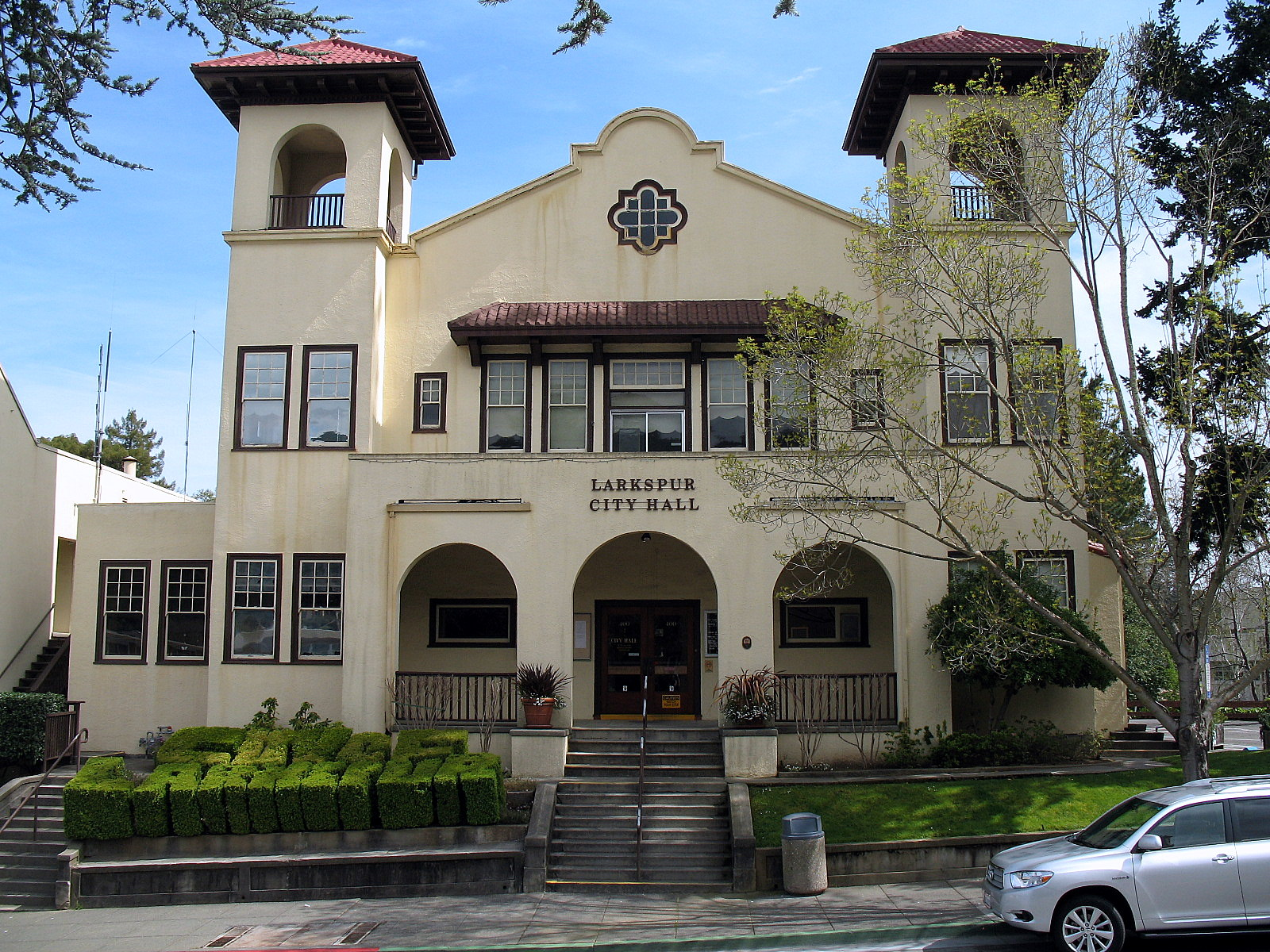
- Larkspur City Hall in 2010

- Seal
- Interactive map of Larkspur, California
- Location in the United States
- Coordinates: 37°56′03″N 122°32′07″W
- Country: United States
- State: California
- County: Marin
- Incorporated: March 1, 1908

Government
  - County Board: Brian Colbert (District 2); Dennis Rodoni (District 4)
  - Mayor: Catherine Way
  - City Manager: Dan Schwarz
  - State Leg.: Sen. Mike McGuire (D); Asm. Damon Connolly (D)
  - U. S. Congress: Jared Huffman (D)

Area
  - Total: 3.22 sq mi (8.33 km^{2})
  - Land: 3.00 sq mi (7.77 km^{2})
  - Water: 0.22 sq mi (0.57 km^{2}) 6.80%
- Elevation: 43 ft (13 m)

Population (2020)
  - Total: 13,064
  - Estimate (2025): 12,620
  - Density: 4,350/sq mi (1,680/km^{2})
- Time zone: UTC−08:00 (PST)
  - Summer (DST): UTC−07:00 (PDT)
- ZIP Code: 94939
- Area codes: 415/628
- FIPS code: 06-40438
- GNIS feature IDs: 1658942, 2411627
- Website: www.larkspur.ca.gov

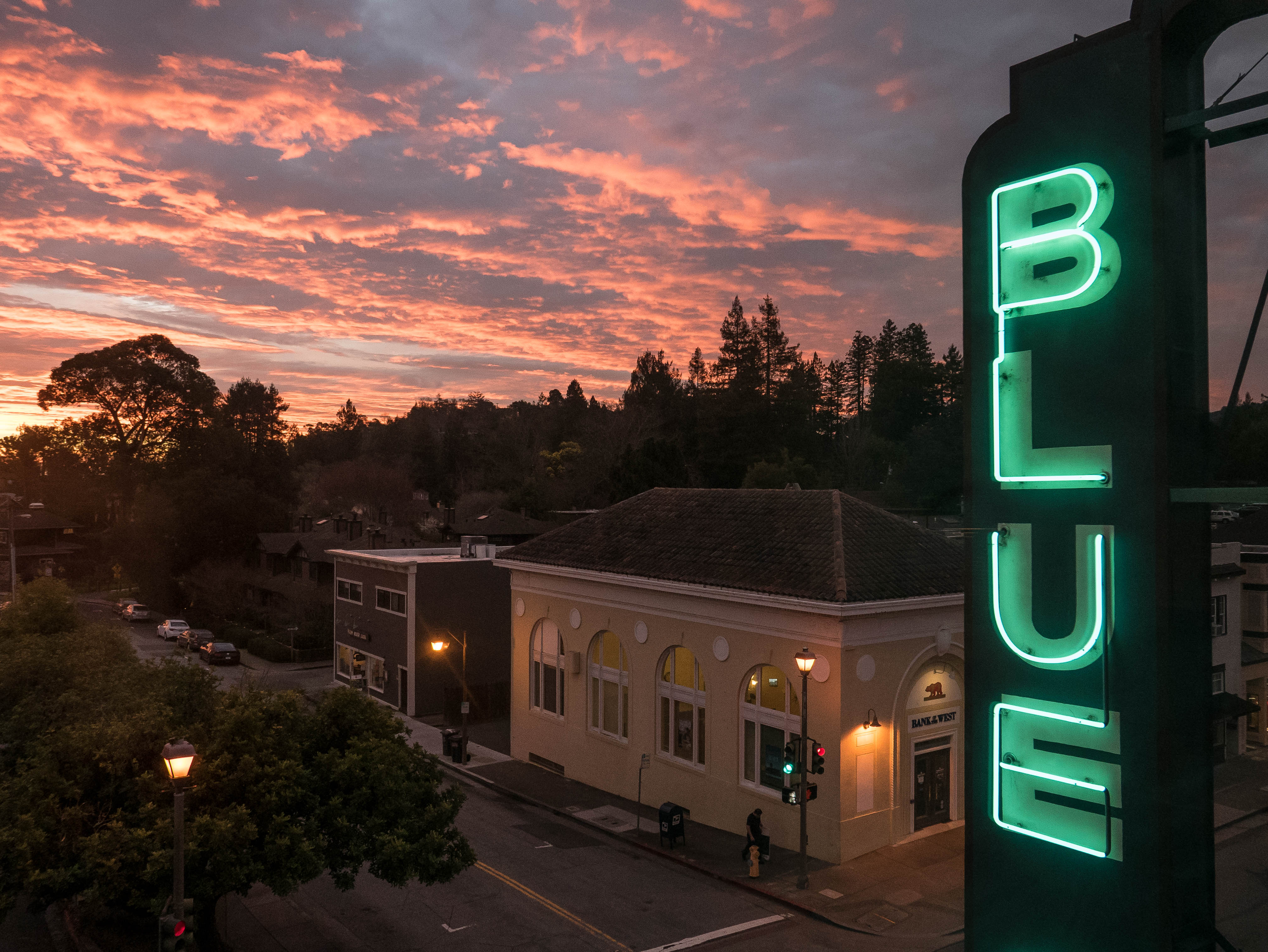
View of Larkspur at sunrise as seen from the Blue Rock Inn, formerly Hotel Merwin built in 1895

Larkspur is a city in Marin County, California, United States. Larkspur is located directly south of Kentfield and 3 miles (4.8 km) south of San Rafael, at an elevation of 43 feet (13 m). As of the 2020 census, the city's population was 13,064. Larkspur's Police Department is shared with that of the neighboring Corte Madera and town of San Anselmo as the Central Marin Police Authority.

The city's main thoroughfare is Magnolia Avenue, which runs through the Larkspur Downtown Historic District. Madrone Canyon, a residential area amidst a redwood grove, traces scenic Larkspur Creek.

== Geography ==
According to the United States Census Bureau, the city has a total area of 3.22 sq mi (8.3 km^{2}), of which 3.00 sq mi (7.8 km^{2}) is land and 0.22 sq mi (0.6 km^{2}) (6.80%) is water.

== History ==
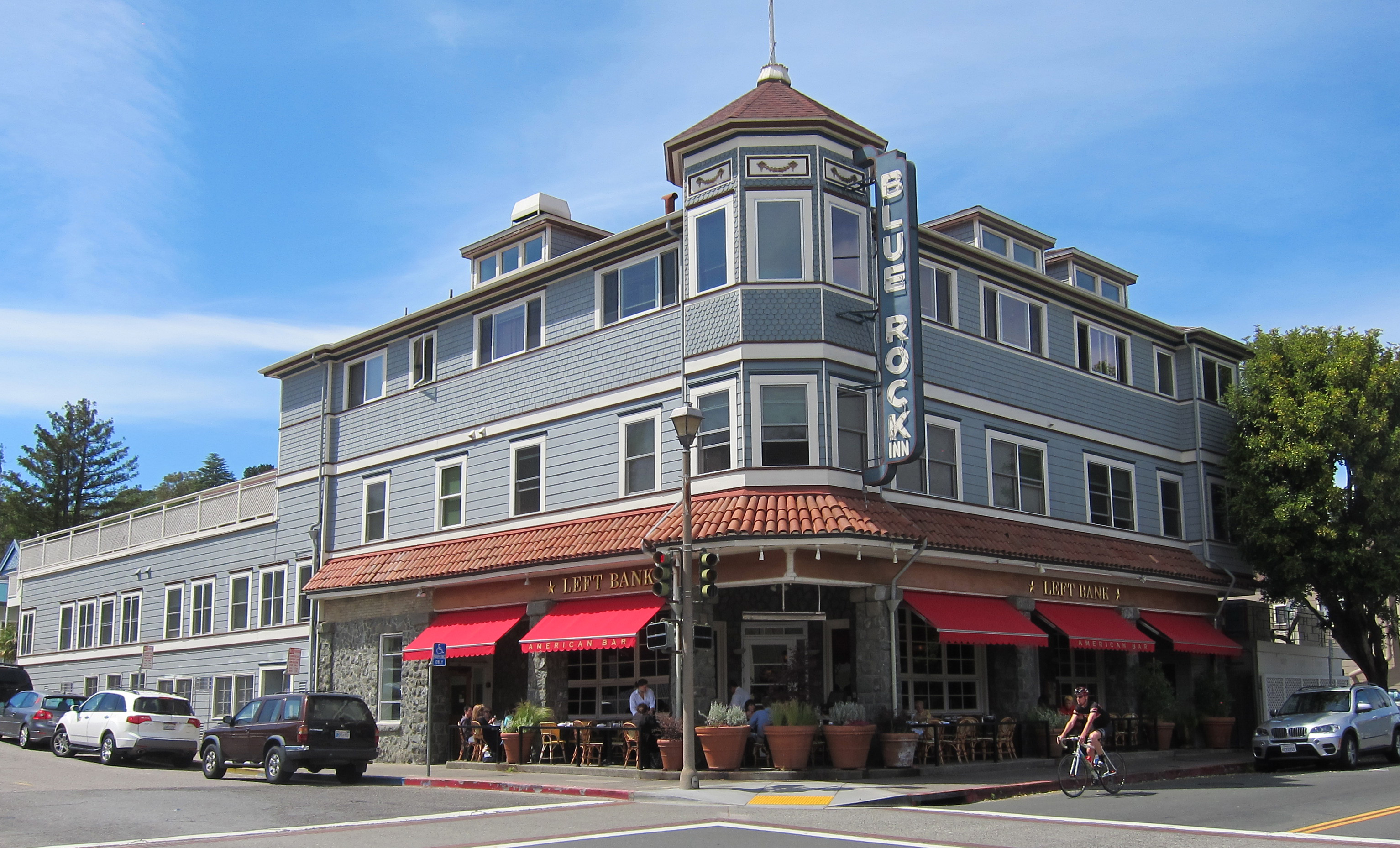
The former Blue Rock Inn

Charles W. Wright laid out the town in 1887. The first post office opened in 1891. Larkspur incorporated in 1908. Larkspur's Downtown Historic District, known also as Old Downtown Larkspur, is a historic district that was listed on the National Register of Historic Places in 1982. The restored Art Deco Lark Theater is part of this downtown district. The historic Blue Rock building, originally opened in the 1890's, is currently home to popular restaurant The Left Bank.

== Communities ==
Murray Park is an unincorporated community in Larkspur. Escalle is named after a 19th-century French immigrant. Parts of Greenbrae are within the city limits of Larkspur, while other parts of Greenbrae are unincorporated.

== Government ==
=== Federal and state ===
In the United States House of Representatives, Larkspur is in California's 2nd congressional district, represented by Democrat Jared Huffman. From 2008 to 2012, Huffman represented Marin County in the California State Assembly.

In the California State Legislature, Larkspur is in:

- the 12th Assembly district, represented by Democrat Damon Connolly
- the 2nd senatorial district, represented by Democrat Mike McGuire.

According to the California Secretary of State, as of February 10, 2019, Larkspur has 8,871 registered voters. Of those, 4,944 (55.7%) are registered Democrats, 1,250 (14.1%) are registered Republicans, and 2,324 (26.2%) have declined to state a political party.

== Demographics ==
Historical population
Census	Pop.	Note	%±
1910	594		—
1920	612		3.0%
1930	1,241		102.8%
1940	1,558		25.5%
1950	2,905		86.5%
1960	5,710		96.6%
1970	10,487		83.7%
1980	11,064		5.5%
1990	11,070		0.1%
2000	12,014		8.5%
2010	11,926		−0.7%
2020	13,064		9.5%
2025 (est.)	12,620	▼	−3.4%
U.S. Decennial Census; 1860–1870 1880-1890; 1900 1910 1920; 1930 1940 1950; 1960 1970 1980; 1990 2000 2010; 2020

=== 2020 census ===
As of the 2020 census, Larkspur had a population of 13,064 and a population density of 4,356.1 inhabitants per square mile (1,681.9/km^{2}). The age distribution was 18.2% under the age of 18, 5.5% aged 18 to 24, 20.1% aged 25 to 44, 30.4% aged 45 to 64, and 25.8% who were 65 years of age or older. The median age was 49.2 years. For every 100 females there were 85.9 males, and for every 100 females age 18 and over there were 82.5 males age 18 and over.

The census reported that 99.3% of the population lived in households, 0.1% lived in non-institutionalized group quarters, and 0.7% were institutionalized. There were 6,102 households, out of which 24.5% included children under the age of 18, 42.6% were married-couple households, 7.0% were cohabiting couple households, 33.4% had a female householder with no partner present, and 17.0% had a male householder with no partner present. 36.8% of households were one person, and 20.3% were one person aged 65 or older. The average household size was 2.13. There were 3,347 families (54.9% of all households).

There were 6,459 housing units at an average density of 2,153.7 units per square mile (831.5 units/km^{2}), of which 6,102 (94.5%) were occupied. Of these, 48.6% were owner-occupied and 51.4% were occupied by renters. Overall, 5.5% of housing units were vacant. The homeowner vacancy rate was 0.5%, and the rental vacancy rate was 5.2%.

100.0% of residents lived in urban areas, while 0.0% lived in rural areas.

Racial composition as of the 2020 census
Race	Number	Percent
White	9,848	75.4%
Black or African American	193	1.5%
American Indian and Alaska Native	78	0.6%
Asian	820	6.3%
Native Hawaiian and Other Pacific Islander	15	0.1%
Some other race	686	5.3%
Two or more races	1,424	10.9%
Hispanic or Latino (of any race)	1,450	11.1%

=== 2023 ACS 5-year estimates ===
In 2023, the US Census Bureau estimated that 16.9% of the population were foreign-born. Of all people aged 5 or older, 80.6% spoke only English at home, 8.7% spoke Spanish, 6.6% spoke other Indo-European languages, 3.0% spoke Asian or Pacific Islander languages, and 1.1% spoke other languages. Of those aged 25 or older, 96.6% were high school graduates and 69.4% had a bachelor's degree.

The median household income in 2023 was $134,744, and the per capita income was $103,235. About 3.4% of families and 7.1% of the population were below the poverty line.

=== 2010 census ===
At the 2010 census Larkspur had a population of 11,926. The population density was 3,677.5 inhabitants per square mile (1,419.9/km^{2}). The racial makeup of Larkspur was 10,311 (86.5%) White, 186 (1.6%) African American, 26 (0.2%) Native American, 563 (4.7%) Asian, 13 (0.1%) Pacific Islander, 343 (2.9%) from other races, and 484 (4.1%) from two or more races. Hispanic or Latino of any race were 918 people (7.7%).

The census reported that 11,803 people (99.0% of the population) lived in households, 42 (0.4%) lived in non-institutionalized group quarters, and 81 (0.7%) were institutionalized.

There were 5,908 households, 1,314 (22.2%) had children under the age of 18 living in them, 2,266 (38.4%) were opposite-sex married couples living together, 433 (7.3%) had a female householder with no husband present, 197 (3.3%) had a male householder with no wife present. There were 329 (5.6%) unmarried opposite-sex partnerships, and 74 (1.3%) same-sex married couples or partnerships. 2,502 households (42.3%) were one person and 1,009 (17.1%) had someone living alone who was 65 or older. The average household size was 2.00. There were 2,896 families (49.0% of households); the average family size was 2.77.

The age distribution was 2,176 people (18.2%) under the age of 18, 466 people (3.9%) aged 18 to 24, 2,620 people (22.0%) aged 25 to 44, 4,103 people (34.4%) aged 45 to 64, and 2,561 people (21.5%) who were 65 or older. The median age was 48.5 years. For every 100 females, there were 81.9 males. For every 100 females age 18 and over, there were 78.0 males.

There were 6,376 housing units at an average density of 1,966.1 per square mile, of the occupied units 2,898 (49.1%) were owner-occupied and 3,010 (50.9%) were rented. The homeowner vacancy rate was 1.5%; the rental vacancy rate was 7.1%. 6,494 people (54.5% of the population) lived in owner-occupied housing units and 5,309 people (44.5%) lived in rental housing units.

== Transportation ==
=== Ferry service ===
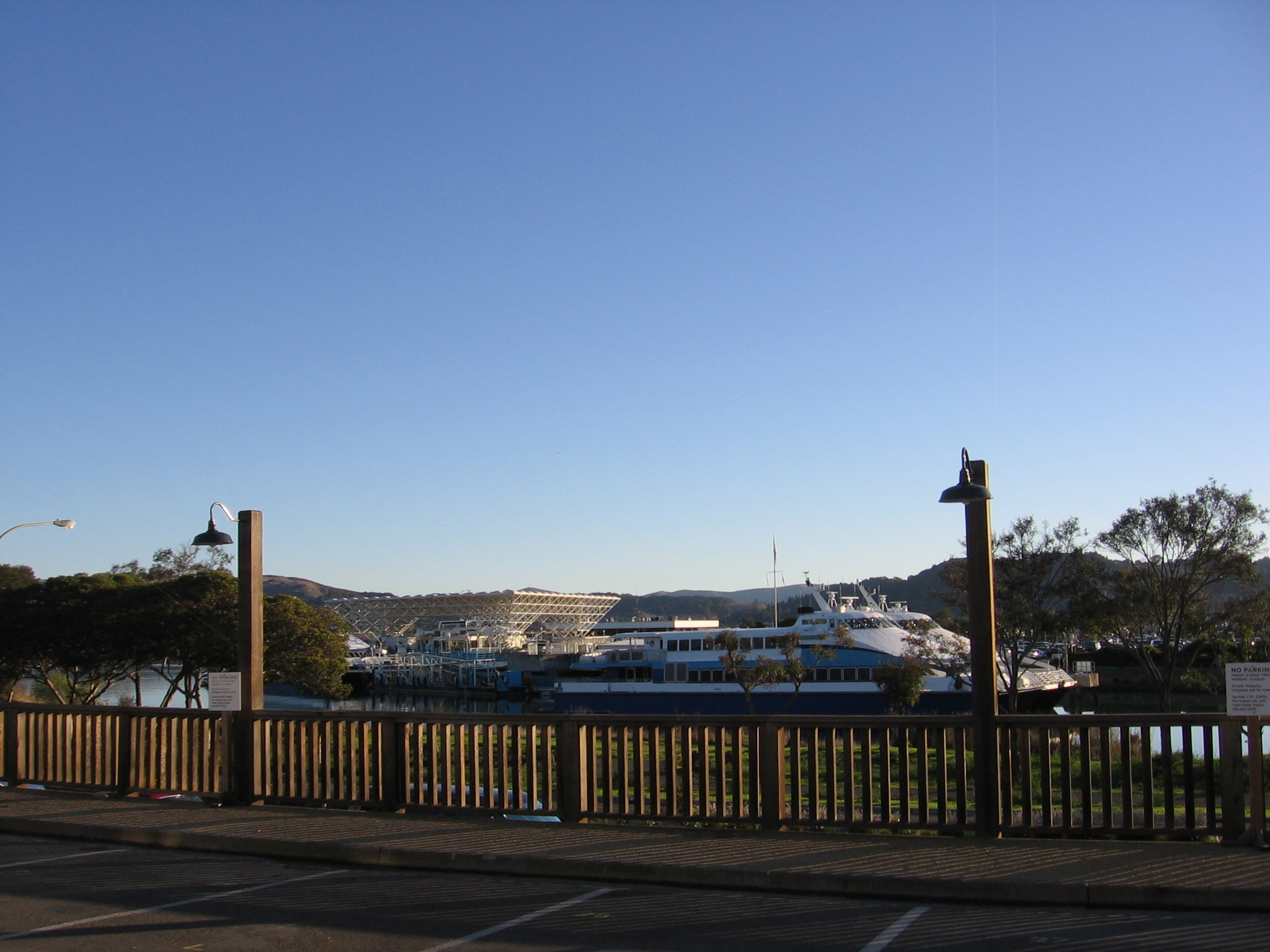
Ferries docked at the Larkspur Landing in Larkspur, California.

Larkspur is the location of Golden Gate Transit's Larkspur Landing, the main ferry terminal for its commuter passenger ferry service between Marin County and the San Francisco Ferry Building and job centers in the Financial District. This Golden Gate Ferry portals and has a ridership of over 8,500 per day, on average. There is special direct ferry service from the Larkspur Ferry Terminal to Oracle Park for San Francisco Giants games.

=== Rail service ===
The Sonoma–Marin Area Rail Transit commuter rail service was extended to Larkspur station in 2019. The line provides daily trips as far north as Charles M. Schulz–Sonoma County Airport and is eventually planned to extend to Cloverdale station.

The North Pacific Coast Railroad (later absorbed by the Northwestern Pacific Railroad) provided interurban services to Larkspur until 1941.

== Education ==
Larkspur-Corte Madera School District serves much of Larkspur for elementary and middle school. Neil Cummins Elementary School and Hall Middle School serve both Corte Madera and Larkspur. Neil Cummins serves grades K to 5, while Hall serves grades 6 to 8. The former San Clemente Elementary School was reopened as The Cove School in 2014. In lieu of extensive retrofit to the existing structures, new buildings have been built on the same site. This school serves neighborhoods currently served by Neil Cummins Elementary, mostly to the west of Highway 101, and new developments in the area.

A portion of Larkspur is in the Kentfield Elementary School District.

The Tamalpais Union High School District, which serves most of Larkspur (the Larkspur-Corte Madera and Kentfield district portions), comprises five high schools that serve the region.

A portion of Larkspur is in the San Rafael Elementary School District and the San Rafael High School District, jointly operated as San Rafael City Schools. Residents of the San Rafael high school district may choose either San Rafael High School or Terra Linda High School.

Marin Primary and Middle School and St. Patrick's are local private schools.

The College of Marin is a public community college in Marin County with two campuses, one in Kentfield. The Kentfield campus is adjacent to the Larkspur town limit. Operational since 1926, it is the only institution operated by the Marin Community College District.

== In popular culture ==
Scenes in the 1949 film noir Impact featured several areas around Larkspur, including the home and gas station of the Probert family, in the location now occupied by Perry's Larkspur restaurant. In the film, the town is frequently mentioned as being in Idaho.

The final scenes of Clint Eastwood's 1971 movie Dirty Harry were filmed in Larkspur at the old Hutchison Gravel Quarry (now Larkspur Landing). The final scene in the 1972 season 1 episode 12 of The Waltons titled “The Dust Bowl Cousins” Mary-Ellen tells John-Boy that her pen landed on Larkspur, CA in her geography book and how that would be a wonderful place to see someday.

== Town twinning ==
- (United States) Corte Madera, California ("twin city")
- Shangyu, Zhejiang, China (sister city)

== Notable people ==
- Jake Curhan (born 1998), American football offensive tackle for the Seattle Seahawks of the National Football League (NFL)
- Matt Doyle, Broadway actor.
- Leonard Gardner, author of the novel Fat City, lives in Larkspur.
- Erin Gray, television actress.
- Janis Joplin's last known residence was located in Larkspur at 380 West Baltimore Avenue.
- Jerry Garcia and Robert Hunter lived together in a house in Madrone Canyon.
- Charles S. Kilburn, U.S. Army brigadier general
- Ki Longfellow grew up in Larkspur's Madrone Canyon: 201 Madrone Avenue, (The Illustrated Vivian Stanshall, a Fairytale of Grimm Art, Eio Books, 2018)
- Gavin Newsom, California Governor, lived in Larkspur in his youth.
- Steve Perry, former lead singer of rock band Journey.
- Michael Savage, conservative broadcaster.
- Leon Uris wrote his acclaimed first novel, Battle Cry (1953), in Larkspur.
- Corinne West, singer/songwriter.

== Gallery ==
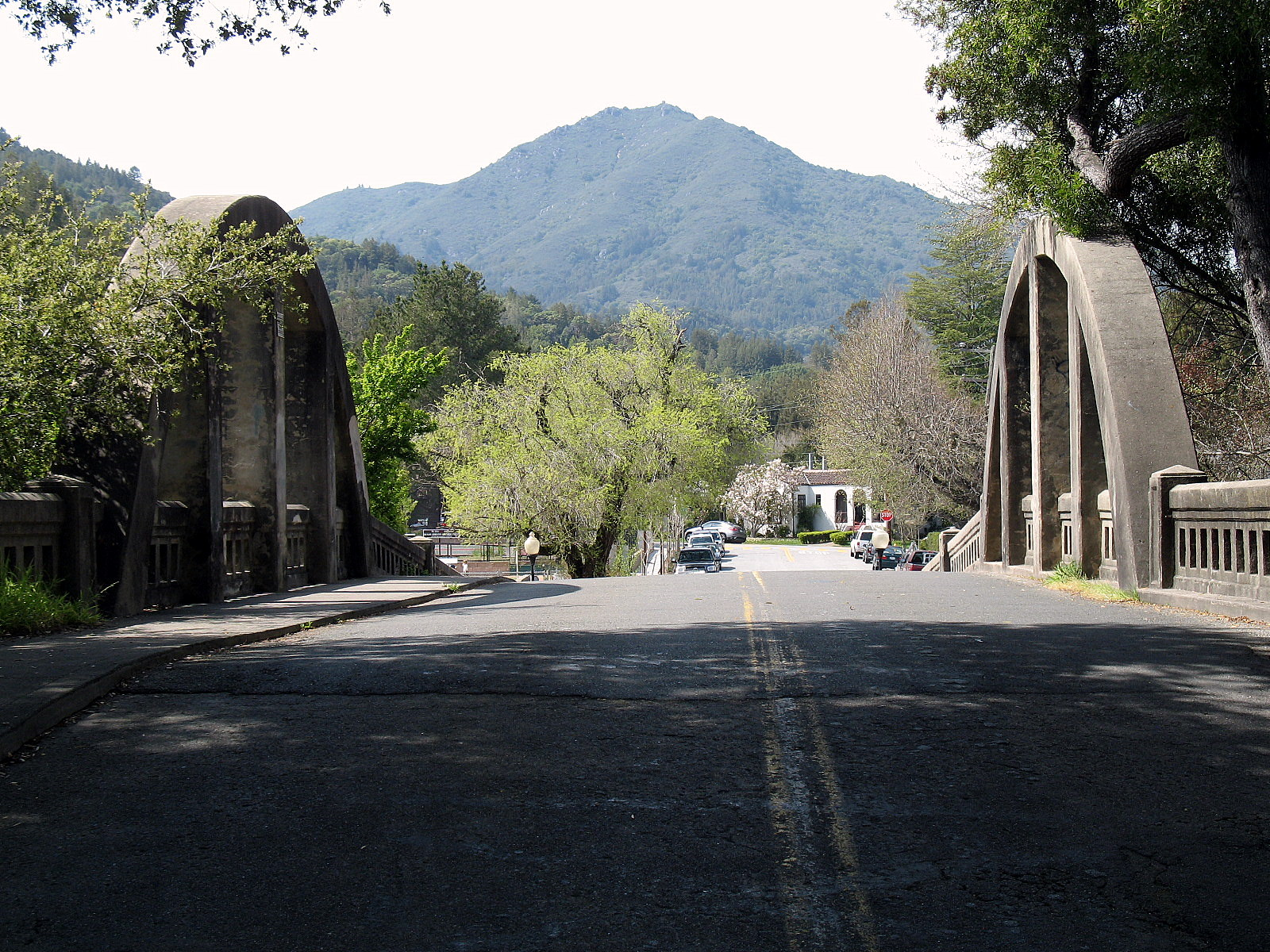
Alexander-Acacia Bridge, Larkspur

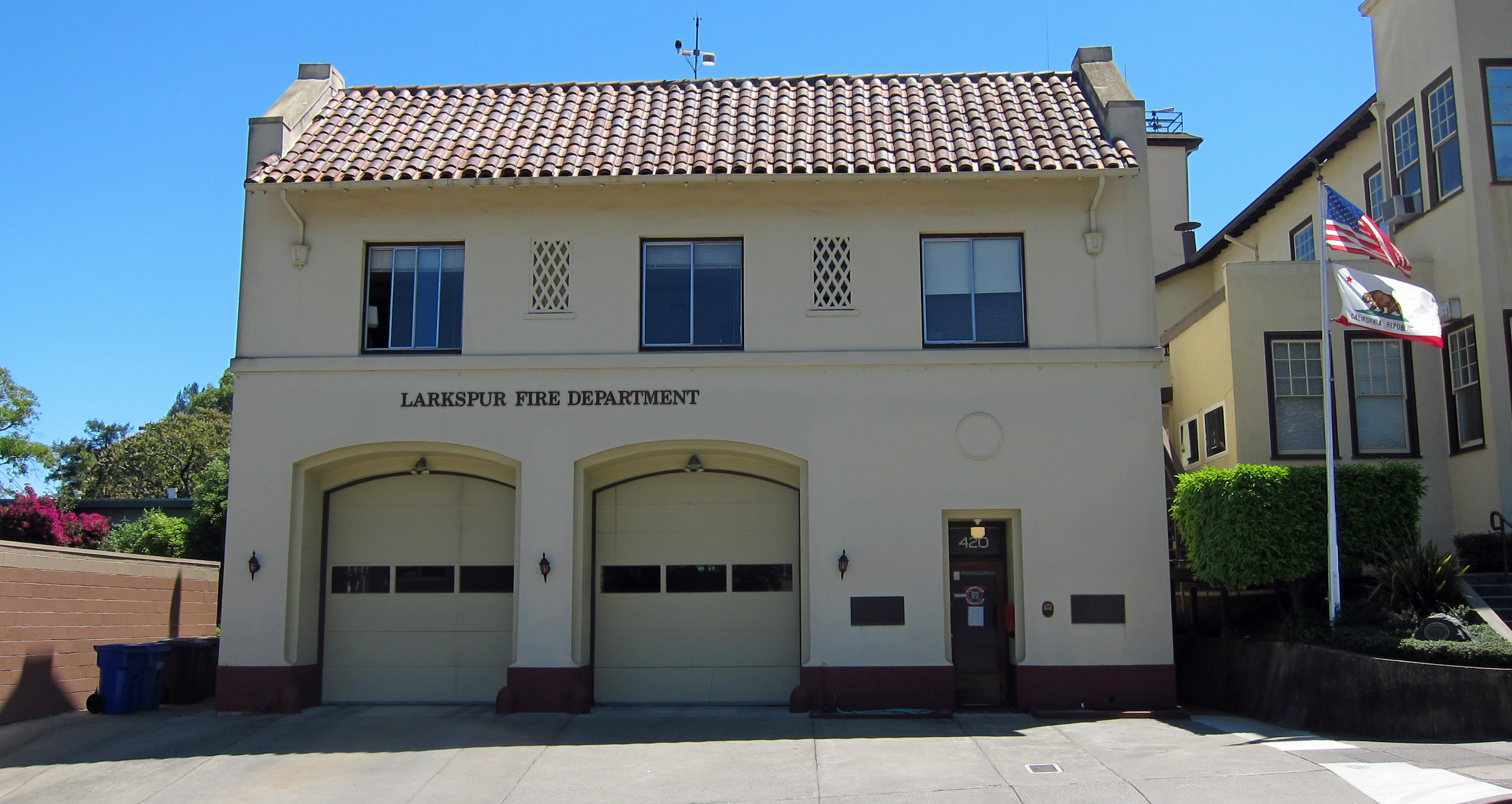
Fire Department, Larkspur

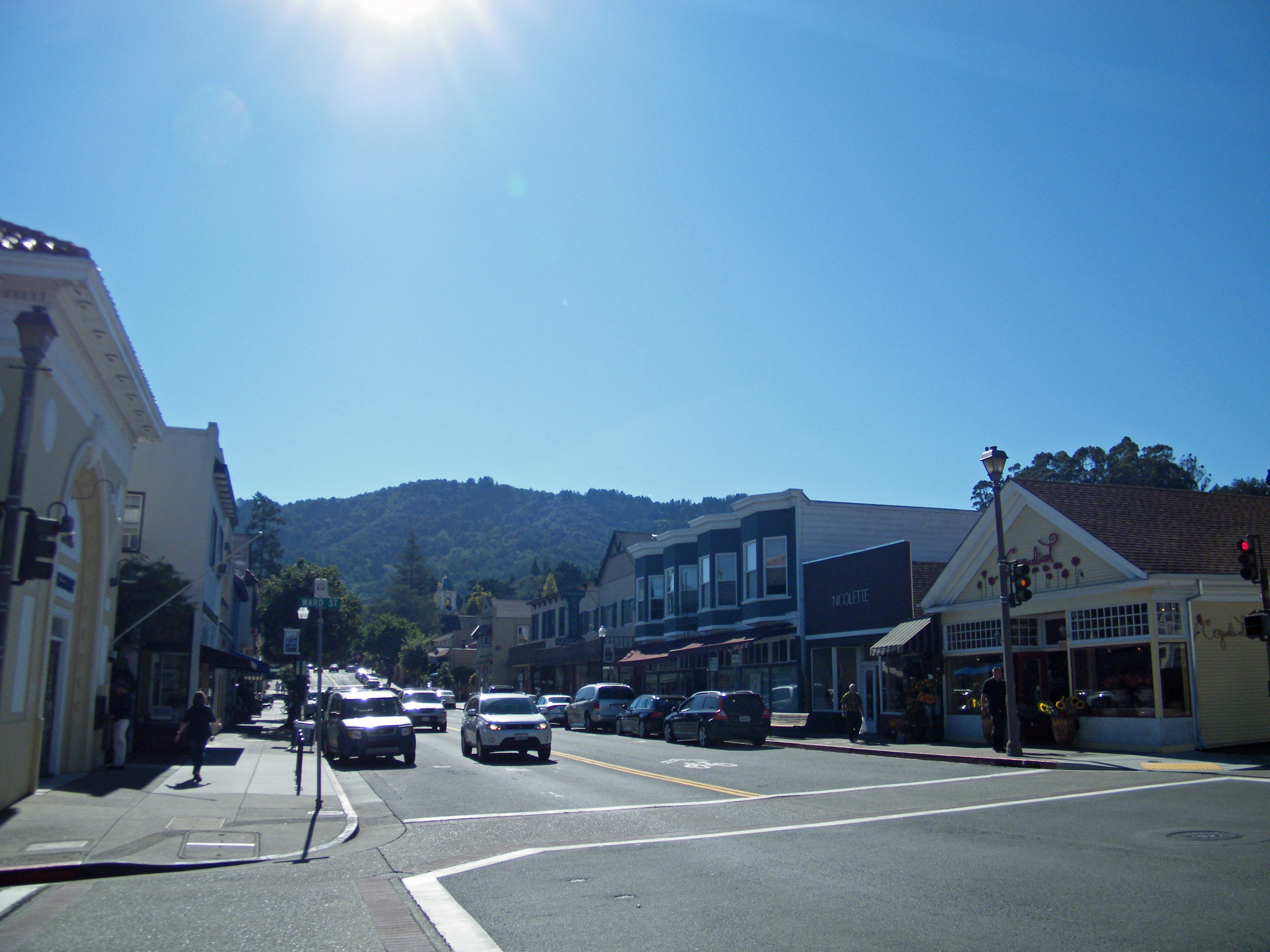
Downtown Larkspur

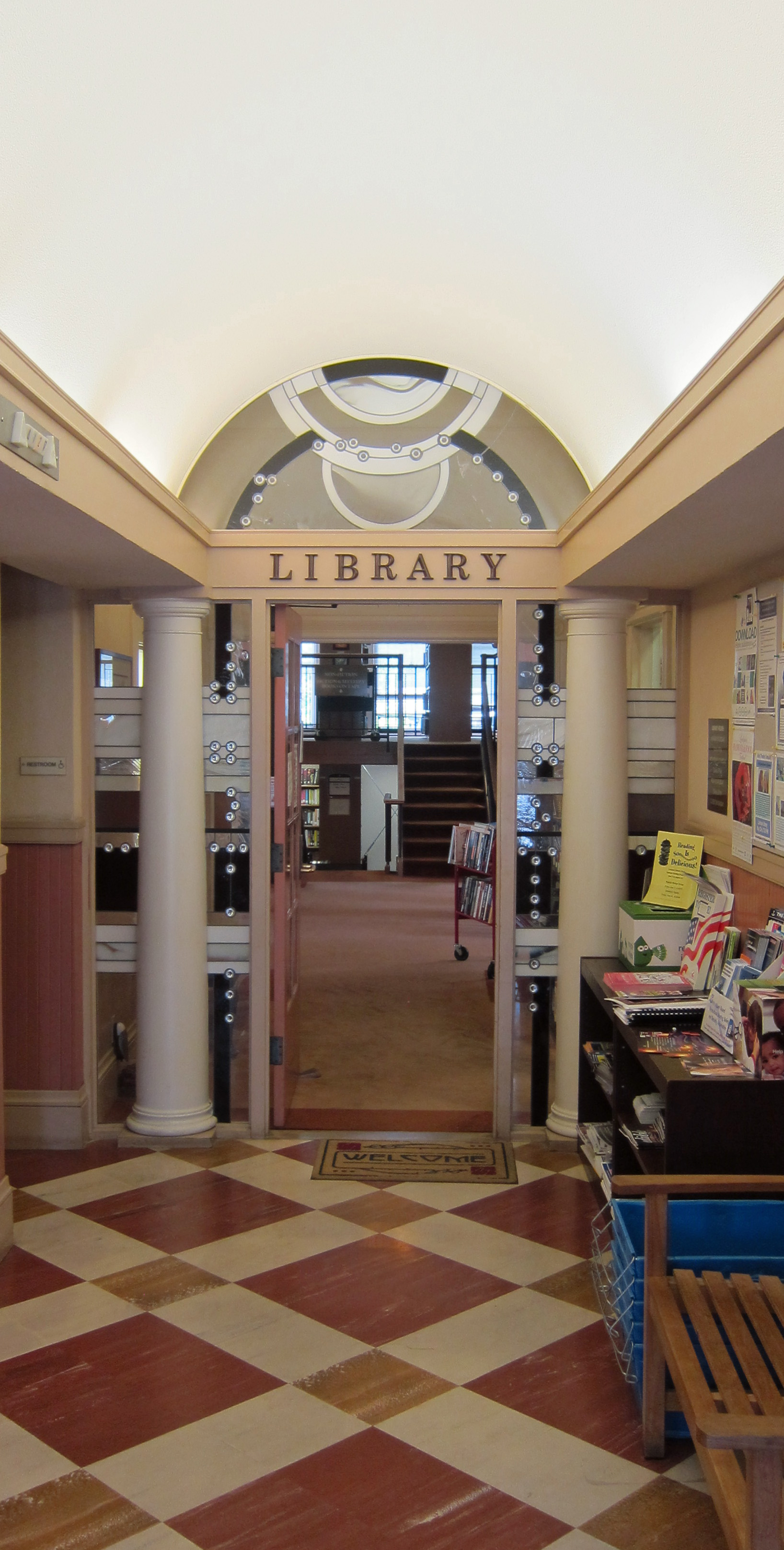
entrance to former Larkspur Library in city hall, Larkspur

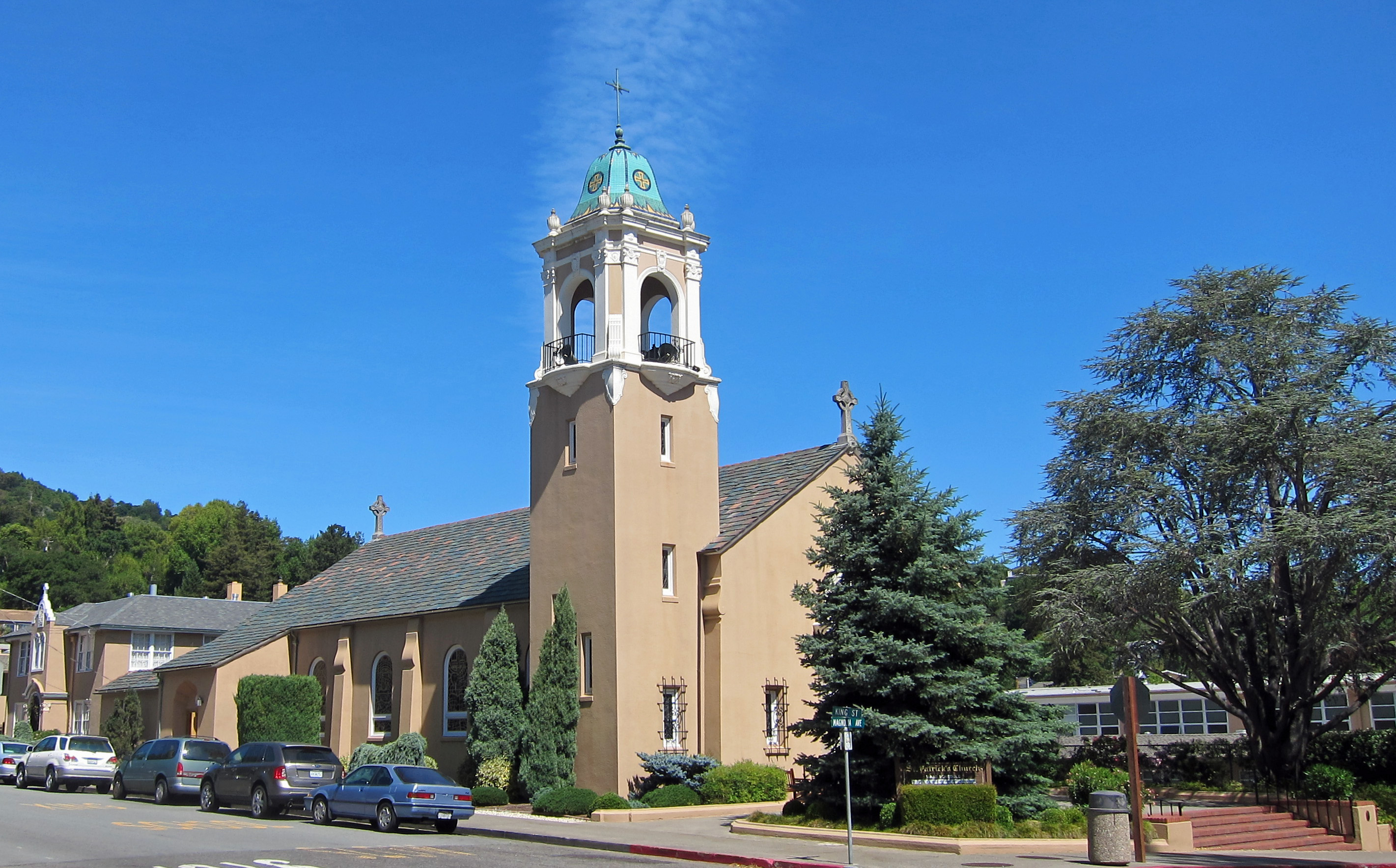
St. Patrick's Church, across from Larkspur City Hall

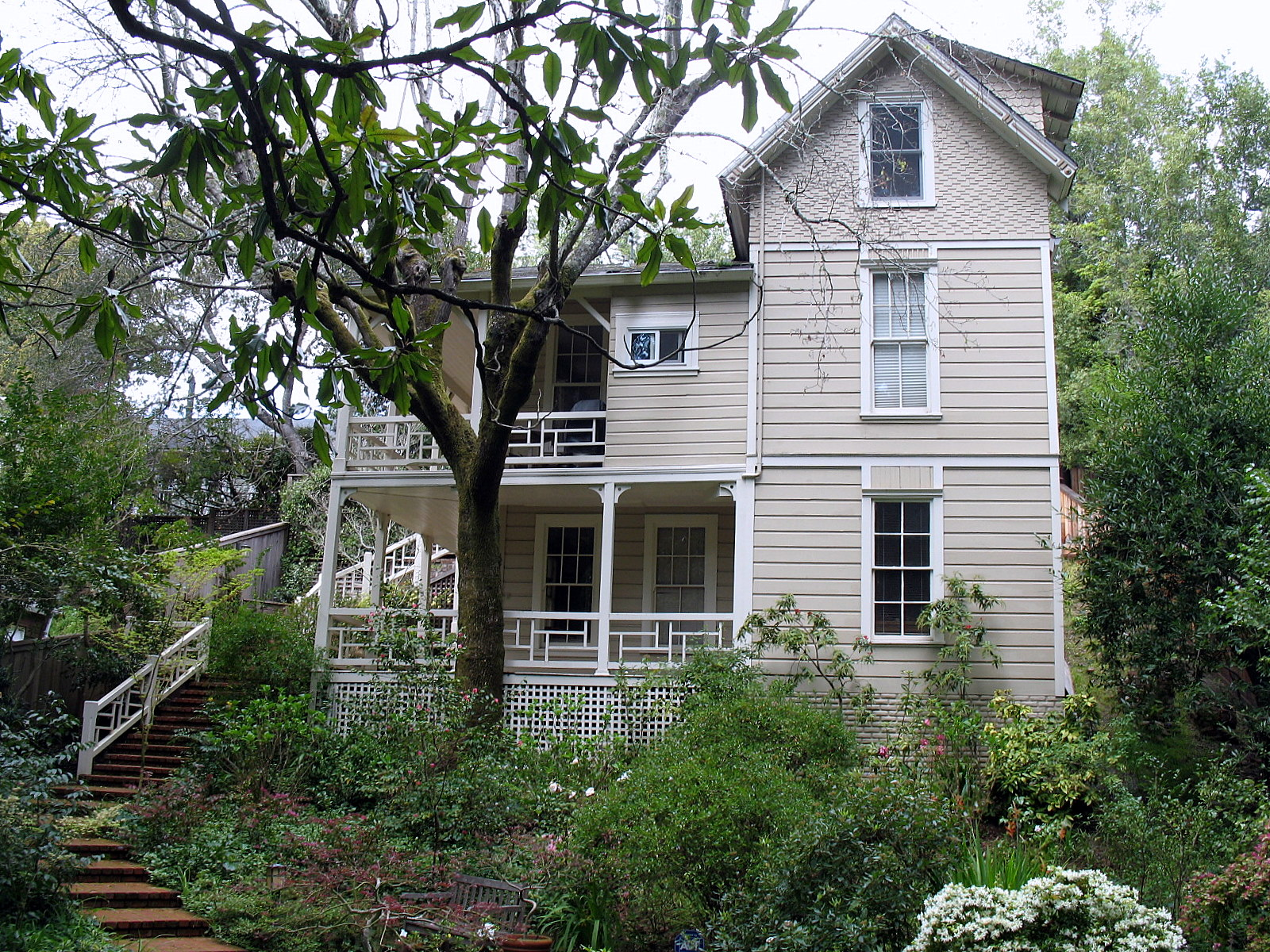
Dolliver House in Madrone Canyon, Larkspur

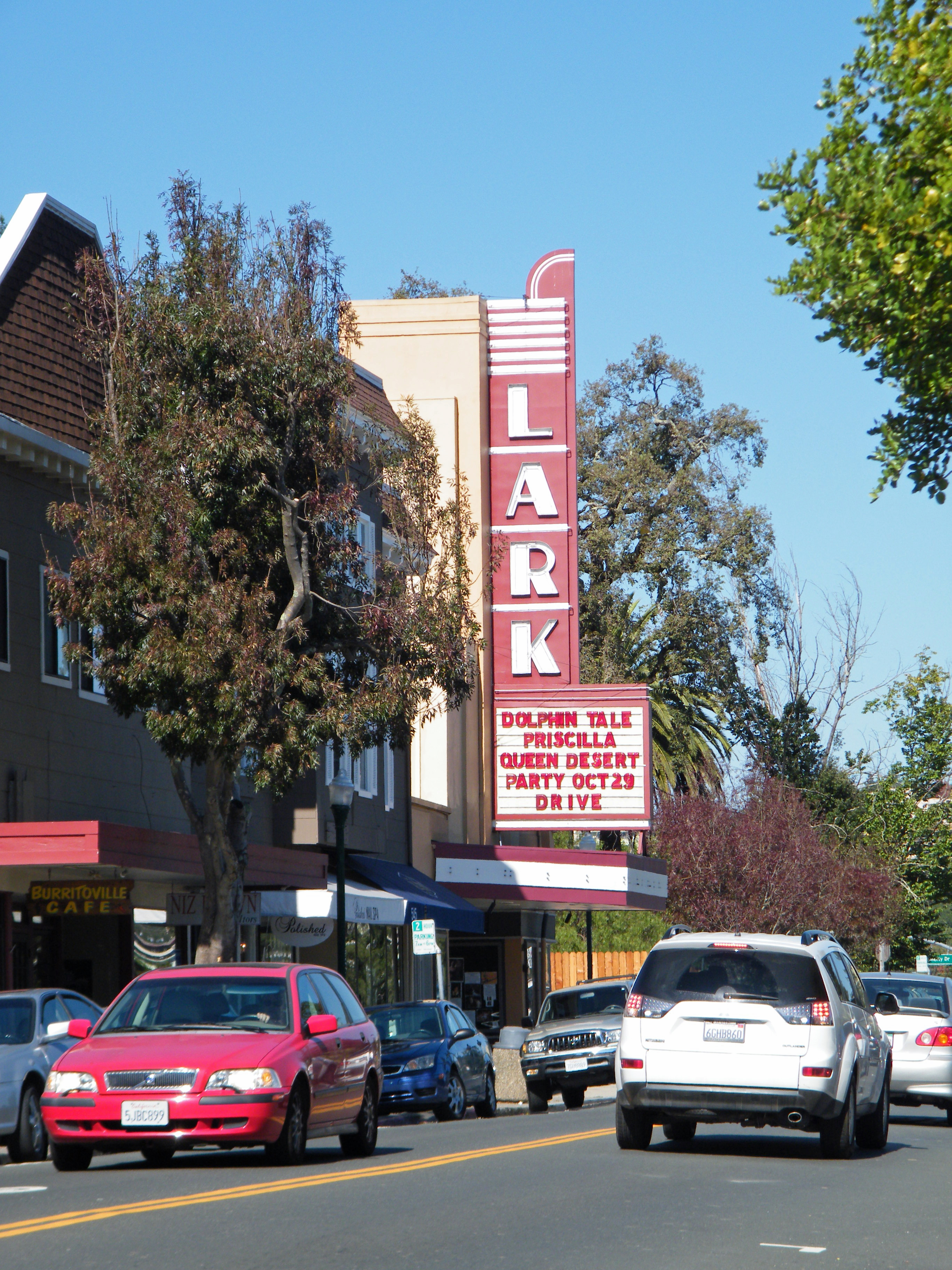
Lark Theater on Magnolia St., Larkspur

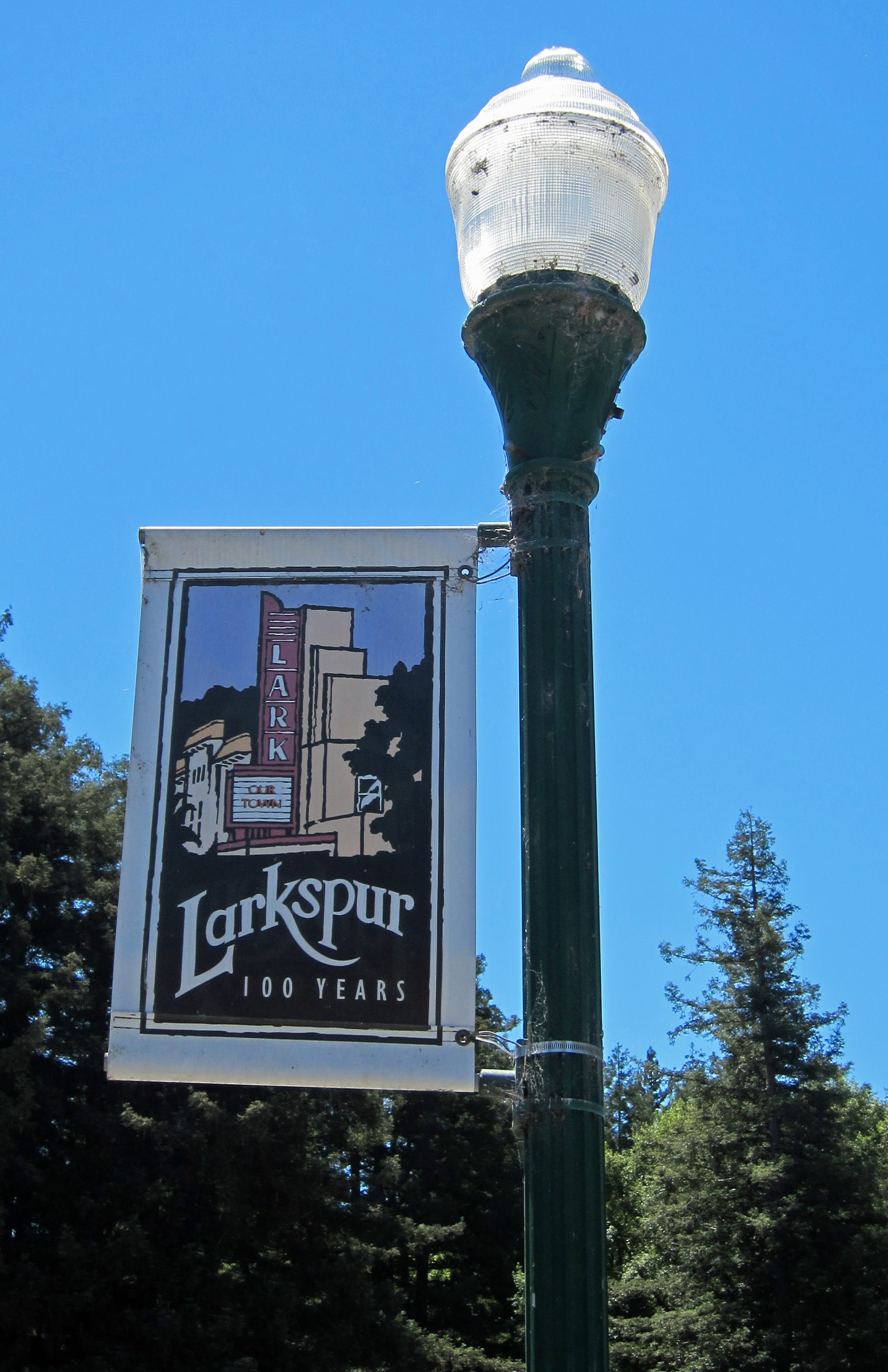
street banner celebrating the 100th anniversary of Larkspur

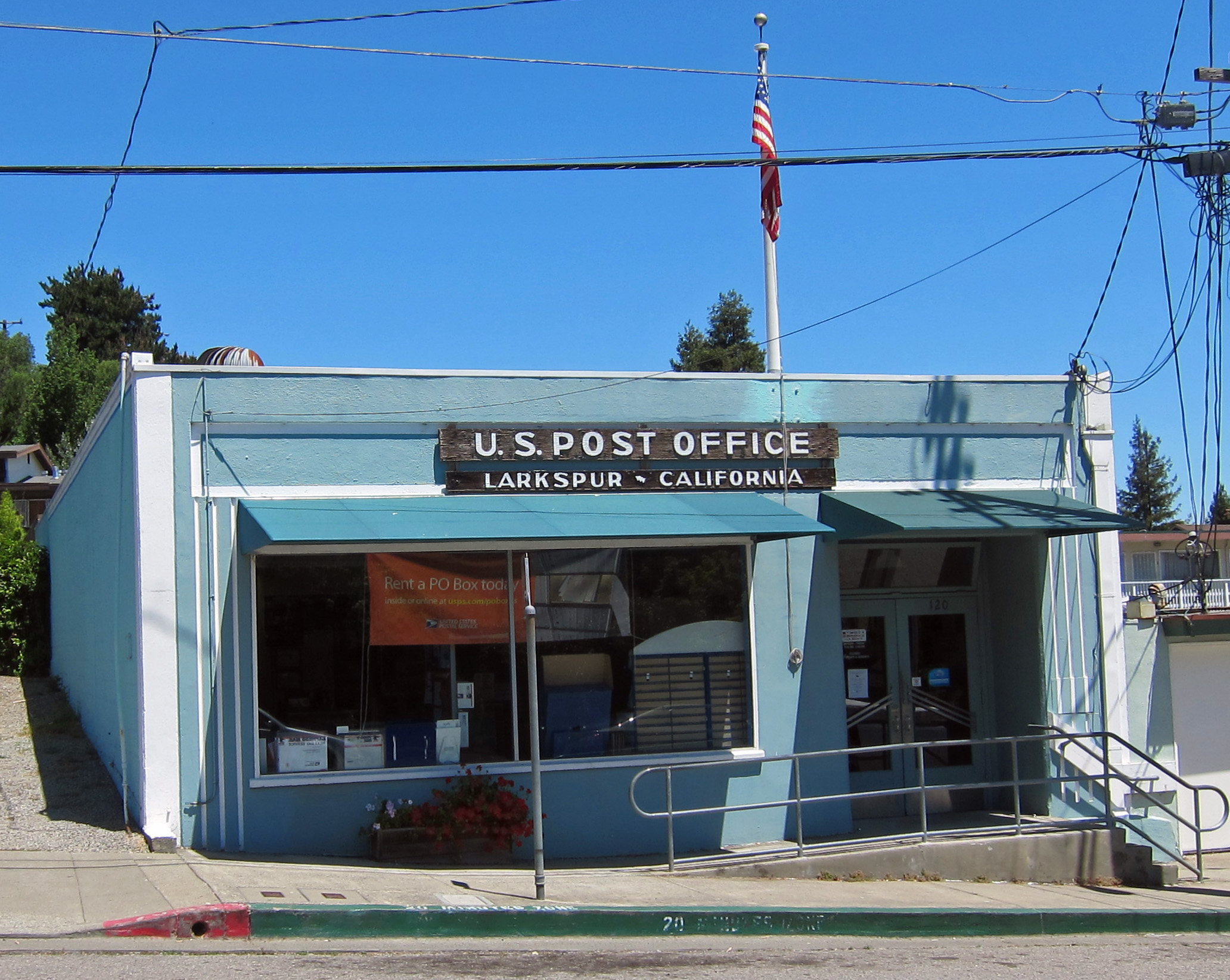
U.S. post office in Larkspur

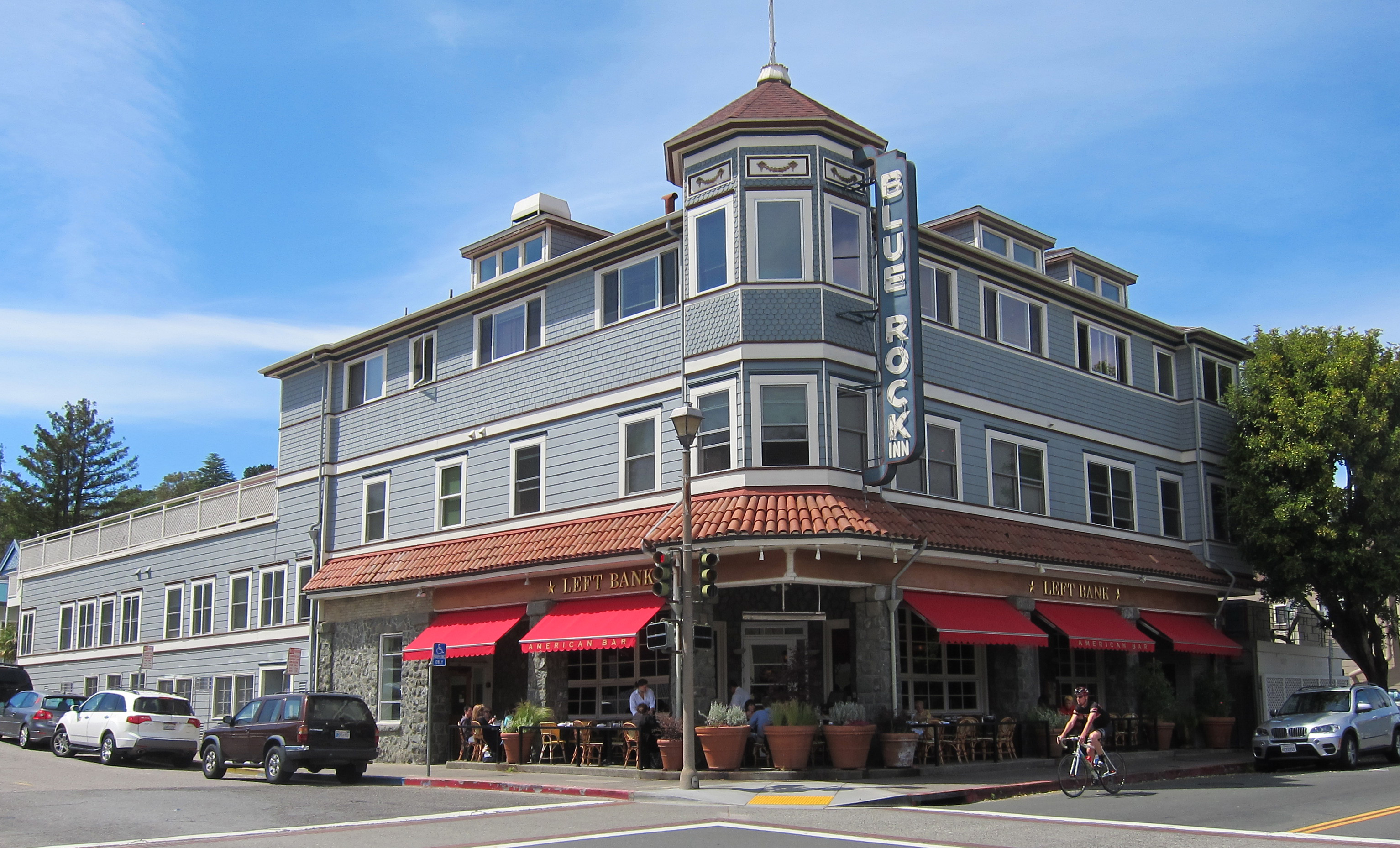
the Blue Rock Inn (formerly the Blue Rock Hotel) on Magnolia St., Larkspur

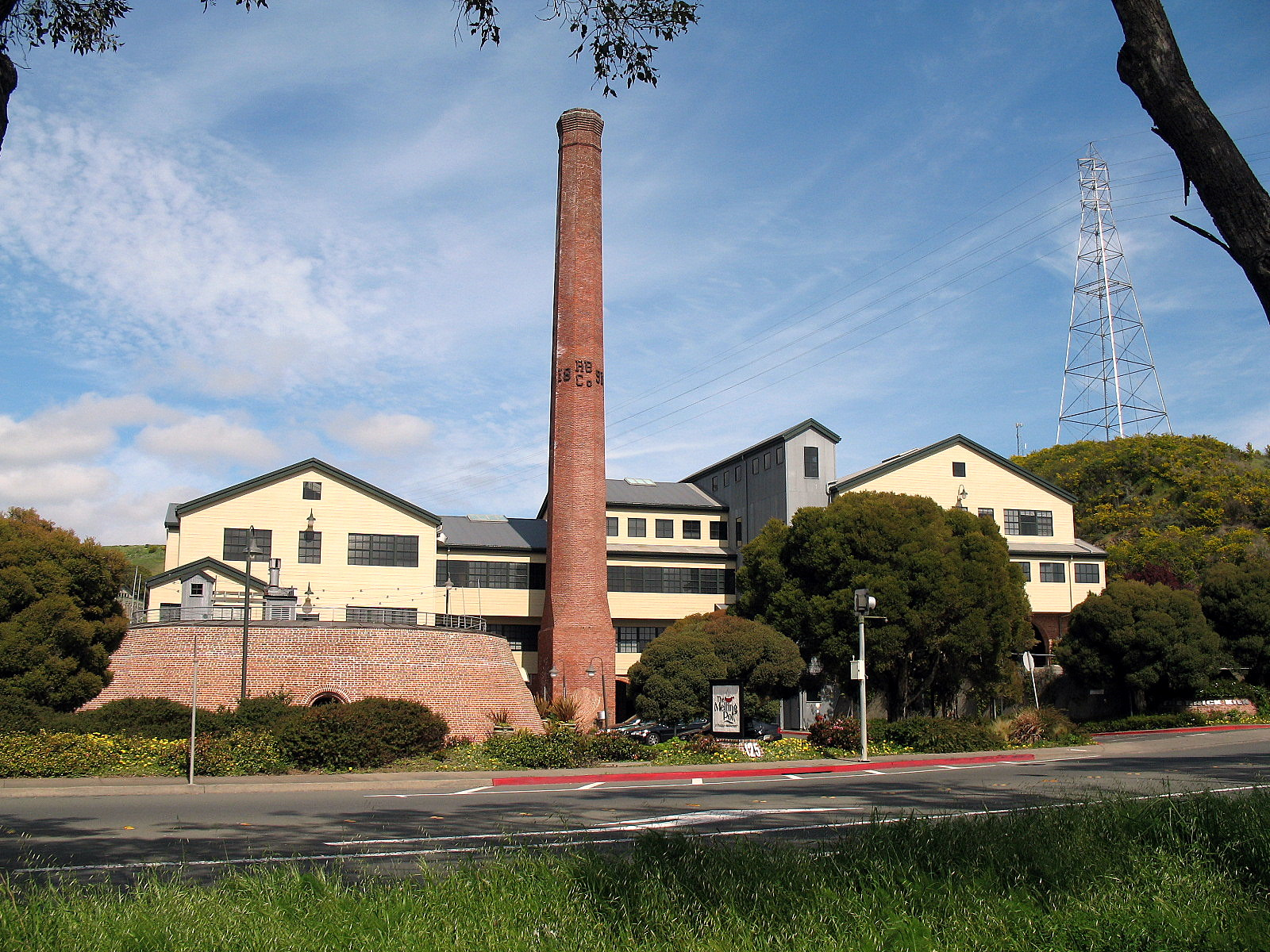
Greenbrae Brick Yard, Larkspur

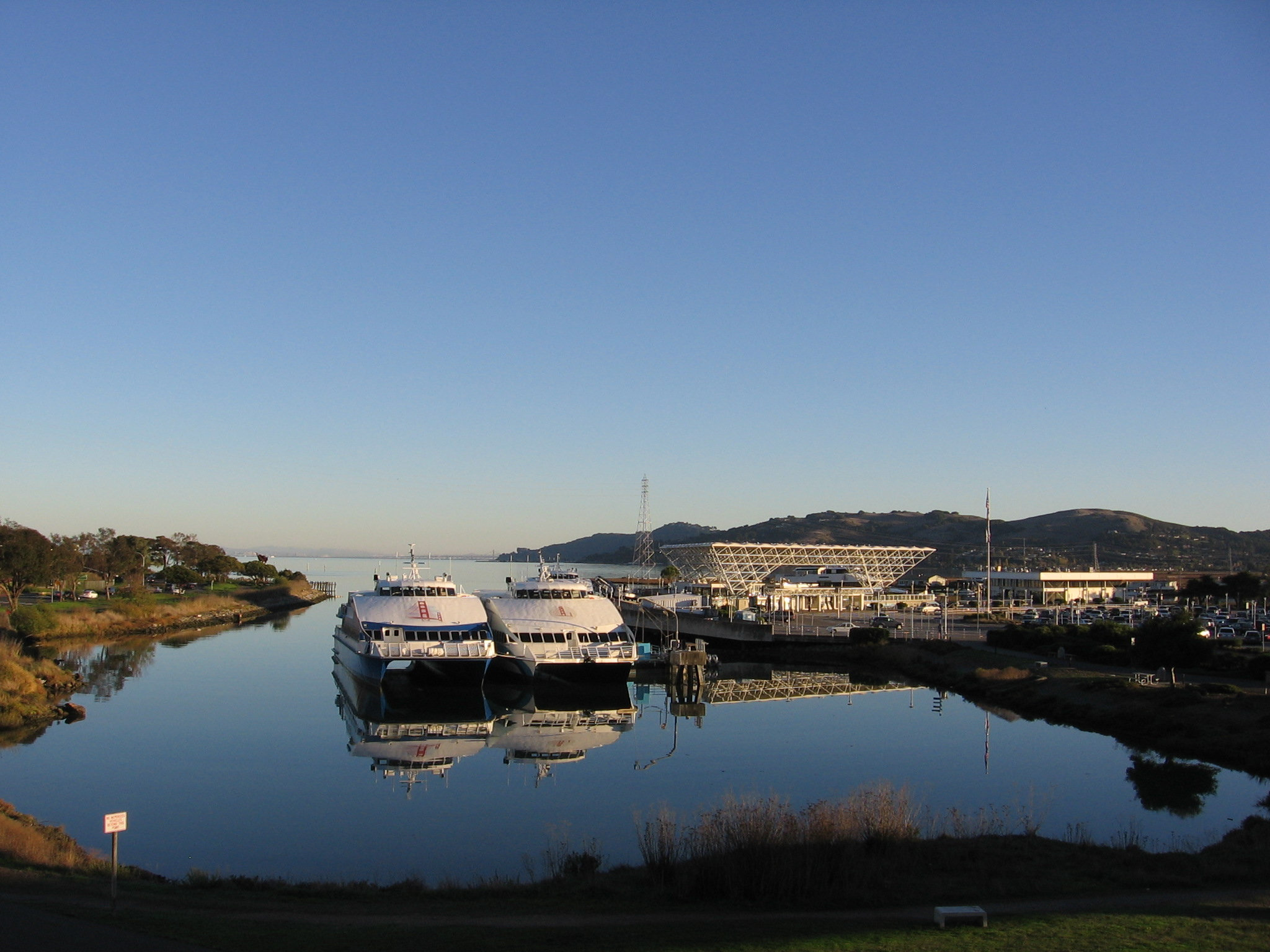
Larkspur Landing

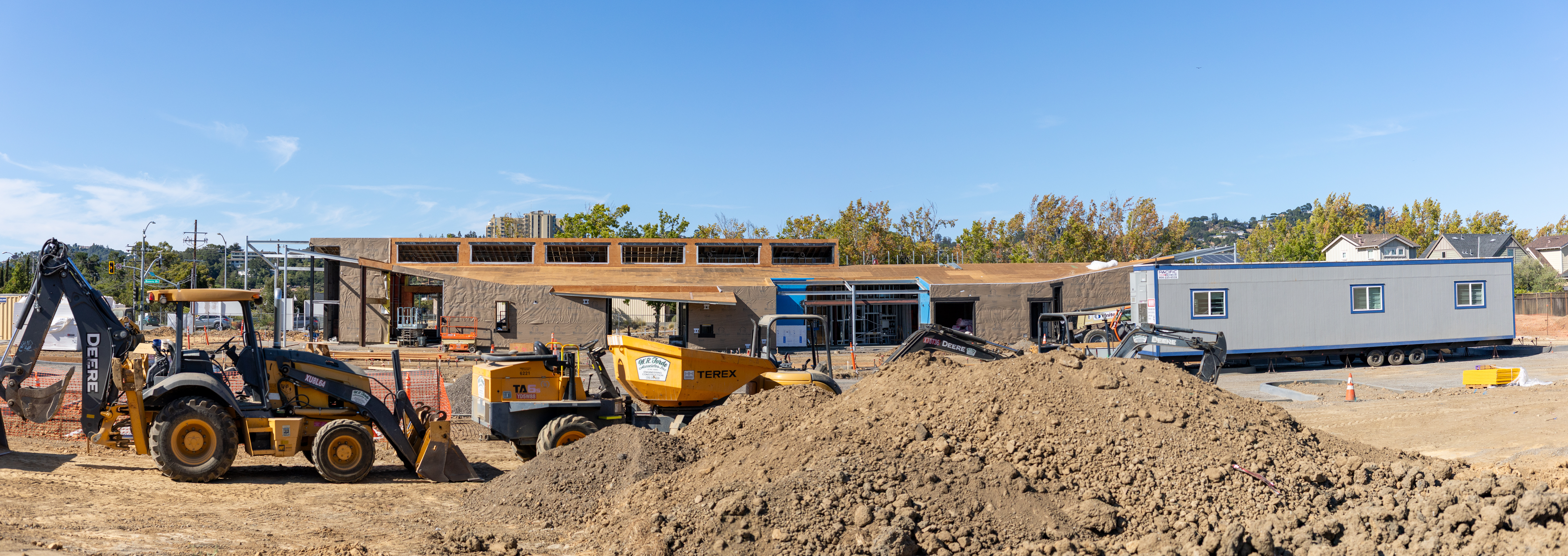
Larkspur Library (under construction in August 2025)

== See also ==
- Green Brae Brick Yard, historic site in Larkspur
- Larkspur Landing
- List of people from Marin County, California
