= Corte Madera Creek (Marin County) =

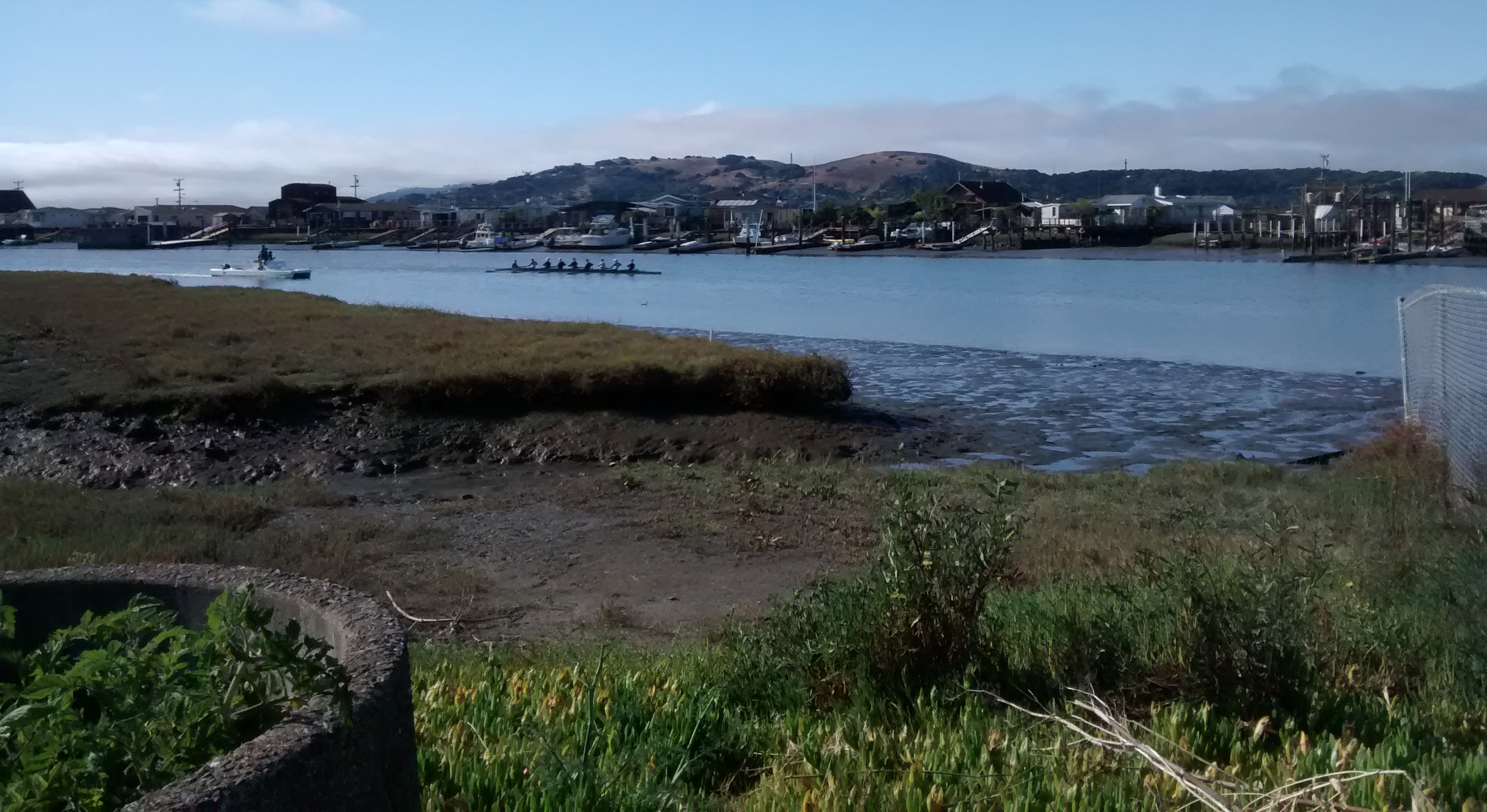
- Rowers on Corte Madera Creek

- Location of the mouth of Corte Madera Creek in California

Location
- Country: United States
- State: California
- Region: Marin County
- Cities: Ross, Kentfield, Corte Madera

Physical characteristics
- Source confluence: San Anselmo Creek and Ross Creek
  - location: Ross
  - coordinates: 37°57′58″N 122°33′26″W
  - elevation: 36 ft (11 m)
- Mouth: San Francisco Bay
  - location: Corte Madera, California
  - coordinates: 37°56′30″N 122°30′08″W
  - elevation: 0 ft (0 m)
- Discharge
  - location: Ross town hall
  - average: 0.33 cu ft/s (0.0093 m^{3}/s)
  - minimum: 0.00 cu ft/s (0 m^{3}/s)
  - maximum: 3.50 cu ft/s (0.099 m^{3}/s)

Basin features
- Tributaries
  - left: San Anselmo Creek
  - right: Ross Creek, Tamalpais Creek, Larkspur Creek

Corte Madera Creek is a short stream which flows southeast for 4.5 miles (7.2 km) in Marin County, California. Corte Madera Creek is formed by the confluence of San Anselmo Creek and Ross Creek in Ross and entering a tidal marsh at Kentfield before connecting to San Francisco Bay near Corte Madera.

== History ==
The Coast Miwok lived for thousands of years in the Corte Madera watershed, gathering pinole and acorns, hunting, and salmon-fishing. Traces of the Miwok include seven mounds in what is now the Town of Ross.

The Mexican government divided the northwest and southeast portions of the Corte Madera watershed into two separate land grants. The Rancho Cañada de Herrera, a 6,658-acre (26.94 km^{2}) rancho that includes the areas that are now Fairfax, Sleepy Hollow, and part of San Anselmo, was granted to Domingo Sais in 1839. His family used the land for crops, sheep, horses, and cattle and fished San Anselmo Creek for salmon. The Rancho Punta de Quentin, an 8,877-acre (35.92 km^{2}) rancho established in 1840, was granted to Captain John B. R. Cooper, a sea captain from Boston, by Mexican Governor Juan Bautista Alvarado to repay a $5,250 debt. Cooper harvested timber and was also granted a license to hunt southern sea otter (Enhydra lutris nereis), then prevalent at the mouth of Corte Madera Creek. Rancho Punta de Quentin is now the towns of San Anselmo, Ross, Kentfield, and Larkspur.

Corte Madera Creek is named for the Spanish corte de madera meaning "a place where wood is cut".

A Tasmanian immigrant, James Ross, who had made a fortune selling liquor to gold panners in San Francisco, bought much of the Rancho Punta de Quentin in 1840 for $50,000. Ross continued logging and also started a regular schooner route to San Francisco to transport the wood. His family established an estate at the site that is now the Marin Art and Garden Center.

== Ecology ==
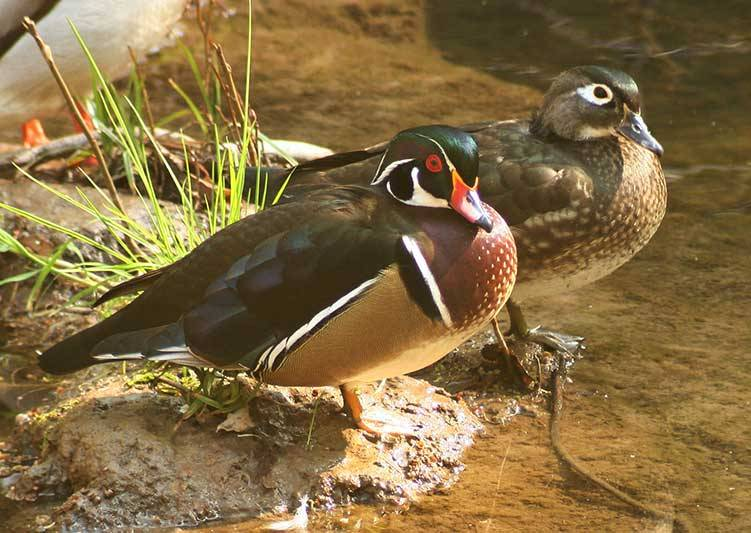
Pair of wood ducks (Aix sponsa) on the creek

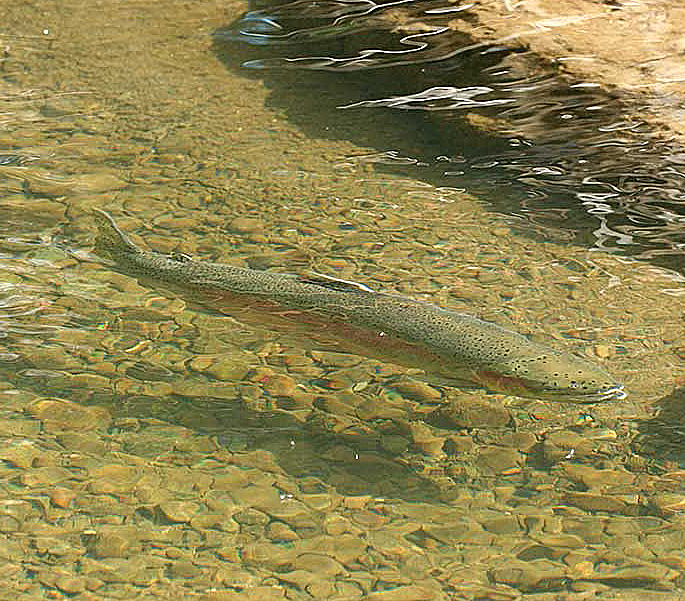
Steelhead trout in the creek

Corte Madera Creek is one of few streams flowing into San Francisco Bay with a steelhead trout (Oncorhynchus mykiss) population. The best spawning gravels are in Upper San Anselmo Creek, Ross Creek, and Sleepy Hollow Creek. Fairfax Creek has a total barrier to fish passage at its confluence with San Anselmo Creek. Larkspur Creek is rumored to have had steelhead long ago, and the occasional steelhead is still seen in Tamalpais Creek. Chinook salmon (Oncorhynchus tshawytscha) currently use the watershed.

Historically, Corte Madera Creek watershed supported coho salmon (Oncorhynchus kisutch) with recorded observations dating from 1926 to 1927, the 1960s, 1981, and the last sighting in 1984.

The main non-salmonid fish species in the Corte Madera Creek Watershed include the three-spined stickleback (Gasterosteus aculeatus), California roach (Lavinia symmetricus), several species of sculpin (Cottus spp.), and Sacramento sucker (Catostomus occidentalis occidentalis).

The creek hosts many protected species in addition to steelhead trout, including at least 17 plants, northern spotted owls (Strix occidentalis caurina), San Pablo song sparrow (Melospiza melodia samuelis), Ridgway's rail (Rallus obsoletus) and black (Laterallus jamaicensis) rails, and the salt marsh harvest mouse (Reithrodontomys raviventris). The 1,000-acre (4.0 km^{2}) Corte Madera Marsh Ecological Reserve is recognized as an Important Bird Area by the Audubon Society. Just south of the marsh, there is a tidal channel named San Clement Creek where harbor seals (Phoca vitulina) haul out.

== Watershed ==
The Corte Madera (a.k.a. Ross Valley) Watershed ranges in elevation from sea level to 2,571 feet (784 m) at the East Peak of Mount Tamalpais. The watershed covers 28 square miles (73 km^{2}) in the southeastern quarter of Marin County and encompasses the towns of Larkspur, Corte Madera, Kentfield, Ross, San Anselmo, and Fairfax. The watershed includes Corte Madera, Ross, San Anselmo, Tamalpais, Sleepy Hollow, Fairfax, and Cascade creeks and Phoenix Lake. Larkspur and Tamalpais creeks drain directly into the estuary/tidal portion. The watershed includes 44 miles (71 km) of stream channels. Ross Creek drains the northern slope of Mt. Tamalpais; San Anselmo Creek and its tributaries drain the northwestern portion of the watershed. The two channels join to form Corte Madera Creek, which continues through more than a mile of concrete-lined channel past the confluences of Larkspur and Tamalpais Creeks and into the salt marsh at the mouth.

== See also ==
- List of watercourses in the San Francisco Bay Area
- California Fur Rush
