= Rancho Las Baulines =

Mexican land grant in California

Coordinates: 37.930°N 122.680°W

Rancho Las Baulines was a 8,911-acre (36.06 km^{2}) Mexican land grant in present-day Marin County, California, given in 1846 by Governor Pío Pico to Gregorio Briones. The grant extended around Bolinas Lagoon and encompassed present-day Stinson Beach and Bolinas.

== History ==
Gregorio Briones (1797-1863) born in Monterey, was the son of Marcos Briones who accompanied Junípero Serra in 1769. In 1819 Gregorio entered the army and remained in it for eleven years. In 1822 he married Maria Ramona Garcia (1803-), the sister of Rafael Garcia of Rancho Tomales y Baulines. Briones' sister, Juana Briones de Miranda, owned Rancho La Purísima Concepción. Gregorio Briones served as alcalde of San Jose in 1830, Pinole 1832-1837 and San Mateo 1837–1839. In 1837, his son, Jose Pablo Briones (1823-1897), moved with the family's cattle to Rafael Garcia's ranch in the area around Bolinas Lagoon. Garcia moved north up the Olema Valley to his Rancho Tomales y Baulines grant. The rest of the Briones family joined Pablo in 1838 and Gregorio moved there permanently in 1839. Governor Pio Pico granted Briones the two square league Rancho Las Baulines in 1846.

With the cession of California to the United States following the Mexican-American War, the 1848 Treaty of Guadalupe Hidalgo provided that the land grants would be honored. As required by the Land Act of 1851, a claim for Rancho Las Baulines was filed with the Public Land Commission in 1853, and the grant was patented to Gregorio Briones in 1866. When Gregorio Briones died in 1863, he left the remaining acreage to his children, who operated a dairy farm there. The family sold the dairy farm in 1982, and it was then subdivided.

== See also ==
- Ranchos of California
- List of Ranchos of California
