= Stinson =

Stinson may refer to:

- Stinson, Ontario
- Stinson (surname)
- Stinson Aircraft Company
- Stinson Lake, in the White Mountains of New Hampshire, in the town of Rumney
- Stinson Municipal Airport, San Antonio, Texas
- Stinson Theatres, a Canadian movie theatre chain
- Stinson Records, an American folk and blues music label
- Stinson Beach, California
  - Stinson Beach School
  - Stinson Gulch

== See also ==
- Stinton
