= Bolinas Ridge =

Mountain ridge in California, United States

Coordinates: 37°54′26″N 122°37′13″W

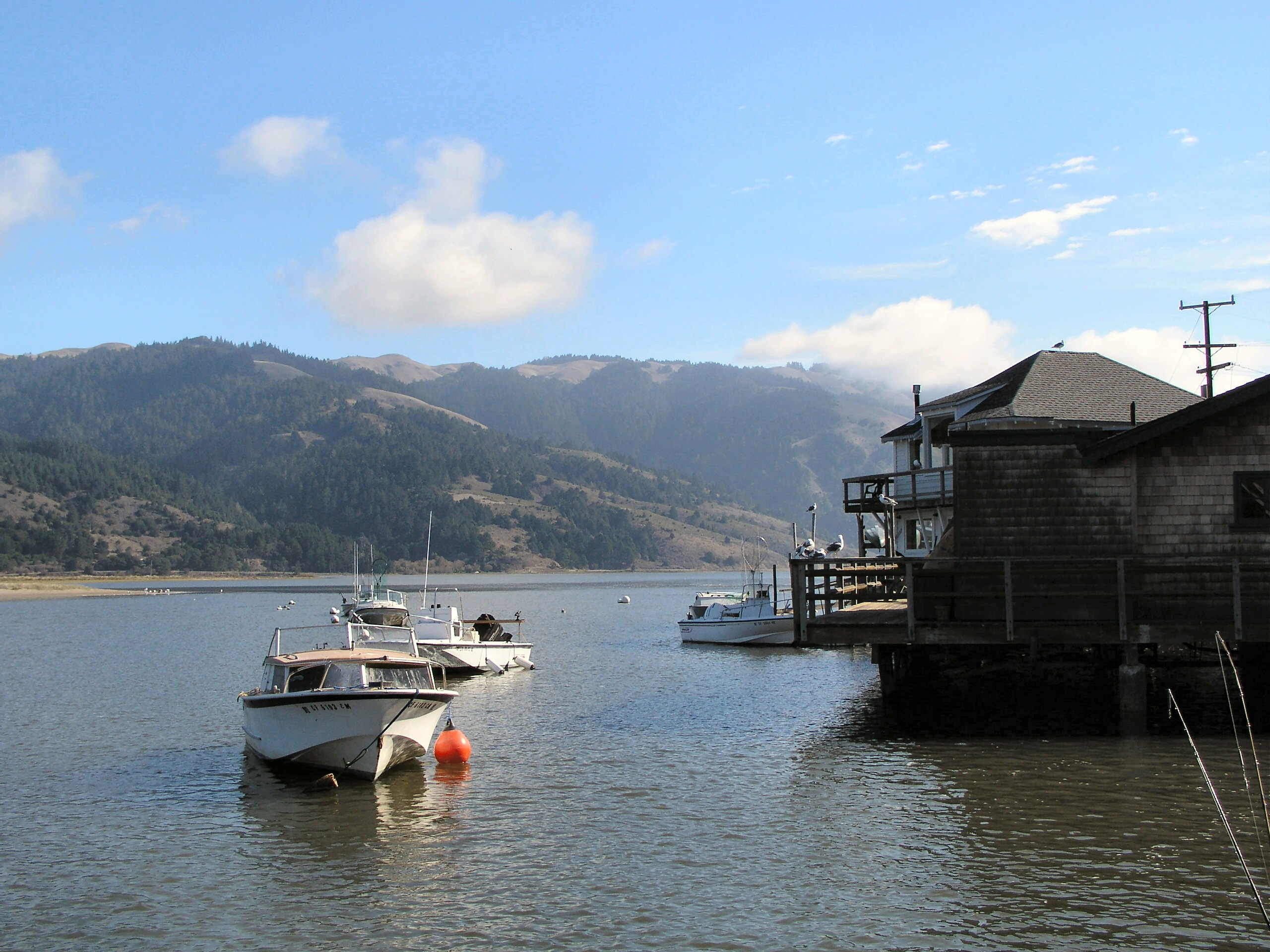
Bolinas Ridge from the waterfront town of Bolinas, California on Bolinas Lagoon.

Bolinas Ridge is a north-south ridge in southwestern Marin County, California. Much of the western side of the ridge is protected parkland in the Golden Gate National Recreation Area, and the eastern side is watershed lands of the Marin Municipal Water District.

== Setting ==
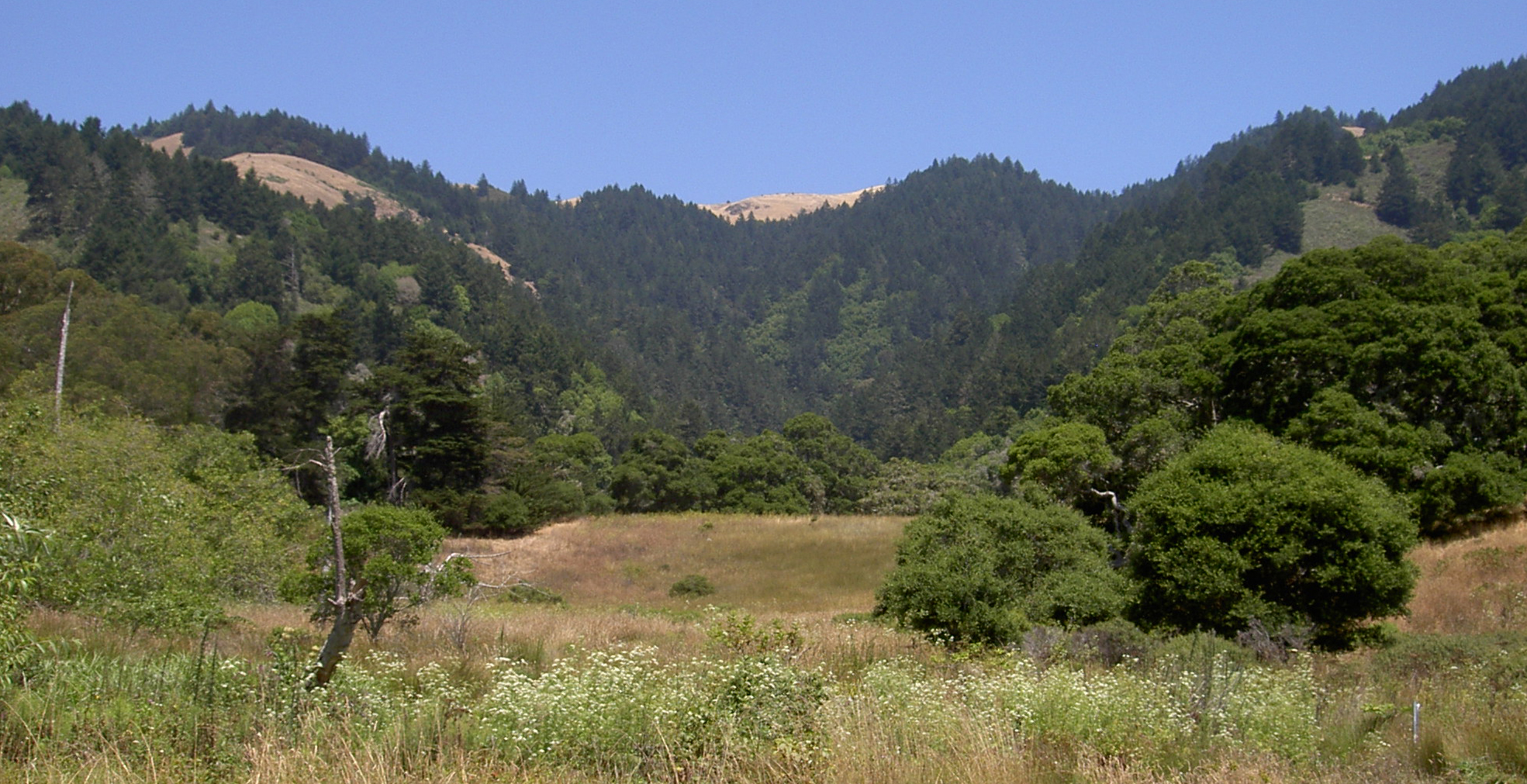
Stinson Gulch in 2009 with the crest of Bolinas Ridge forming the horizon.

The ridge parallels a section of the San Andreas Fault, and features panoramic vistas with trees, meadows, rounded hillsides, Bolinas Lagoon, Tomales Bay, the Olema Valley and the Pacific Ocean. The base of the ridge at the south end includes the community of Stinson Beach, with the ridge rising abruptly from around 400 feet (120 m) to over 1,900 feet (580 m) at the highest point. West Ridgecrest Road, a two lane highway, runs along the southern portion of the ridge, and has been the location for numerous automobile commercial video shoots. This roadway begins at the Rock Spring parking area and heads north along the ridge. Views to the east include lakes and undulating hills, with the ocean to the west, the source of dense fog that sometimes obscures all views and limits visibility to a few feet. A popular site for hiking and biking, Mount Tamalpais, where Bolinas Ridge is located, offers many different trails and paths for visitors. A popular trail is the Bolinas Ridge Trail which is a loop that connects to Samuel Taylor Park and is about 16.9 kilometers (or 10.5 miles).

In terms of weather, the temperature on Mount Tamalpais is fairly cool, generally somewhere between 43°F and 72°F. December through February tend to be the cooler months while June through October tend to be warmer.

== Flora ==
Much of the original old-growth Coast redwoods were logged off in the late 1800s and shipped out by way of Bolinas Lagoon; however, new redwoods have grown again in the years since, providing a second-growth forest in patches.

Today, a diverse community of plant life grows along the ridge. Along with the tall redwoods, sections include stands of Douglas fir, various mixed scrub and open grassland hillsides, hardwood woodlands and along the lower slopes, maritime chaparral that features rare Marin Manzanita (Arctostaphylos virgata) and a federally designated 'Species of Concern', Mason's ceanothus (Ceanothus masonii), listed by the state of California as rare. Specifically, starting from the Jewell Trail Junction, the Bolinas Ridge area is mostly grasslands until about a quarter of the way down the Bolinas Ridge Trail, where the trail starts to border a forest made up of Douglas fir and some Coast redwoods.

== Fauna ==
There are few animals that have robust communities near Bolinas Ridge, but within Mount Tamalpais State Park, black-tailed deer (Odocoileus hemionus), raccoons (Procyon lotor), and squirrels (Sciuridae) have been known to roam. Additionally there is a plentiful bird population. Red-tailed hawks (Buteo jamaicensis) and northern harriers (Circus cyaneus) are commonly spotted and over 150 different bird species are known to the area.

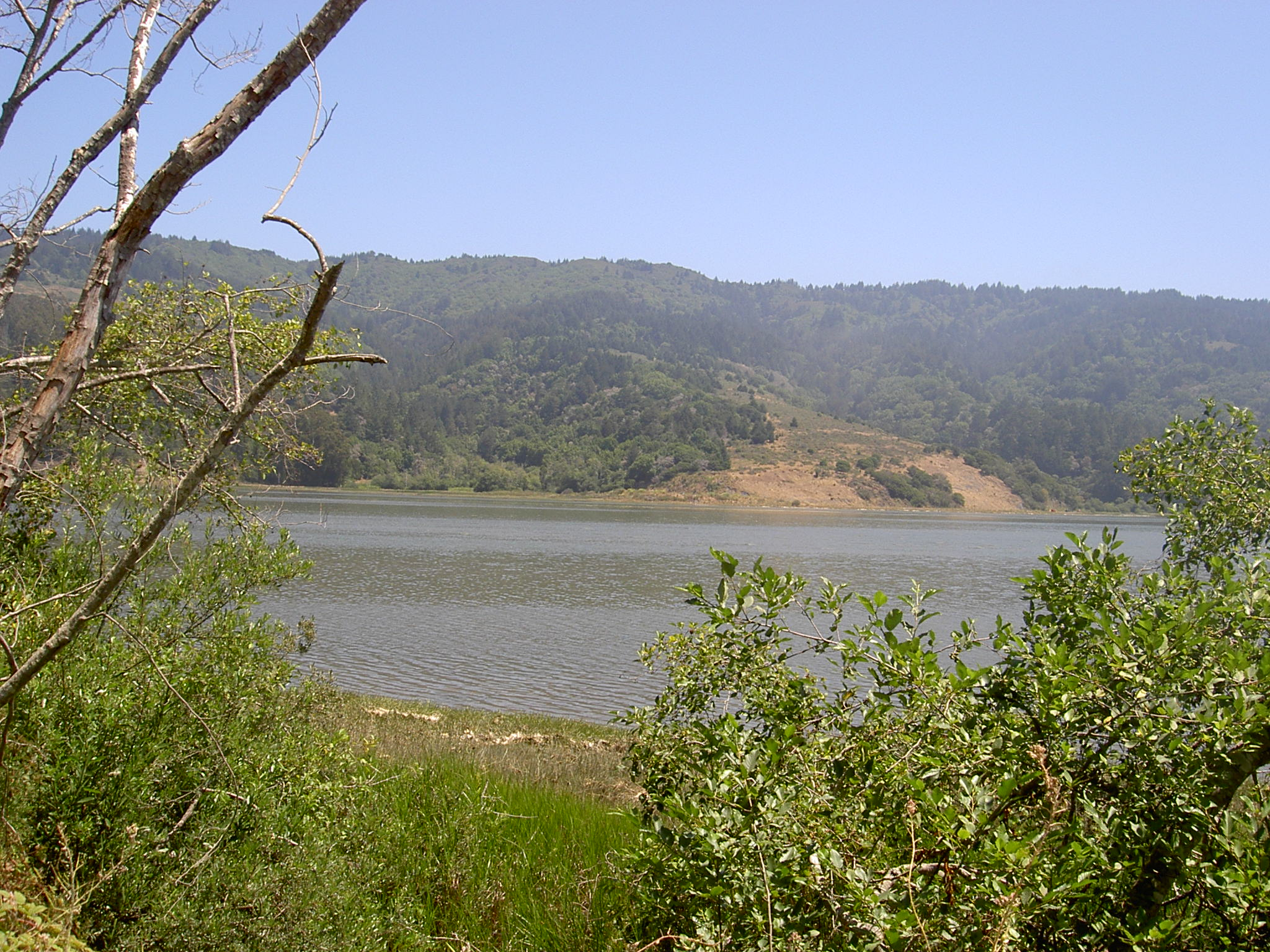
West side of Bolinas Ridge in Marin County, California, viewed from across the Bolinas Lagoon, 2009

== See also ==
- Bolinas, California
- Audubon Canyon
- Copper Mine Gulch
- McKinnan Gulch
- Morses Gulch
- Pike County Gulch
- Stinson Gulch
- Wilkins Gulch
