= Kent Island (California) =

Island in Marin County, California

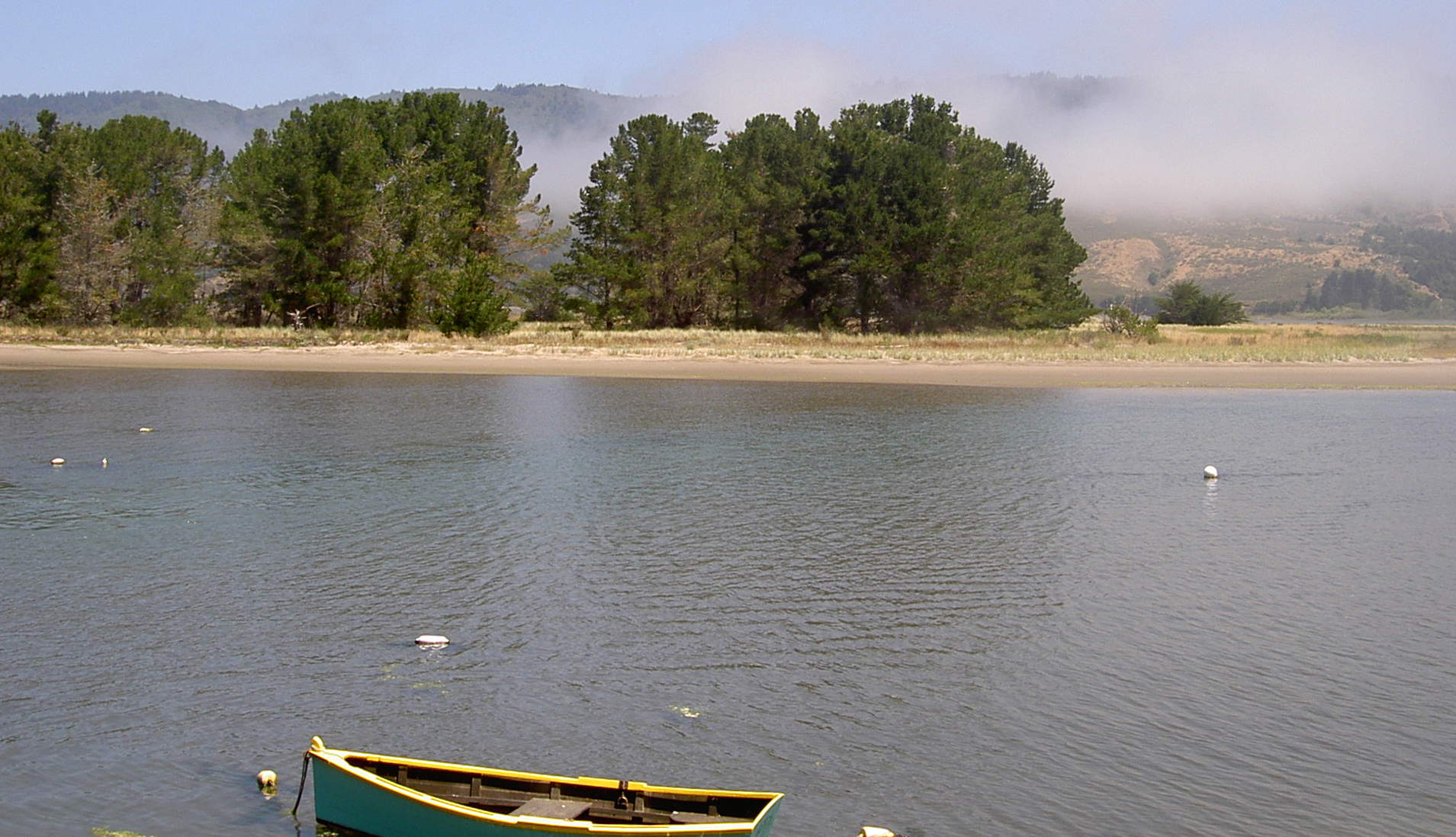
- Kent Island in 2009

- Location within California Location within the United States

Geography
- Location: Bolinas, California
- Coordinates: 37°54′44″N 122°40′43″W

Administration
- United States
- State: California
- County: Marin County, California
- Governing body: Greater Farallones National Marine Sanctuary

Kent Island is a small island in Marin County, California. In 1964, it was proposed for large-scale development including a hotel and marina, but the plan was defeated in 1967. The island is now included in the Greater Farallones National Marine Sanctuary.

== Location ==
The island is located within the Bolinas Lagoon, a salt water inlet of the Pacific Ocean. The island is opposite the town of Bolinas, near Stinson Beach, California, and is surrounded by mud flats at low tide.

On April 18, 2008, Sage Tezak, Bolinas Lagoon Restoration Coordinator of the Gulf of the Farallones National Marine Sanctuary stated in an Advisory Council Meeting that Kent Island's shoreline had historically been dynamic in that it would move, causing the island to change shape. He noted that the appearance of invasive plant species on the island in recent years has stabilized the shoreline, eliminating the gradual movement of the island.

== History ==
=== Saving Kent Island ===
In 1964, development on the island was proposed by Bahia Baulines Inc., which had leased 100 acres (40 ha) of underwater tidelands. The plan would have begun by dredging mud from the northern end of the lagoon and depositing it on the island to give it more height and to increase the overall size. The construction phase would have included a hotel and restaurant, both with parking lots, as well as an office, a boat facility and marina for up to 1,500 watercraft, and a helicopter pad.

The plan was terminated in 1967 when Audubon Canyon Ranch, the Nature Conservancy and the Marin Conservation League worked together to save the 110 acres (45 ha) island from the development. Funds were raised to purchase the island and give it to the county on the stipulation that the property remain undeveloped as a nature preserve. The Marin County Board of Supervisors voted to accept the island into the public domain just hours before the Bolinas Harbor District would have acted to condemn the island in court to stop Marin County's conservation effort.

=== 1980s to present day ===
The island became a part of Gulf of the Farallones National Marine Sanctuary in 1981. In 1998, Bolinas Lagoon was declared one of 17 Wetlands of International Importance in the USA by UNESCO. There are ongoing concerns that the waters around the island are gradually silting, affecting both human activity as well as the flora and fauna of the area.

In 2009, the Marin County Open Space District and County of Marin were funded through NOAA to remove invasive species and restore native vegetation to approximately 23 acres (9.3 ha) of tidal marsh and regionally rare coastal dune habitat, on and around the island. The project will restore nesting habitat for the endangered snowy plover.

== Wildlife on and around Kent Island ==
A wildlife sanctuary, the island is a haul-out spot for harbor seals and their pups. A study of seal behavior on the island showed that the animals were often disturbed by nearby human activity, with people rowing past the island in canoes a primary cause. Humans approaching the seals closer than 100 meters caused the animals to leave the sites much more often than activities by people at a greater distance.

The island is also a known roosting spot for the California brown pelican. Other avian life includes the long-billed curlew, willets, ring-billed gulls, marbled godwits, American avocets, and black-bellied plovers.

== See also ==
- List of islands of California
