= Bolinas Bay =

Bay in California, United States

Coordinates: 37°53′36″N 122°39′58″W

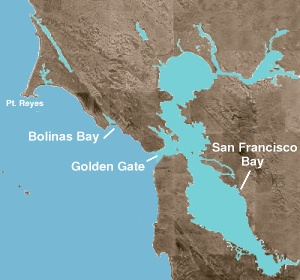
Bolinas Bay

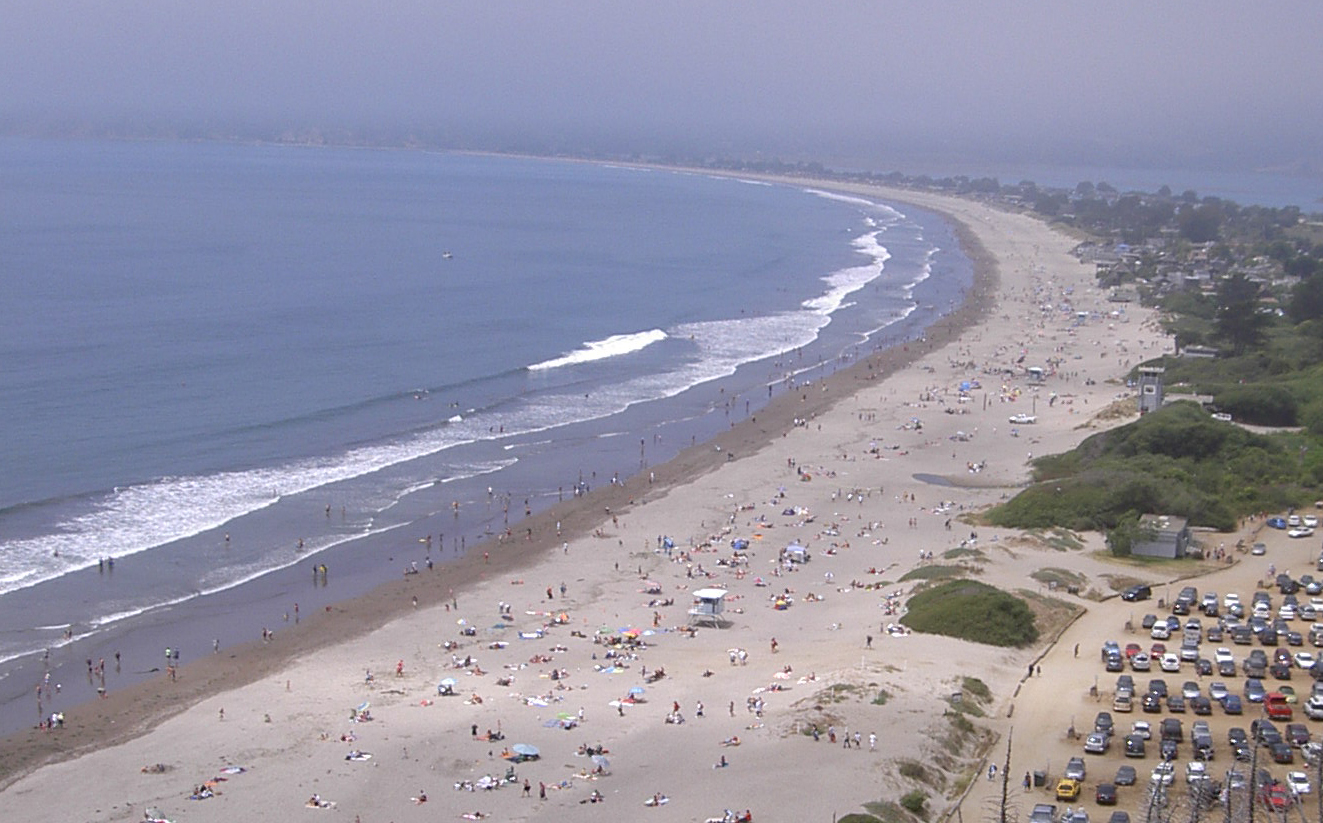
Bolinas Bay at Stinson Beach

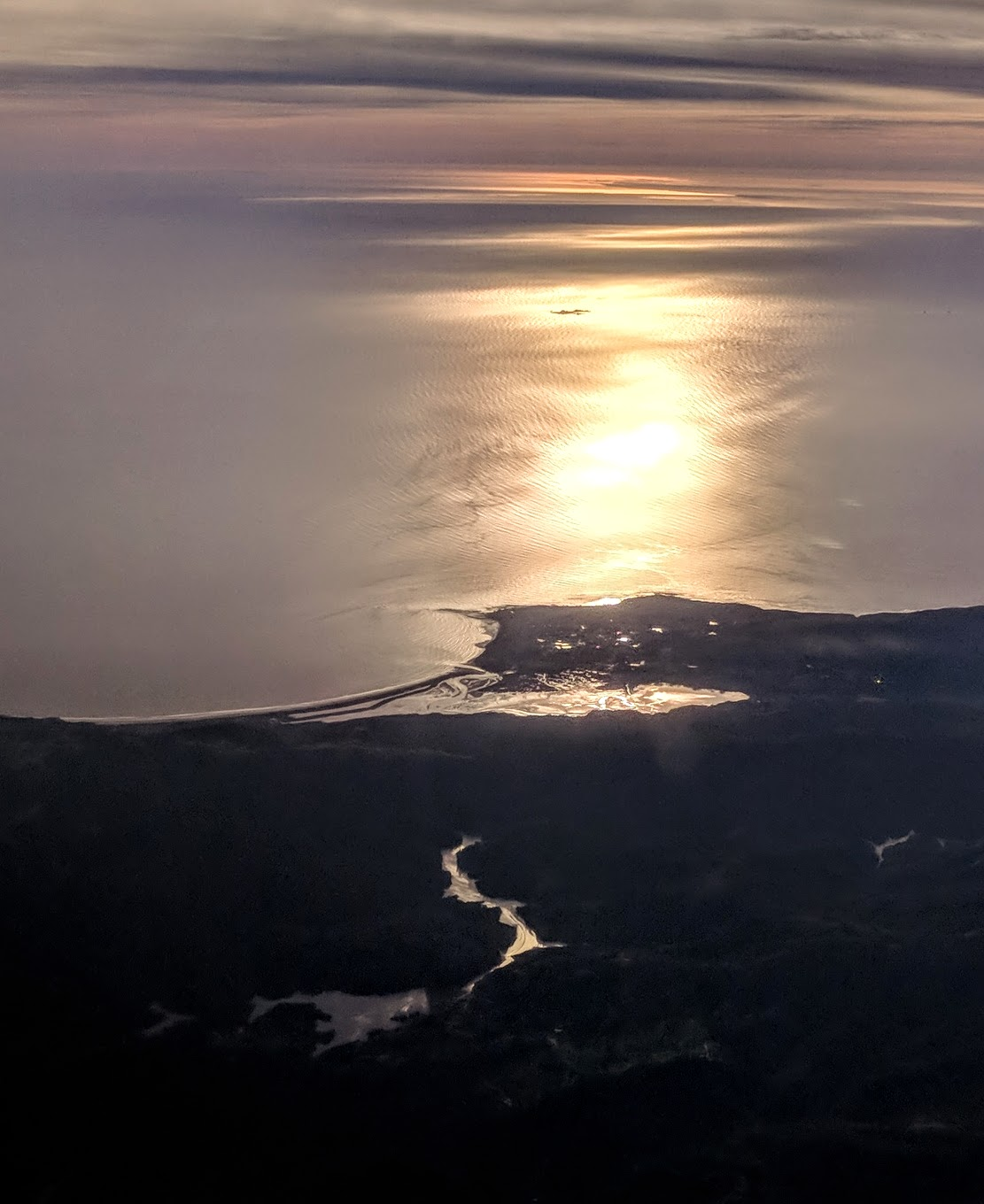
Bolinas, Bolinas Bay, Stinson Beach, Bolinas Lagoon, Farallon Islands, Alpine Lake, Bon Tempe Lake, aerial outlined by reflection of the afternoon sun

Bolinas Bay is a small bay, approximately 5 miles (8 km) long, on the Pacific coast of California in the United States. It is in Marin County, north of the Golden Gate, approximately 15 miles (25 km) northwest of San Francisco. The town of Bolinas is at its shore.

The bay is fed by Bolinas Lagoon, a large inner harbor protected from the main bay by a spit of land, known as Stinson Beach.

Along with nearby Drakes Bay, the bay is considered one of the possible landing spots of Francis Drake in 1579 during his circumnavigation of the world by sea.

== See also ==
- New Albion
- Lighter Wharf
