= Rancho Tomales y Baulines =

Mexican land grant in California

Coordinates: 38.050°N 122.760°W

Rancho Tomales y Baulines was a 9,468-acre (38.32 km^{2}) Mexican land grant in present-day Marin County, California, given in 1836 by Governor Nicolás Gutiérrez to Rafael Garcia. The grant extended south from Point Reyes Station along the Olema Valley and encompassed present day Olema and Garcia.

== History ==
Rafael Garcia (1799-1866) married Maria Loreto Altamirano in 1827. Garcia was a corporal stationed at Mission San Rafael and was the first settler to occupy the area around Bolinas Lagoon in 1834. To allow his brother-in-law, Gregorio Briones, to have Rancho Las Baulines, Garcia moved north up the Olema Valley to Olema, and was granted the two square league Rancho Tomales y Baulines in 1836. Garcia gained "juridical possession" of this land from the authorities in Sonoma. In 1843, Garcia moved his livestock onto neighboring James Berry's Rancho Punta de los Reyes. His widow, Loretta, was murdered in Olema in 1873.

With the cession of California to the United States following the Mexican-American War, the 1848 Treaty of Guadalupe Hidalgo provided that the land grants would be honored. As required by the Land Act of 1851, a claim for Rancho Tomales y Baulines was filed with the Public Land Commission in 1852, and the grant was patented to Rafael Garcia in 1883.

After Rafael Garcia's death, the remaining 3,089 acres were divided among his family.

The area is now part of the Olema Valley section of the Golden Gate National Recreation Area.

== See also ==
- Ranchos of California
- List of Ranchos of California
