= Stinson Gulch =

Valley in California, United States

Coordinates: 37°54′25″N 122°39′6″W

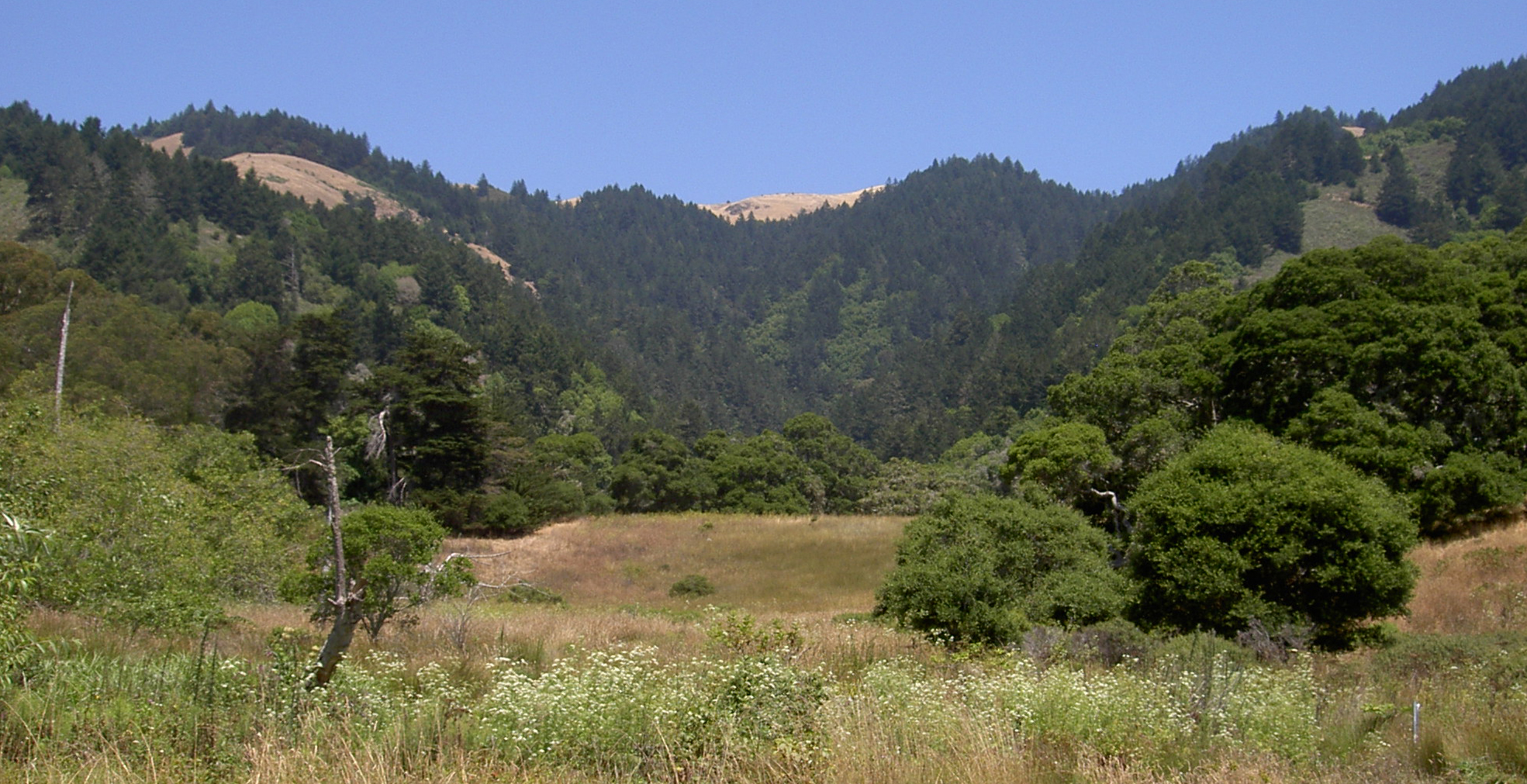
Stinson Gulch in 2009

Stinson Gulch is a valley in Marin County, California, United States which is associated with a small stream.

The stream descends the western slope of the Bolinas Ridge, crosses State Route 1 just north of Stinson Beach, California, and drains into the southern tip of Bolinas Lagoon.

Most of Stinson Gulch is included in Mount Tamalpais State Park.

The gulch and the groundwater associated with it supply most of the water for the town of Stinson Beach.

== See also ==
- Audubon Canyon
- List of watercourses in the San Francisco Bay Area
