= Copper Mine Gulch =

Valley in California, United States

Coordinates: 37°56′49″N 122°42′50″W

Copper Mine Gulch is a valley in Marin County, California, United States, which is associated with a small stream.

The stream descends the western slope of the Bolinas Ridge, passing the mine from which it receives its name, and flows through the town of Dogtown into the San Andreas Rift Valley. The creek then continues southwards and flows into Pine Gulch Creek.

Most of Copper Mine Gulch is in the Golden Gate National Recreation Area.

== See also ==
- Audubon Canyon
- List of watercourses in the San Francisco Bay Area
