= Pike County Gulch =

Valley in California, United States

Coordinates: 37°55′54″N 122°41′20″W

Pike County Gulch is a coastal valley in Marin County, California, United States, which is associated with a small stream. It is located between Wilkins Gulch (to the northwest) and Audubon Canyon (to the southeast).

The stream descends the western slope of the Bolinas Ridge, crosses State Route 1 about 3 miles (5 km) north of Stinson Beach, California, and drains into the northern tip of Bolinas Lagoon.

The gulch contains an ore vein 4 feet (1.22 m) thick containing pyrite, located a mile (1.6 km) south of the Union Gulch Mine.

== See also ==
- List of watercourses in the San Francisco Bay Area
