= Olema Valley =

Gorge in Marin County, California, U.S.

Coordinates: 37.99481°N 122.75402°W

Olema Valley is a gorge formed by the San Andreas Fault in rural west Marin County, Northern California. The valley runs from the southern end of Tomales Bay through Point Reyes Station, the town of Olema, and Dogtown, to the Bolinas Lagoon, which lies between Bolinas and Stinson Beach. It was formerly part of Rancho Tomales y Baulines and is currently part of the Golden Gate National Recreation Area.

The northern and central portions of the Olema Valley are drained by northwestward-flowing Olema Creek, whereas the southern portion is drained by southeastward-flowing Pine Gulch Creek.
