= McKinnan Gulch =

Valley in Marin County, California

Coordinates: 37.912704°N 122.663594°W

McKinnan Gulch is a valley in Marin County, California, United States.

It contains a small stream which descends the western slope of the Bolinas Ridge and drains into Bolinas Lagoon.

Near the head of the gulch is an ore vein (reported in 1955) containing chalcopyrite, galena, pyrite, and calcite.

== See also ==
- List of watercourses in the San Francisco Bay Area
