= Morses Gulch =

Valley in California, United States

Coordinates: 37.918814°N 122.671095°W

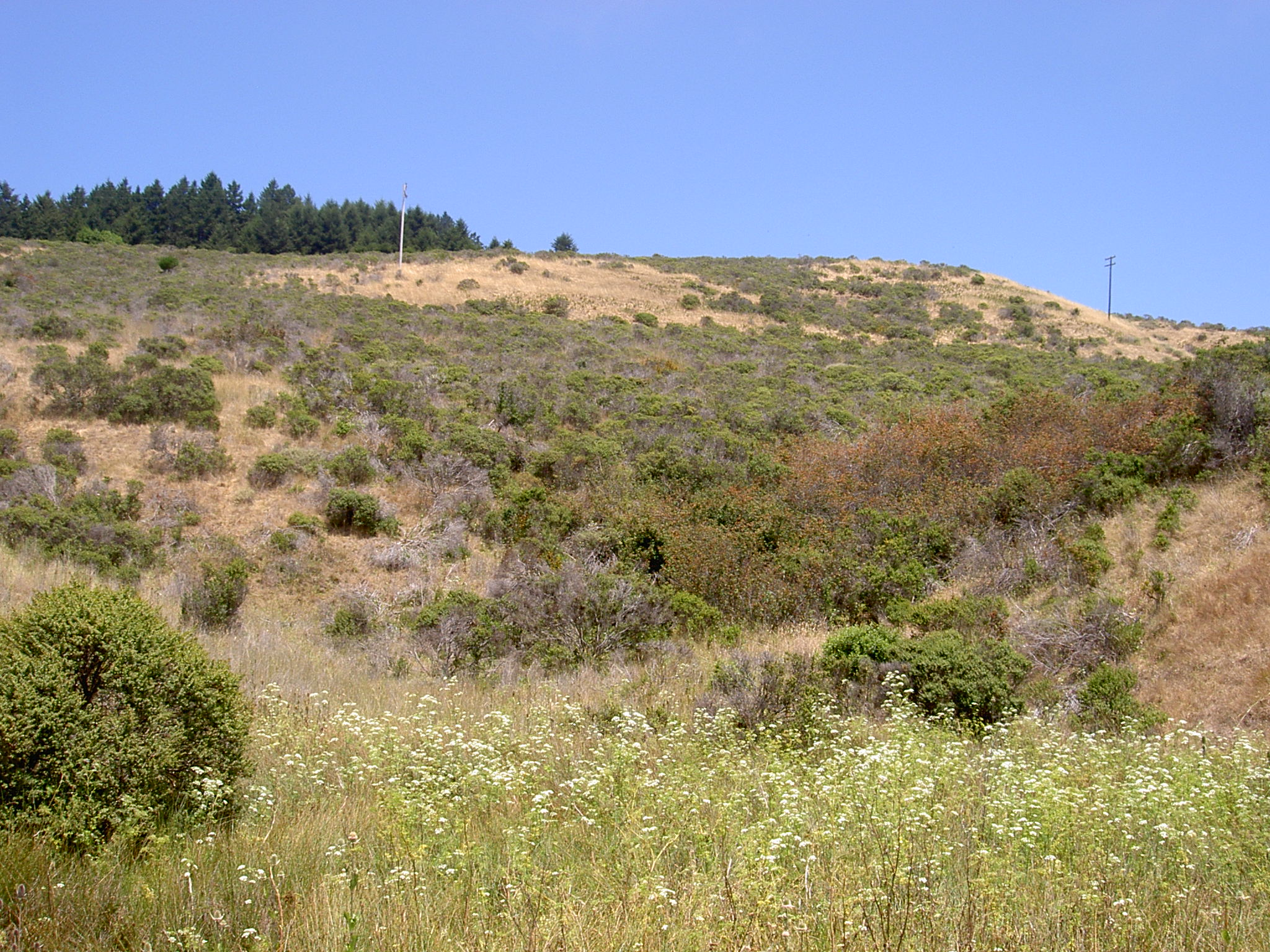
Morses Gulch in 2009

Morses Gulch is a coastal valley in Marin County, California, United States.

It descends the western slope of Bolinas Ridge and drains into Bolinas Lagoon.

== See also ==
- List of watercourses in the San Francisco Bay Area
