= Wilkins Gulch =

Valley in California, United States

Coordinates: 37°56′4″N 122°41′47″W

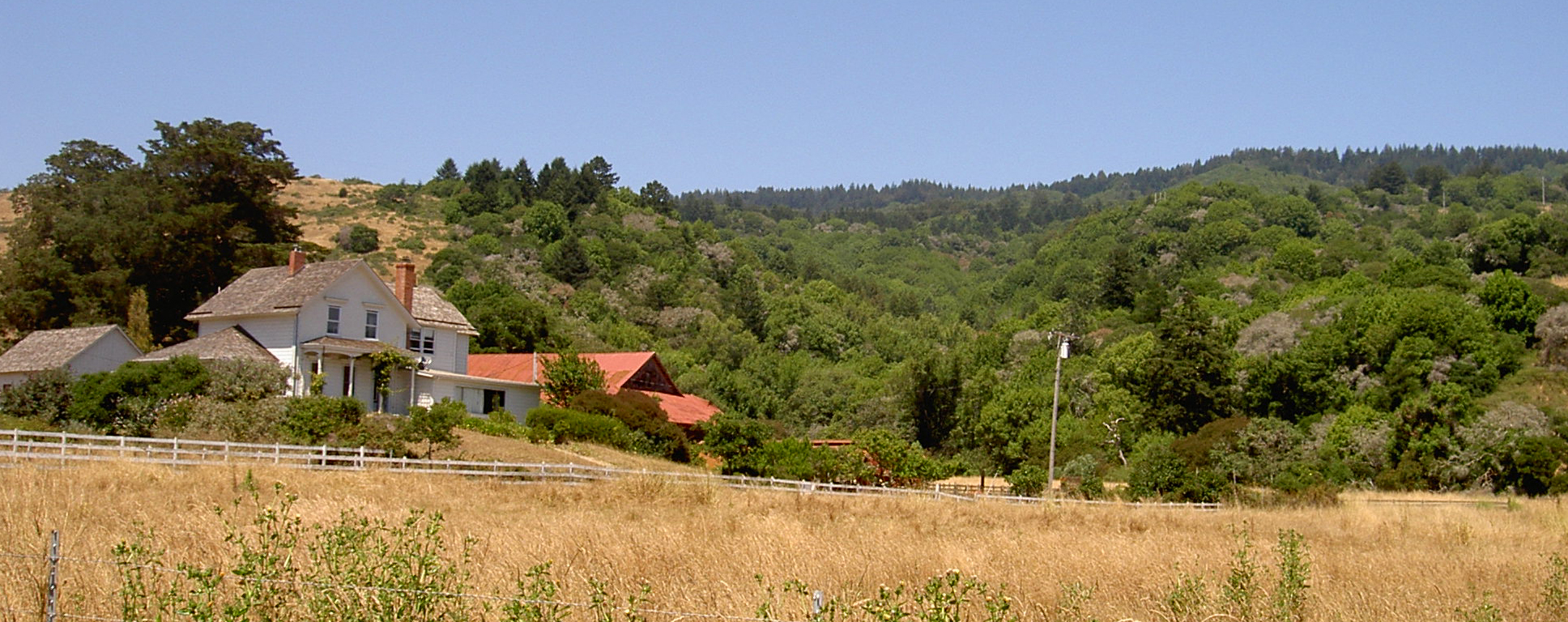
Wilkins Gulch in 2009

Wilkins Gulch is a valley in western Marin County, California, United States, located northwest of Pike County Gulch. It is associated with a small stream.

The stream descends the western slope of Bolinas Ridge, crosses State Route 1, and drains into Bolinas Lagoon.

== See also ==
- List of watercourses in the San Francisco Bay Area
