= Lighter Wharf =

Historical landmark in Bolinas, California, United States

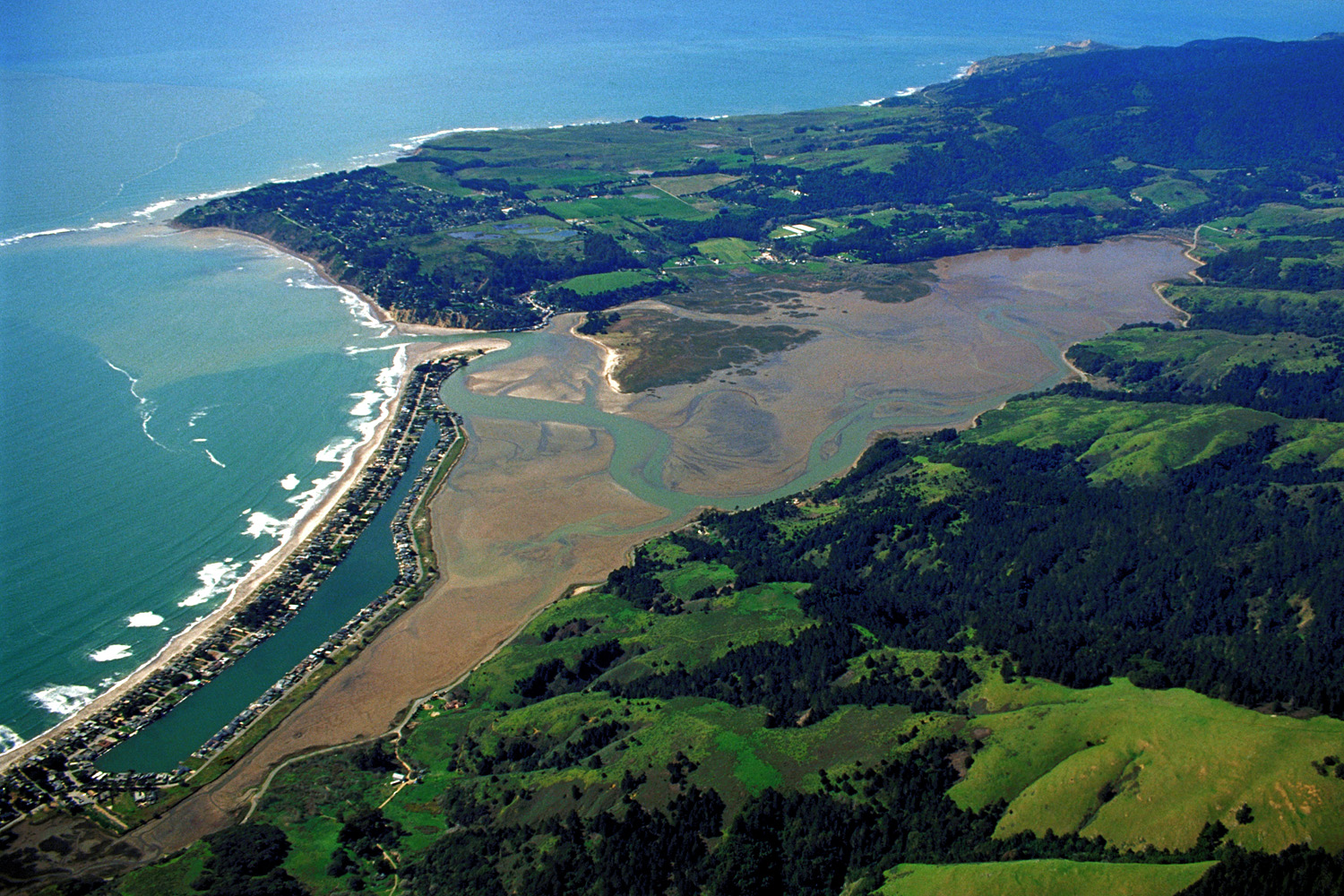
- Bolinas Lagoon. Lighter Wharf was in the upper right

- Location within California Location within the United States
- 37.93°N 122.69°W
- Location: Bolinas, California

History
- Built: 1850s

California Historical Landmark
- Reference no.: 221

Lighter Wharf was a pier-wharf in Bolinas, Marin County, California, built in the 1850s. Lumber was loaded onto lighters, then towed through Bolinas Lagoon to deeper water in Bolinas Bay and loaded onto ships. Most of the lumber was taken to the growing city of San Francisco, due to the California Gold Rush. Most of the lumber was logged from West Marin. Bolinas Port also serviced as a port for travelers to Marin County. In the summer the lighters had to align travel through the Bolinas Lagoon with the high tide. In addition to cargo and passenger piers, Bolinas Lagoon also had a few shipyards. There are no remains of the piers and wharves in Bolinas Lagoon. The Lighter Wharf was at the northern point of Bolinas Lagoon on the western bank. The site of Lighter Wharf is California Historical Landmark No. 221.

== See also ==
- California Historical Landmarks in Marin County
- Drakes Bay
