= Rancho La Purísima Concepción =

Mexican land grant in California

Coordinates: 37.380°N 122.150°W

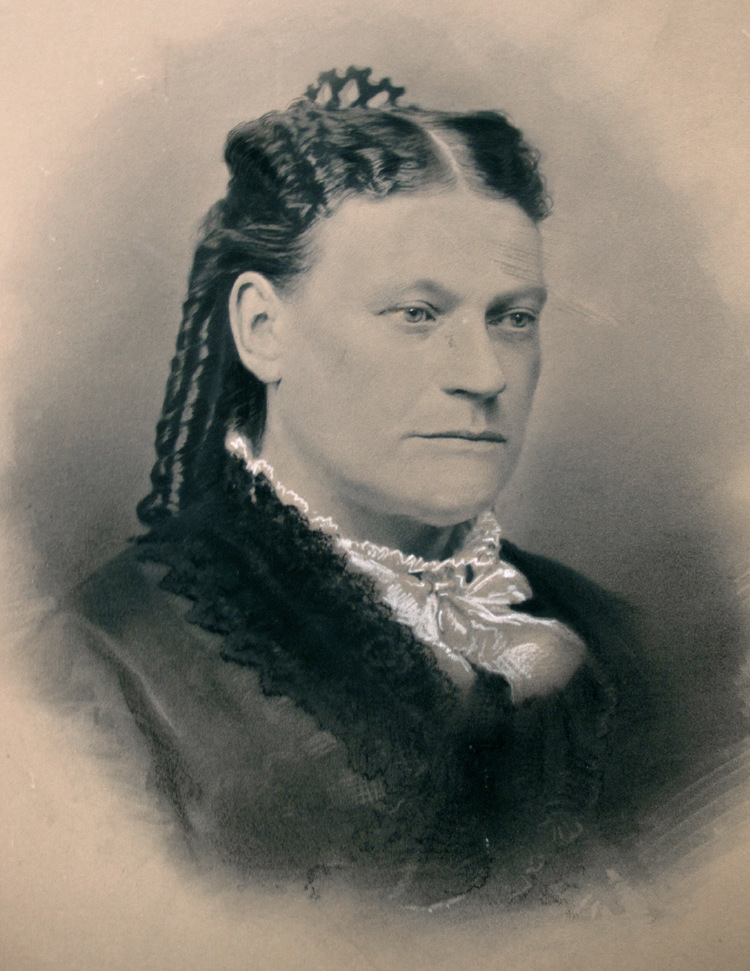
Doña Juana Briones de Miranda, considered the "Founding Mother of San Francisco, bought Rancho La Purísima Concepción in 1844.

Rancho La Purísima Concepción was a 4,439-acre (17.96 km^{2}) Mexican land grant in present day Santa Clara County, California given in 1840 by Governor Juan Alvarado to José Gorgonio and his son José Ramon, Ohlone Native Americans. The granted extended from Matadero Creek (Rancho Corte de Madera) to Adobe Creek and encompassed present day Los Altos Hills.

== History ==
José Gorgonio and his son José Ramon, were Native Americans at the Mission Santa Clara de Asís. In 1844 Gorgonio sold the one square league Rancho La Purísima Concepción to Juana Briones de Miranda (1802–1889), the daughter of Marcos Briones, who came with his father Ygnacio Briones to San Diego in 1769 and Maria Tapia, who came with her parents to San Francisco with the Anza Party. Her brother, Gregorio Briones, was grantee of Rancho Las Baulines. She married Apolinario Miranda, a Presidio of San Francisco soldier, in 1820, and later gained a legal separation. The name translates literally to "The land of the Immaculate Conception".

With the cession of California to the United States following the Mexican-American War, the 1848 Treaty of Guadalupe Hidalgo provided that the land grants would be honored. As required by the Land Act of 1851, a claim for Rancho La Purísima Concepción was filed with the Public Land Commission in 1852, and the grant was patented to Juana Briones de Miranda in 1871.

Juana Briones sold about three quarters of her rancho in 1861 to Martin Murphy Jr. of Sunnyvale, who had come to California with the Stephens-Townsend-Murphy Party in 1844. She gave the remaining 1,130 acres (4.6 km^{2}) of her rancho to her children, who bore their father’s name, Miranda.

== Historic site ==
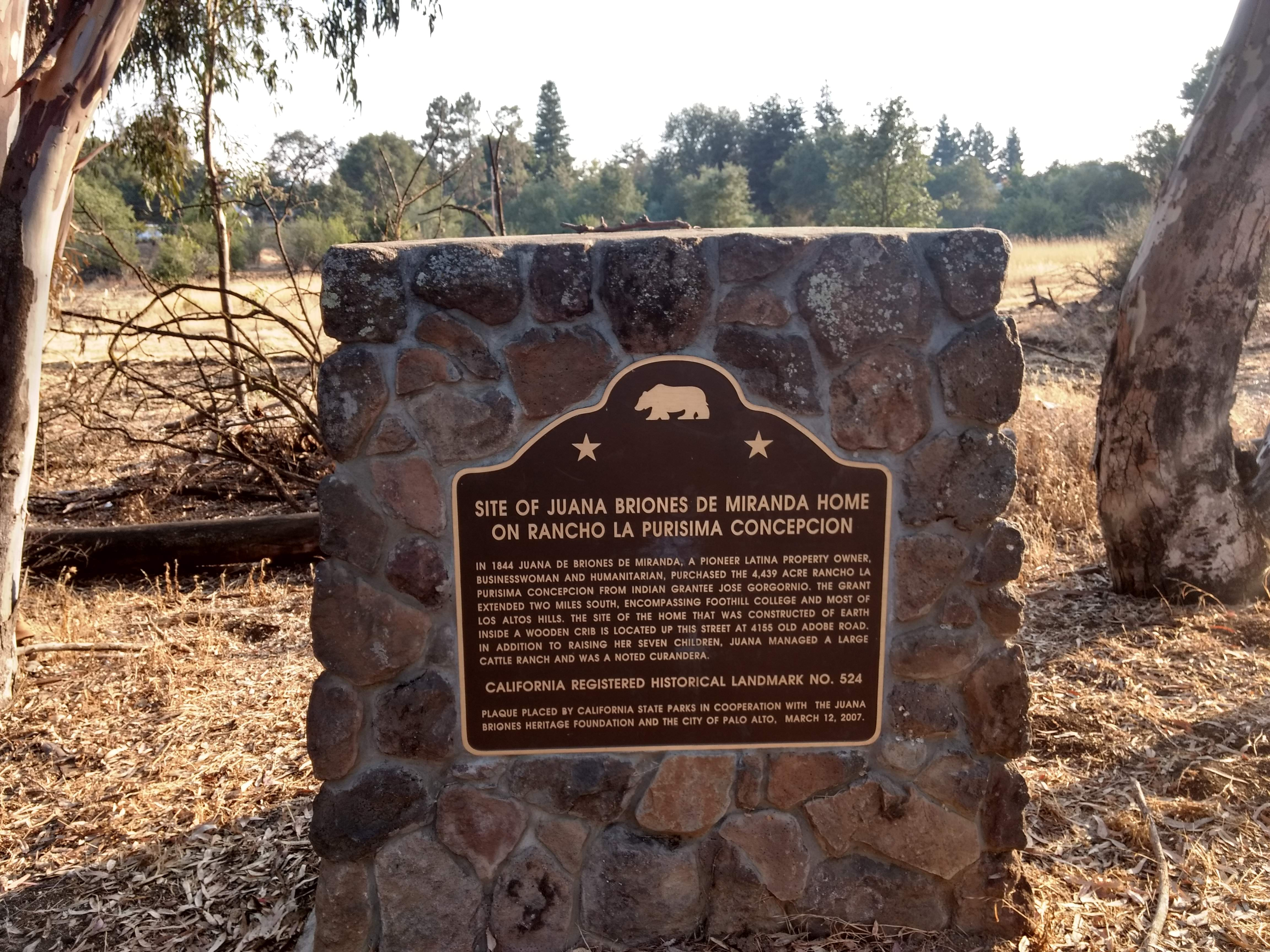
Juana Briones De Miranda Home Plaque No. 524.

The registration for the site of Juana Briones de Miranda home as a historic resource dates back to November 1, 1954. A commemorative plaque that designates this site as California Historical Landmark 524 plaque commemorating the site of Juana Briones de Miranda home on Rancho La Purísima Concepción at 4157 Old Adobe Road, Palo Alto, California. The plaque was placed by the California State Parks in cooperation with the Juana Briones Heritage Foundation and the city of Palo Alto, on March 12, 2007.

The inscription on the marker reads:

"In 1844 Juana de Briones de Miranda, a pioneer Latina property owner, businesswoman and humanitarian, purchased the 4,439 acre Rancho La Purisima Concepcion from Indian grantee Jose Gorgornio. The grant extended two miles south, encompassing Foothill College and most of Los Altos Hills. The site of the home that was constructed of earth inside a wooden crib is located up this street at 4155 Old Adobe Road. In addition to raising her seven children, Juana managed a large cattle ranch and was a noted curandera."
