= Stinton =

Stinton is a surname. Notable people with this surname include:

- Colin Stinton (born 1947) Canadian/American actor
- John Stinton (1854–1956), British painter
- Thomas Stinton (1748–1797), British college head

== See also ==
- Stinson (disambiguation)
