= Holy Cross Cemetery (Menlo Park, California) =

Cemetery in San Mateo County, California

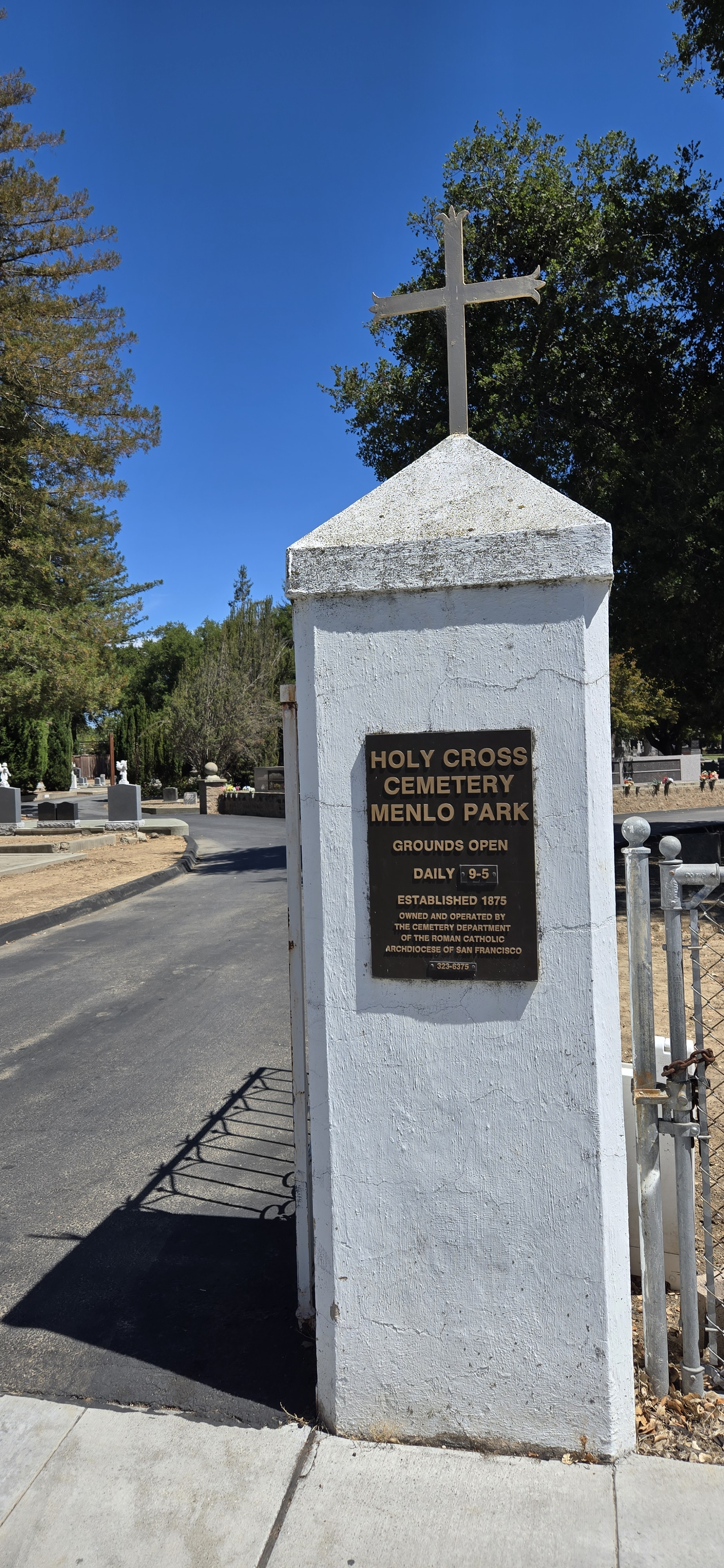
- Interactive map of Holy Cross Cemetery

Details
- Established: c. 1860
- Location: 1880 Santa Cruz Avenue, Menlo Park, California, United States
- Coordinates: 37°26′02″N 122°11′50″W
- Type: Catholic
- Owned by: Archdiocese of San Francisco
- No. of graves: 5400
- Website: https://holycrosscemeteries.com/holy-cross-menlo-park/
- The Political Graveyard: Holy Cross Cemetery

Holy Cross Cemetery, also known as Holy Cross Catholic Cemetery, is an American Roman Catholic cemetery located in Menlo Park, California, United States, established in the 1860s.

== History ==
The cemetery's oldest gravestone dates to 1860, the exact date of the cemetery formation is unknown. This had been a nonsectarian graveyard until the Catholic Church purchased it in 1872.

The initial layout and landscaping of the cemetery was completed by Irish landscaper, Michael Lynch (1847–1918) who happens to also be buried at Holy Cross. Other notable projects of Lynch included the grounds of the Flood estate of Woodside; the Timothy Hopkins estate in Menlo Park; and he worked on Stanford University's landscaping. A section of the cemetery is made of only children's graves.

In 1953, the abandoned St. Dennis Cemetery of Menlo Park had their remains moved to Holy Cross, however only 24 of the 174 bodies were moved because the rest could not be found. In the 1950s and 1960s the cemetery was reconstructed under the leadership of John Kiefer and Edwin Kennedy.

== Notable graves ==
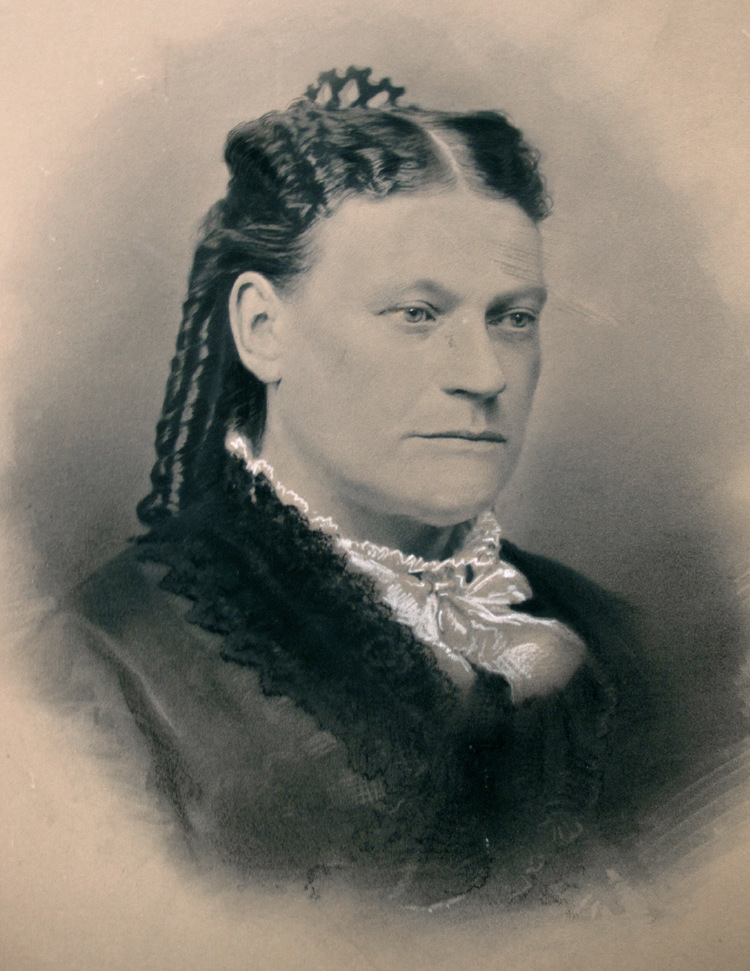
Juana Briones de Miranda, one of the many buried at Holy Cross Cemetery in Menlo Park.

Many of the early pioneer families of the Bay Area are buried at this cemetery. Notable graves include the following:

- John Beltramo (1859–1948)
- Juana Briones de Miranda (c. 1802–1889) an early Californio, settling in what is modern-day San Francisco and Palo Alto.
- Walter Jelich (1871–1949) and Mary Jelich (1880–1972)
- Elena Selby Atherton Macondray Selby (1845–1906), the child of Faxon Dean Atherton, and the widow of Frederick William Macondray Jr. (1803–1862), and Percival Walker Selby (1864–1924).
- Oscar Salvatierra (1935–2019) Stanford University doctor was that involved in the development and passage of the National Organ Transplant Act of 1984.
- Jared Lawrence Rathbone (1844–1907) was the United States Consul General in Paris from 1887 to 1891.
