= Pine Gulch Creek =

Stream in Marin County, California

- Location of the mouth of Pine Gulch Creek

Location
- Country: United States
- State: California
- Region: Marin County
- District: West Marin
- City: Bolinas, California

Physical characteristics
- Source
  - coordinates: 37°58′46″N 122°45′41″W
- Mouth: Bolinas Lagoon
  - location: Bolinas, California
  - coordinates: 37°55′19″N 122°41′15″W
  - elevation: 0 ft (0 m)

Basin features
- Tributaries
  - right: Copper Mine Gulch, McCormick Creek

Pine Gulch Creek is a 7.6-mile-long (12.2 km) south-flowing stream in western Marin County, California, United States which empties into Bolinas Lagoon.

== Course ==
The creek parallels State Route 1. Copper Mine Gulch enters from the east, then McCormick Creek enters from the west at Pablo Point. After crossing under Olema-Bolinas Road, it feeds into the west side of Bolinas Lagoon just north of the town of Bolinas.

== History ==
Pine Gulch Creek was used for generations by the Coastal Miwok Native American tribe that inhabited the areas of western Marin County for hundreds of years. Artifacts of the tribe can still be found along Pine Gulch Creek.

The Creek was home to many fish species such as rainbow trout and coho salmon, but these species disappeared mostly from the waterway after irrigation from the Creek lowered water levels. A small comeback was made by these species in 2001 and their populations have continued to grow. This is partially thanks to a campaign from the Marin County Resource Conservation District, to limit the amount of water drawn from the Creek, thus raising water levels to a safer level to foster fish life in the waterway. Local farmers have undertaken this initiative by constructing a series of ponds to irrigate their fields instead of using Pine Gulch Creek as a source of water.

== Ecology ==
Pine Gulch Creek once supported both steelhead trout (Oncorhynchus mykiss) and Coho salmon (Oncorhynchus kisutch). The salmon run, made vulnerable by overfishing, disappeared after 1968, but reappeared in 2001 and since the population started growing again, helped by new restrictions on water use from the creek. Also coho died out again by 2010, continued restoration of creek flows has led to the return of coho salmon even in 2021, after multiple drought years. Many farmers in area have switched to using rain-filled ponds to irrigate their crops, helping fish populations to rise in the waterway. These ponds also raise the water table, supporting creek flows in dry summers. The most notable of these farmers include, Dennis and Sandy Dierks of Paradise Valley Produce, Peter Martinelli of Fresh Run Farm and Warren Webber of Star Route Farms.

== Bridges ==
The only notable crossing of Pine Gulch Creek is the 42-foot (13 m) concrete slab at the Olema-Bolinas Road crossing, located 1.3 miles south of State Route 1. It was built in 1986.

== See also ==
- List of watercourses in the San Francisco Bay Area
- Point Reyes National Seashore
