= Juana Briones de Miranda =

Californian businesswoman (1802–1889)

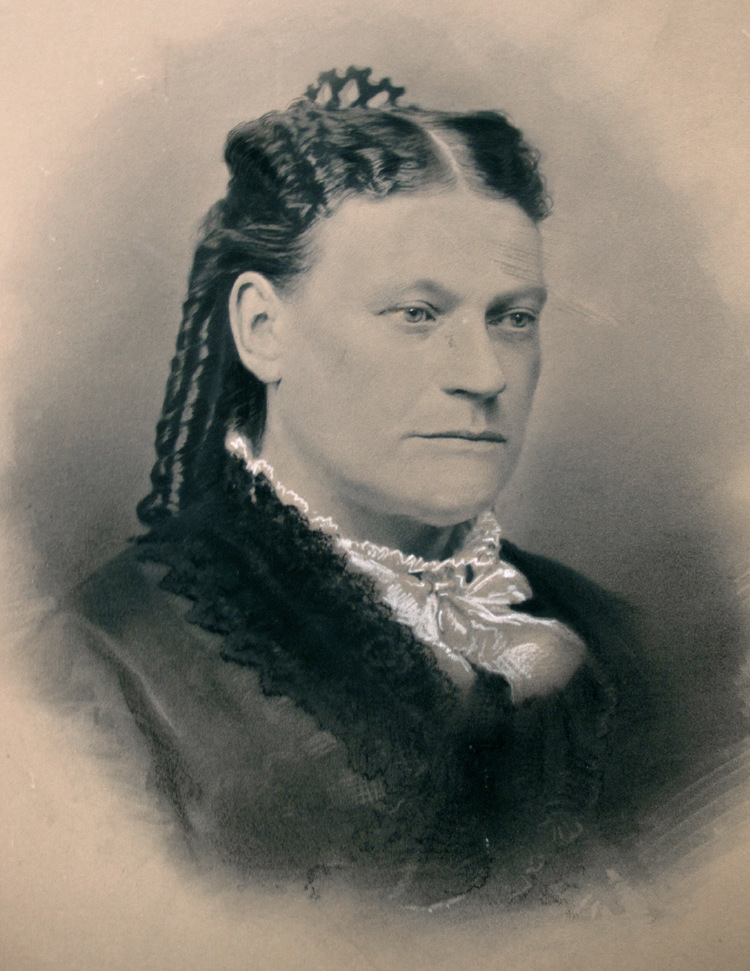
- Born: Juana Briones y Tapia; 1802; Villa de Branciforte, Las Californias, New Spain
- Died: 3 December 1889 (Aged 87); Palo Alto, California
- Resting place: Holy Cross Cemetery (Menlo Park, California)
- Other name: Juana Briones y Tapia de Miranda
- Occupations: Ranchera, Curandera, pioneer
- Spouse: Apolinario Miranda
- Parent(s): Marcos Briones; María Ysiadora Tapia

Juana Briones de Miranda (c. 1802 – 1889) was a Californio ranchera, medical practitioner, and merchant, often remembered as the "Founding Mother of San Francisco", for her noted involvement in the early development of the city of San Francisco (then known as Yerba Buena). Later in her life, she also played an important role in developing modern Palo Alto (then known as Mayfield, California).

== Early life ==
Juana Briones y Tapia was born around 1802 at Villa Branciforte near the Mission Santa Cruz. She was of a mixed-race family, which included Native American, African-American, and European descent (including Spanish). Her grandparents, parents and others of her family members had arrived in Alta California with the Gaspar de Portolà and the Juan Bautista de Anza expeditions. Her father, Marcos Briones, was a soldier posted near Monterey who later moved to the San Francisco Presidio.

In 1820, Juana married a soldier, Apolinario Miranda, and she bore 11 children between 1821 and 1841, seven of whom lived to adulthood: Presentación, Tomás, Narcisa, Refugio, José de Jesús, Manuela and José Dolores Miranda. They also adopted an orphaned Indian girl.

After establishing a farm at El Polín Spring near the Presidio of San Francisco, she bought land and built a house at Yerba Buena, the area of San Francisco today known as North Beach. A natural entrepreneur, she marketed her milk and produce to the sailors from whaling ships or those who arrived in port for the hide and tallow trade. Briones excelled not only in business and farming: her reputation for hospitality and skills in herbal medicine and midwifery were widely recognized. She trained her nephew, Pablo Briones – who was later known as the Doctor of Bolinas (California) – in medicinal arts, although she never received a formal education and could not read or write.

== Rancho ==
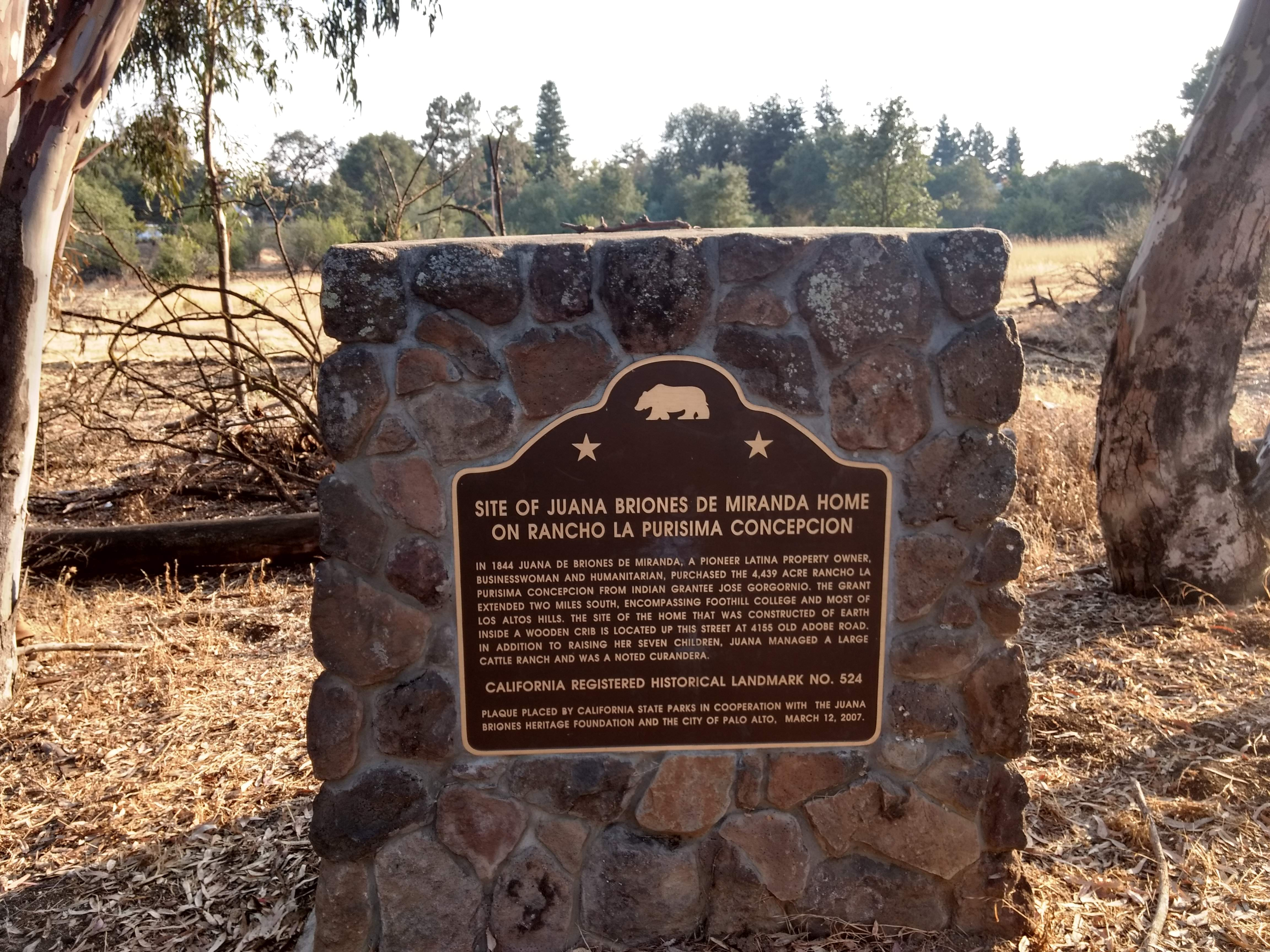
The plaque commemorating the site of the home of Juana Briones de Miranda in Palo Alto.

In 1844, Juana, who already had more than one home, gained a clerical separation from her physically abusive alcoholic husband and dropped his surname. That same year, Briones bought from two Native Californians (José Gorgonio and his son José Ramon, from the Mission Santa Clara de Asís) the 4,400-acre (18 km^{2}) Rancho La Purísima Concepción in Santa Clara County, an area overlapping present-day Palo Alto and Los Altos Hills. From the late 1850s through the 1860s, she had to fight to retain the title to her land in both San Francisco and Santa Clara counties but succeeded with the help of attorney Henry Wager Halleck. Briones sold part of the rancho to members of the Murphy family, who came to California with the Stephens-Townsend-Murphy Party. Other sections she gave to some of her children.

A portion of her rancho home remained until 2011 in the foothills above Palo Alto, California at 4155 Old Adobe Road, two blocks west of the intersection of Arastradero Road and Foothill Expressway. Although most of the house dated from the early twentieth century, two walls in the oldest corner of the home exhibited the original rancho home's construction. These walls were historically significant, as they preserved a rare construction method: infilling a crib of horizontal redwood boards with adobe. This technique provided her dwelling with the excellent insulating characteristics of Adobe while protecting that building material from erosion problems during the rainy season, and destruction by earthquake, two problems with traditional adobe construction. Other than the unusual method of using materials, the original home exhibited the familiar layout of the traditional adobe: a strip of connected rooms with an external corridor. After a long legal battle with preservationists, the house was demolished in June 2011. A section of the original wall was restored and moved to the California Historical Society, San Francisco, which opened an exhibition about Juana Briones in January 2014: "Juana Briones y Su California: Pionera, Fundadora, Curandera," presented in partnership with Stanford University, the Bancroft Library and the Presidio Trust.

== Death and legacy ==
Briones died in 1889 nearby the city of Mayfield (now part of Palo Alto, California). She is buried at Holy Cross Cemetery in Menlo Park, California.

Briones left the remaining portions of her rancho to her children, who bore their father's name, Miranda. Her memory is preserved in the Palo Alto area around where her rancho stood in Juana Briones Elementary School, Juana Briones Park, and several street names incorporating either Miranda or first names of her children. Early maps of Yerba Buena, the first settlement outside the Presidio and Mission of San Francisco, include an area labeled Playa de Juana Briones (Juana Briones Beach). She is commemorated by an historical plaque in San Francisco's Washington Square.

Stanford University classes in "Public History and Public Service" in 2006 and 2009, taught by Carol McKibben, conducted research on Briones and her Palo Alto house which led to an exhibit in the Green Library in 2010 and a Juana Briones Archive within the library's Special Collections. Stanford University history professor Albert Camarillo has done additional research on Briones and served as guest curator of the 2014 exhibition at the California Historical Society.

== Bibliography ==
Juana Briones, like many early Hispanic women of California, has been overlooked by traditional histories, but she was mentioned in the following sources:

- Bancroft, Hubert Howe (1884). History of California. Vol. XVIII. San Francisco, California: AJ Bancroft and Company. OCLC 1102337210.
- Bowman, J. N. (September 1957). "Juana Briones De Miranda". The Historical Society of Southern California Quarterly. 39 (3): 227–241. doi:10.2307/41169132. JSTOR 41169132.
- Fava, Florence M. (1976). Los Altos Hills, the colorful story. Woodside, California: Gilbert Richards Publications. LCCN 75017095.
- McDonnell, Jeanne Farr (2008). Juana Briones of Nineteenth-Century California. University of Arizona Press. ISBN 978-0816525874.
- Rindfleisch, Jan (2017). Roots and Offshoots: Silicon Valley's Arts Community. Santa Clara, California: Ginger Press. ISBN 978-0-9983084-0-1.
- Chapman, Robin (2018). Historic Bay Area Visionaries. History Press. ISBN 9781467139069.
