= Bolinas-Stinson Union School District =

School district in California

Address
- 125 Olema-Bolinas Road Bolinas, California, 94924; United States
- Coordinates: 37.916136°N 122.691901°W

District information
- Type: Public elementary school district
- Grades: K–8
- Superintendent: John Carroll
- NCES District ID: 0605520

Students and staff
- Students: 84 (2020–2021)
- Teachers: 8.5 (FTE)
- Staff: 22.5 (FTE)
- Student–teacher ratio: 9.88:1

Other information
- Website: www.bolinas-stinson.org

Bolinas-Stinson Union School District is a public school district in Marin County, California, with offices in Bolinas, California, USA. As of the 2017–18 school year, the District had 91 students at its Bolinas campus.

The district includes Bolinas, Stinson Beach, and a portion of Muir Beach.

== History ==
Bolinas School has been in continuous operation since 1858. The original wooden school-house was burned down in 1978 by an arsonist, but was rebuilt as a virtually exact replica of the original building. Until the fire, it was said to be the oldest standing school building in California.

== Staff ==
The District had 10.0 full-time-equivalent classroom teachers. The other 15 staff included 8 instructional aides or coordinators, 1 administrator, and 6 support staff. There were no guidance counselors or library staff.

== Fiscal ==
The District budget as of 2004-05 was $2,092,000, or $15,969 per student. Revenue sources were 8% federal, 81% local, and 11% state.

== Community demographics ==
In 2000, the attendance area had a total population under age 18 of 477, of which 52 (8.0%) were Hispanic.

The racial composition was

- White alone: 401
- Black or African American alone: 15
- American Indian or Alaska Native alone: 0
- Asian alone: 13
- Hawaiian or other Pacific Islander alone: 4
- Some other race alone: 23
- Population of two or more races: 21

== Student demographics ==
The majority of the students are white. Students identified themselves by race or ethnicity and by gender as follows in 2017-18:

- Asian: 1
- Black: 4
- Hispanic: 18
- White: 58

There were no students identified as American Indian/Alaskan, Filipino, or Native Hawaiian or Pacific Islander. Bolinas-Stinson is a Title I school with a School-Wide Program.

== Bolinas Stinson School ==
Bolinas School
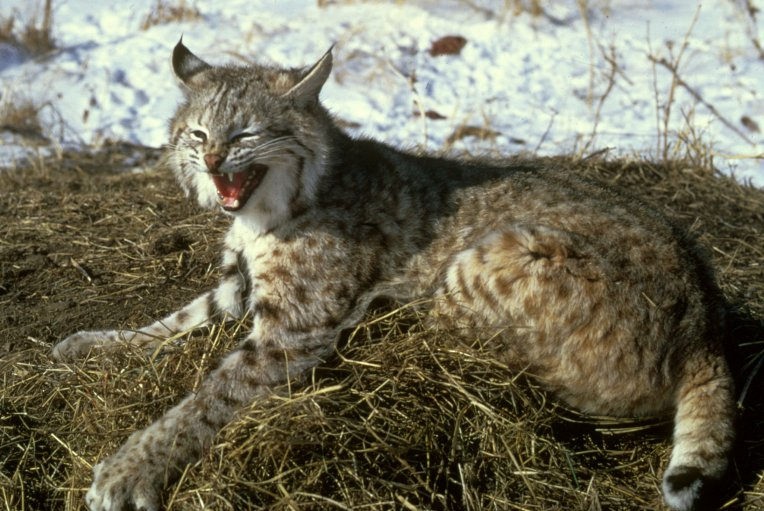

Location
- 125 Olema-Bolinas Road; Bolinas, California 94924

Information
- School type: Public, elementary school
- Principal: Michelle Stephens
- Grades: K – 8
- Enrollment: 91 (2017-18)
  - Kindergarten: 21
  - Grade 1: 8
  - Grade 2: 9
  - Grade 3: 13
  - Grade 4: 7
  - Grade 5: 8
  - Grade 6: 7
  - Grade 7: 10
  - Grade 8: 8
- Language: English
- Colors: Blue and Yellow
- Team name: Bobcats
- School Information at the National Center for Education Statistics

=== Bolinas Campus ===
Bolinas School had an enrollment of 91 students in third through eighth grade in 2004–05. With 6.0 full-time-equivalent teachers, Bolinas had a student-teacher ratio of 15.1. The campus is located approximately one mile northwest of the town of Bolinas, California, in an area known as Gospel Flats. Bolinas is neither a charter or magnet school.

=== Stinson Beach Campus ===
Stinson Beach School is located on State Route 1, one mile north of the town of Stinson Beach, California. In 2004–05, it had an enrollment of 31 students in kindergarten through second grade, with 3.0 full-time-equivalent teachers.
