= El Polín Spring =

Natural spring in San Francisco, California

Coordinates: 37.7929°N 122.45534°W

El Polín Spring is a natural spring in San Francisco, California located in the Presidio. It is the source of the central tributary of El Polín Creek (also called Tennessee Hollow Creek). The spring was used by the Ohlone people, the Spanish military, and the U.S. Army as a freshwater source. Much of the stream was channelized or placed in underground culverts, and many riparian areas were used for landfill. Beginning in the 2000s, the Presidio Trust has worked to rehabilitate El Polín spring and daylight sections of the creek downstream. In 2005, 77,000 tons of landfill were removed from Thompson Reach, a downstream section, and native riparian species were planted. In 2011, El Polín was restored, with new trails, native plants, and a picnic area installed.
