= All Hands Ecology =

U.S. nonprofit organization

All Hands Ecology (formerly Audubon Canyon Ranch) is a 501(c)(3) not-for-profit environmental conservation and education organization headquartered in Stinson Beach, Marin County, California, on the eastern shore of Bolinas Lagoon. The lands upon which ACR operates are within the ancestral territories of the Coast Miwok, Southern Pomo and Wappo peoples.

== Operations ==
Audubon Canyon Ranch was founded in 1962 to save a major heronry and block commercial development of Bolinas Lagoon in western Marin County, leading the way for the protection of Tomales Bay to the north. Today, the organization stewards a system of nature preserves totaling 5,000 acres (2,000 ha) across 26 properties in Marin County and Sonoma County and conducts conservation science that in turn informs its education programs and directs its work on some of the region's most challenging environmental issues.

AHE's conservation science program has monitored the North Bay region nesting successes of herons and egrets for over 40 years, collected long-term data sets on wintering shorebird and waterbird populations on Tomales Bay for over 30 years, and is using GPS to track the movements of individual mountain lions in the Sonoma Valley and great egrets and long-billed curlews on the coast. An experiential nature education program, established in 1970, has connected more than 300,000 Bay Area children and adults to the wonders of nature, cultivating environmental literacy and a conservation ethic. The Fire Forward program, founded in 2017, is advancing the local community's ability to use "good fire" to reduce risk and build ecosystem resilience against climate-driven wildfire events. The organization also stewards cultural treasures, including the literary legacy of American author M.F.K. Fisher at her last house at Bouverie Preserve.

The organization changed its name to All Hands Ecology in 2025.

== Martin Griffin Preserve ==
Martin Griffin Preserve
- Bolinas Lagoon Preserve
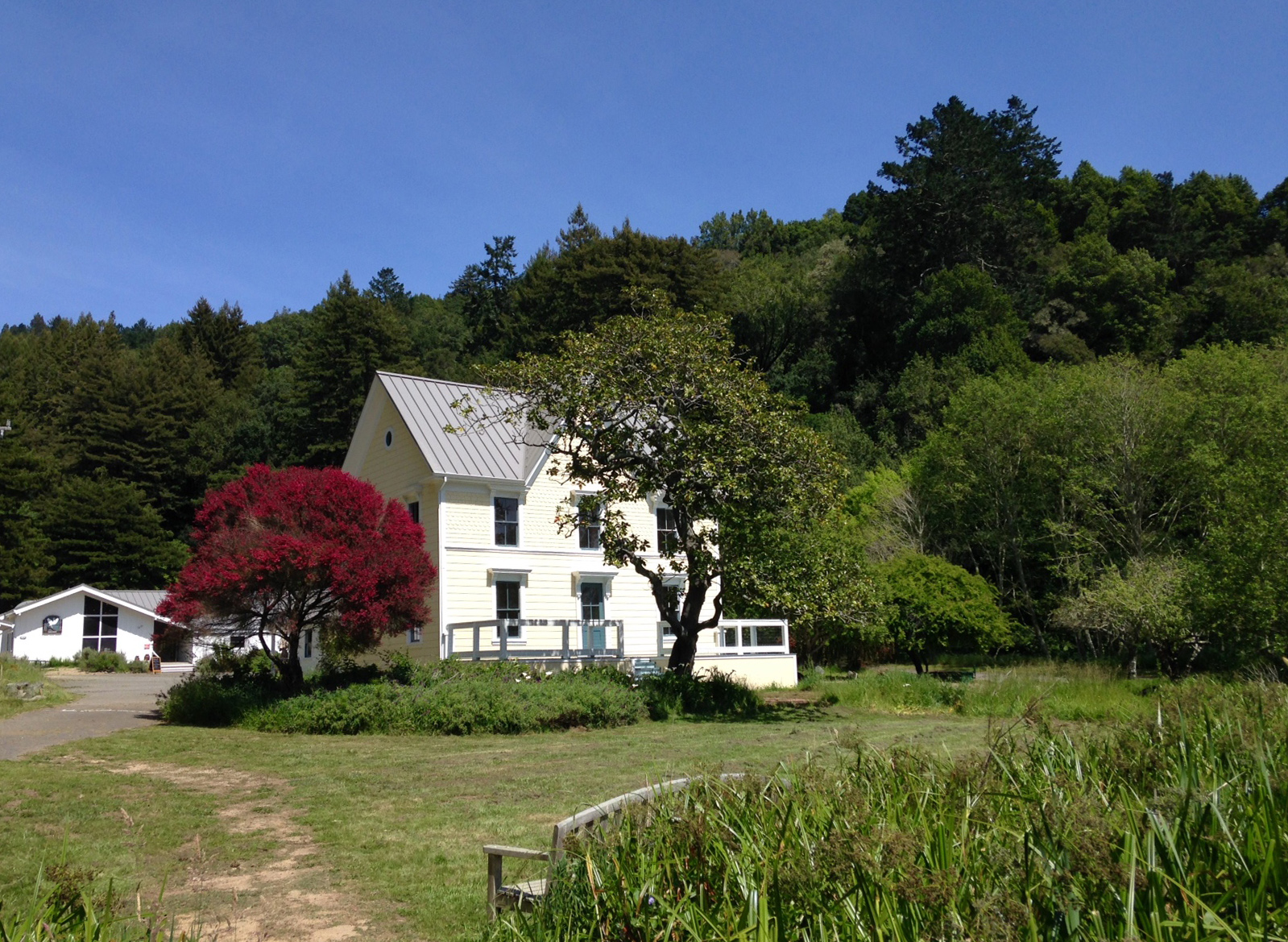
- Historic Bourne house at the entrance to the preserve

- Location within California Location within the United States
- Location: Marin County, California
- Nearest city: Stinson Beach
- Coordinates: 37.9294°N 122.6822°W
- Governing body: Audubon Canyon Ranch
- Website: www.egret.org

U.S. National Natural Landmark
- Designated: 1968

The Martin Griffin Preserve encompasses 1,000 acres (400 ha) in West Marin, protected in perpetuity since 1962 as a wildlife sanctuary. The topography is characterized by its four canyons—Volunteer Canyon, Picher Canyon, Garden Club Canyon and Pike County Gulch—which vary in maximum elevation from 1,590 to 1,720 feet, and their associated streams and watersheds.

At the Bolinas Lagoon edge, California State Route 1 borders the western edge of the property while the Golden Gate National Recreation Area surrounds the northern, eastern and southern borders.

=== The Land ===
Mixed evergreen forests blanket slopes overlooking the Bolinas Lagoon. Open hillsides support grasslands and coastal scrub, while freshwater habitats nestle in canyon floors. The preserve is home to more than twenty-five species of mammals, over ninety species of land birds, thirteen species of reptile, and eight species of amphibian.

The preserve's frontage along Bolinas Lagoon brings more than 60 species of waterbirds and shorebirds into view—from sandpipers to osprey to pelicans—as well as some of the resident harbor seals.

=== History ===
For many years a family-run dairy ranch called Canyon Ranch, the land is now protected in perpetuity thanks to the conservation efforts in the early 1960s of L. Martin Griffin (then president of the Marin Chapter of the National Audubon Society), Aileen Pierson, Stan Picher, and other dedicated volunteers who organized to purchase the property for the protection of heron and egret nesting sites. The preserve was designated a National Natural Landmark in 1968.

For over 40 years, the Martin Griffin Preserve was known as the Bolinas Lagoon Preserve of Audubon Canyon Ranch. In July 2010, the ACR Board of Directors formally renamed the site in honor of Marty Griffin's lifelong commitment to the environment and in recognition of the critical role he played in permanently protecting this section of the Marin County coastline.

== See also ==
- Golden Gate Biosphere Reserve
- Bolinas Ridge
- Pike County Gulch
- M.F.K. Fisher
