= Bolinas Lagoon =

Lagoon in the state of California, United States

Coordinates: 37.918°N 122.681°W

Designations

Ramsar Wetland
- Official name: Bolinas Lagoon
- Designated: 1 September 1998
- Reference no.: 960

Bolinas Lagoon is a tidal estuary, approximately 1,100 acres (4.5 km^{2}) in area, located in the West Marin region of Marin County, California, United States, adjacent to the town of Bolinas. It is a part of the Greater Farallones National Marine Sanctuary. In 1974, Aubrey Neasham and William Pritchard wrote in support of Bolinas Lagoon as Drake's New Albion landing site.

The lagoon is a back bay of Bolinas Bay on the Pacific coast approximately 15 mi (25 km) northwest of San Francisco. The trough in which the lagoon sits was formed by the San Andreas Fault, which runs directly through it. The lagoon is separated from the main bay by a bay mouth bar, and the sand bar that encloses the lagoon is full of beachgoers and surfers. The unincorporated community of Stinson Beach sits on the bar. State Route 1, the Shoreline Highway, runs along the eastern edge of the lagoon.

Bolinas Lagoon is on the list of wetlands of international importance as defined by the Ramsar Convention for the conservation and sustainable utilization of wetlands. Portions of the lagoon are included in Marin County's Bolinas Lagoon Open Space Preserve, and the western shore is part of the Golden Gate National Recreation Area.

The lagoon has a 16.7-square-mile (43 km^{2}) watershed; streams and canyons feeding into it include Audubon Canyon, McKinnan Gulch, Morses Gulch, Picher Canyon, Pike County Gulch, Stinson Gulch, Volunteer Canyon, and Wilkins Gulch. Kent Island is located in the lagoon.

Duxbury Reef State Marine Conservation Area lies offshore from Bolinas. Like an underwater park, this protected marine area helps conserve ocean wildlife and marine ecosystems.

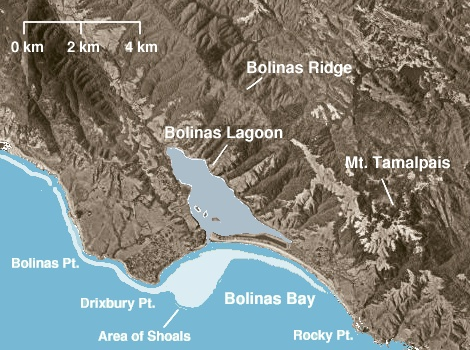
Bolinas Lagoon

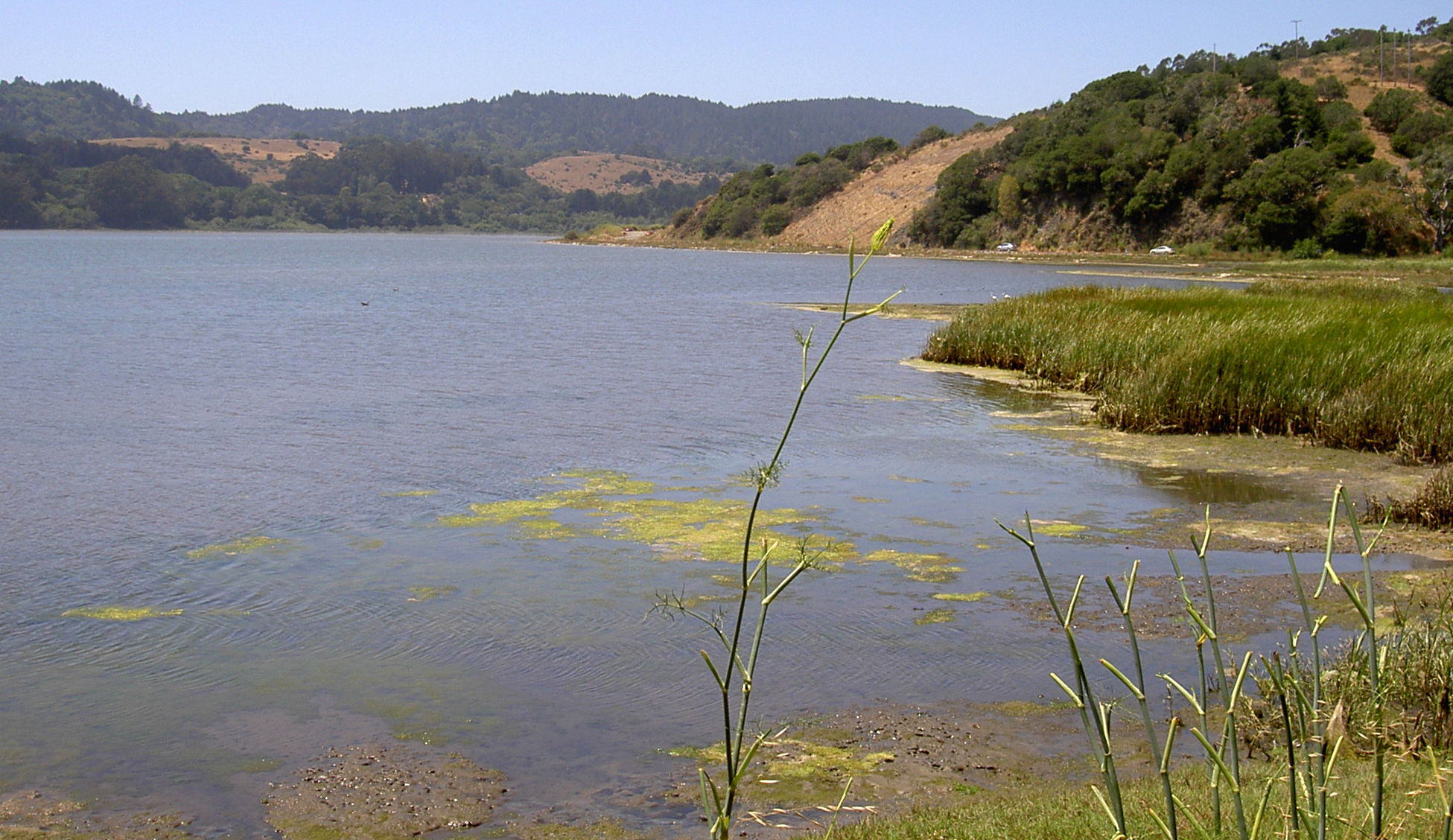
Bolinas Lagoon in 2009

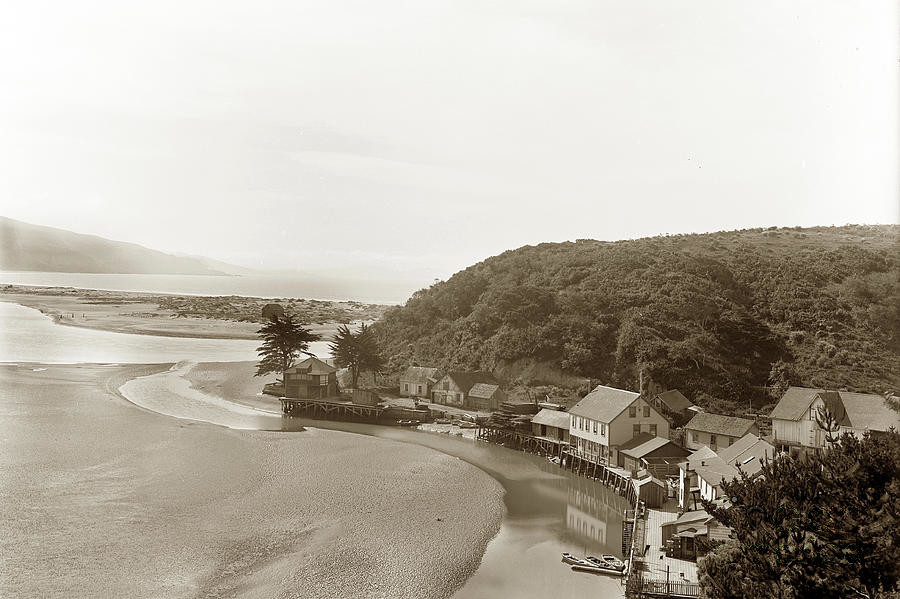
Homes by the lagoon, 1904

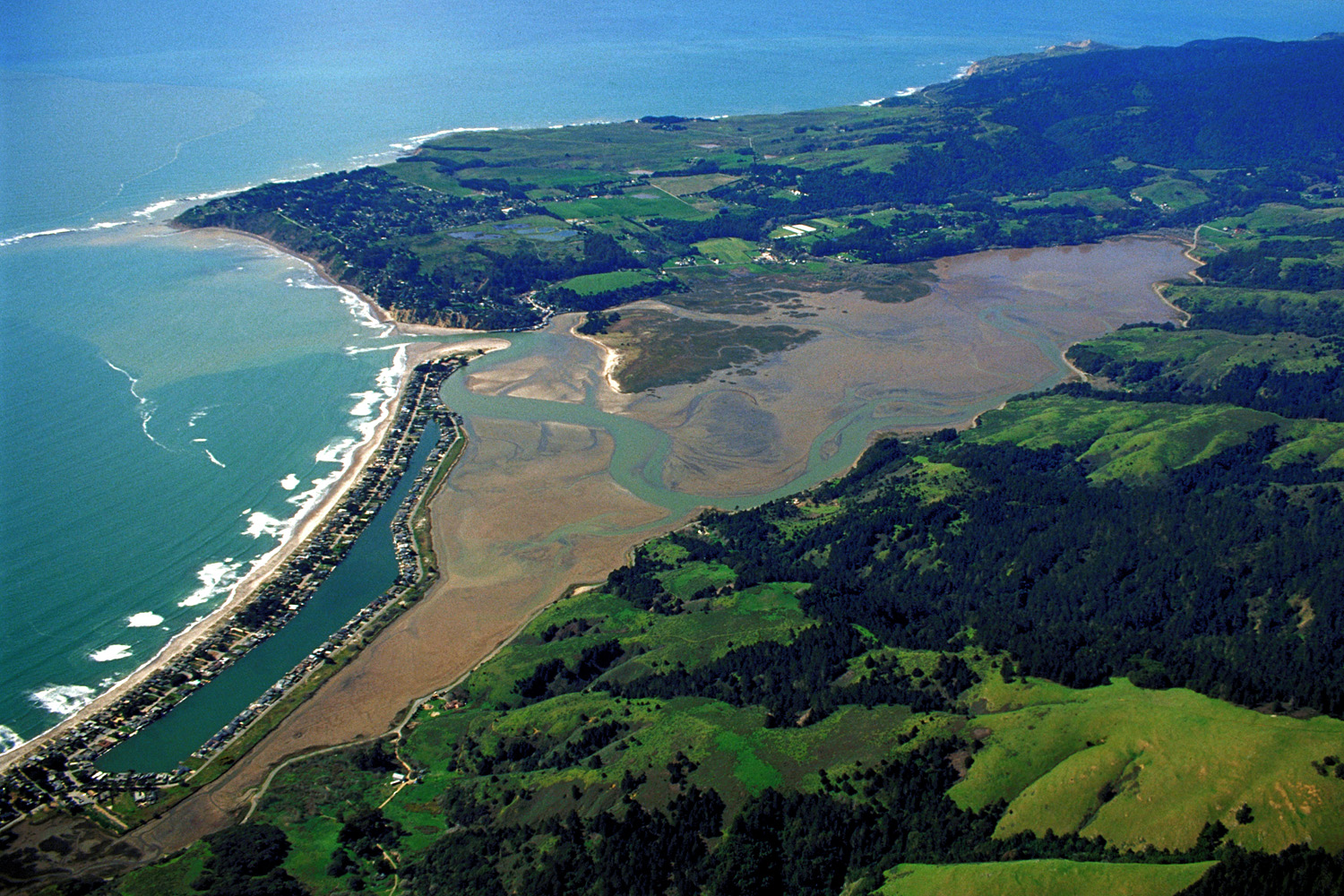
Aerial view of the lagoon at low-tide

== See also ==
- Fringe theories on the location of New Albion
- Lighter Wharf
