= Stinson Beach, California =

Stinson Beach
- Unincorporated Community; Census Designated Place
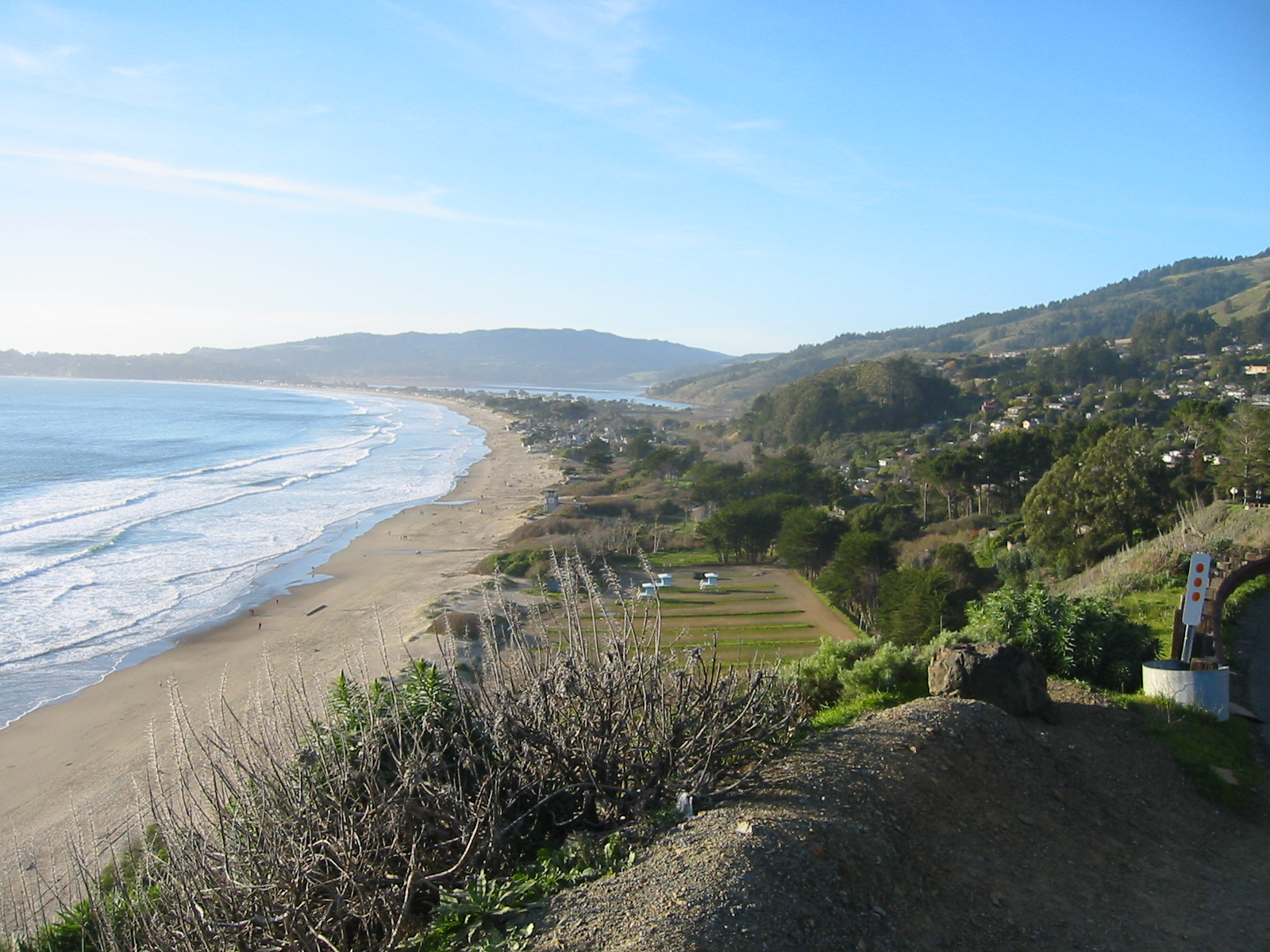
- Stinson Beach

- Location in Marin County and the state of California

- Location within Northern California Location within California Location within the United States
- Coordinates: 37°54′02″N 122°38′40″W
- Country: United States
- State: California
- County: Marin

Government
  - County Board: District 4 Dennis Rodoni
  - State Senate: Mike McGuire (D)
  - Assembly: Damon Connolly (D)
  - U. S. Congress: Jared Huffman (D)

Area
  - Total: 0.892 sq mi (2.31 km^{2})
  - Land: 0.892 sq mi (2.31 km^{2})
  - Water: 0.0 sq mi (0 km^{2}) 0.0%
- Elevation: 26 ft (8 m)

Population (2020)
  - Total: 541
  - Density: 607/sq mi (234/km^{2})
- Time zone: UTC−8 (PST)
  - Summer (DST): UTC−7 (PDT)
- ZIP Code: 94970
- Area codes: 415/628
- FIPS code: 06-74172
- GNIS feature ID: 235489

Stinson Beach is an unincorporated community and census-designated place (CDP) in Marin County, California, on the west coast of the United States. Stinson Beach is located east-southeast of Bolinas, right across the channel that terminates the bay mouth bar of the Bolinas Lagoon. at an elevation of 26 feet (8 m). The population of the Stinson Beach CDP was 541 at the 2020 census.

Stinson Beach is about a 35-minute drive from the Golden Gate Bridge on California State Route 1 (the Shoreline Highway). It is near important attractions such as Muir Woods National Monument, Muir Beach, and Mount Tamalpais.

Stinson Beach is a popular day trip for people in the San Francisco Bay Area and for tourists visiting Northern California. Although most visitors arrive by private car, Stinson Beach is linked to Marin City by a daily bus service, and the network of hiking trails around Mount Tamalpais also reaches the town. The beach is one of the cleanest in the state, and sandy, unlike the rockier neighboring beach in Bolinas.

== History ==
Prior to the European colonization of California, the area was inhabited by groups of the Coast Miwok people.

Nathan H. Stinson bought land at the site in 1866.

In 1870, the first road was built along the Pacific coast from Sausalito, and a tent settlement sprang up amongst the willow trees at the beach, which gave rise to the town's original name, Willow Camp. The Mt. Tamalpais & Muir Woods Railway opened in 1896, making Willow Camp more accessible. Visitors could ride the train to West Point Inn and then hike or arrange a stagecoach to take them to the beach. In 1906, refugees from the San Francisco earthquake came to the area and built some of the area's first businesses. Stinson Beach became the official town name in 1916, in honor of the largest landowners, Rose and Nathan Stinson.

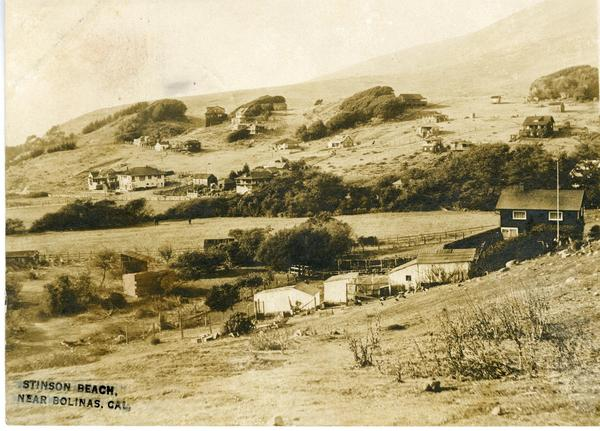
1916 photo postcard of Stinson Beach, showing Airey's Hotel to the left

The first post office was opened in 1916.

In 1939, the beach was sold to Marin County. It was transferred to the state of California in 1950, and was eventually transferred to the National Park Service in 1977.

In 1963, Merrill and Joann Grohman started the Pacific Sun, Stinson Beach's only newspaper of general circulation. It began operations in the back of a Stinson Beach's larger grocery store, Bill's Superette, in the space previously housing the Post Office. The Sun moved to San Rafael in 1966.

In 2002, a surfer was attacked by a 12-to-15-foot-long (3.7 to 4.6 m) great white shark while surfing off Stinson Beach. The young man survived, but received more than 100 stitches to close his wounds. The attack was the second in Stinson Beach, and the 13th in Marin County since 1952. In 1998, Jonathan Kathrein was attacked by a great white shark while bodyboarding. His injury from the shark bite required over 600 stitches. The surf off Stinson Beach is within an area known as the Red Triangle, where there have been an unusually high number of shark attacks.

Marin County added 12 tsunami warning signs to the Stinson Beach shoreline in 2012 to explain the risk to beachgoers.

== Geography ==
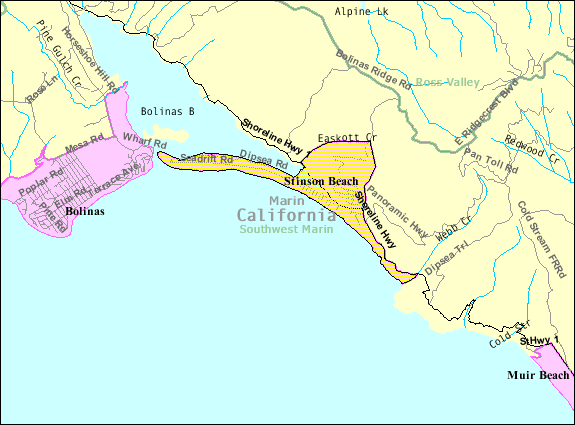
Stinson Beach census-designated place, California (yellow)

Stinson Beach is located in southern Marin County at 37°54′02″N 122°38′40″W, between Bolinas and Muir Beach. It is 15 miles (24 km) by road northwest of Sausalito and 20 miles (32 km) northwest of San Francisco.

The CDP has a total area of 0.89 square miles (2.31 km^{2}), all land.

== Climate ==
According to the Köppen Climate Classification system, Stinson Beach has a warm-summer Mediterranean climate, abbreviated "Csb" on climate maps. Like much of the California coast, summer afternoons are often cool and windy (and usually foggy) as winds blow in off the cold ocean. Adjacent sea surface temperatures are typically in the low to mid 50s F year-round. It receives more rain than other coastal cities in the San Francisco Bay Area in this latitude with 1,034.70 mm (40.736 in) of rain.

Climate data for Stinson Beach (Bolinas), California
Month	Jan	Feb	Mar	Apr	May	Jun	Jul	Aug	Sep	Oct	Nov	Dec	Year
Mean daily maximum °F (°C)	55.2 (12.9)	59.6 (15.3)	63.0 (17.2)	66.1 (18.9)	69.8 (21.0)	74.1 (23.4)	76.7 (24.8)	77.1 (25.1)	77.0 (25.0)	72.1 (22.3)	62.6 (17.0)	55.3 (12.9)	67.4 (19.7)
Daily mean °F (°C)	48.8 (9.3)	52.2 (11.2)	54.5 (12.5)	56.8 (13.8)	55.8 (13.2)	59.9 (15.5)	65.4 (18.6)	65.8 (18.8)	65.4 (18.6)	61.7 (16.5)	54.8 (12.7)	49.1 (9.5)	57.5 (14.2)
Mean daily minimum °F (°C)	42.3 (5.7)	44.7 (7.1)	45.9 (7.7)	47.4 (8.6)	50.0 (10.0)	52.7 (11.5)	54.0 (12.2)	54.4 (12.4)	53.8 (12.1)	51.3 (10.7)	47.0 (8.3)	42.9 (6.1)	48.9 (9.4)
Average precipitation inches (mm)	7.7 (200)	7.8 (200)	5.5 (140)	2.2 (56)	1.3 (33)	0.3 (7.6)	0 (0)	0.1 (2.5)	0.3 (7.6)	1.9 (48)	5.3 (130)	8.3 (210)	40.7 (1,034.7)
Source: Bestplaces.net

== Demographics ==
Historical population
Census	Pop.	Note	%±
2000	751		—
2010	632		−15.8%
2020	541		−14.4%
U.S. Decennial Census; 1860–1870 1880-1890; 1900 1910 1920; 1930 1940 1950; 1960 1970 1980; 1990 2000 2010; 2020

Stinson Beach first appeared as a census designated place in the 2000 U.S. census.

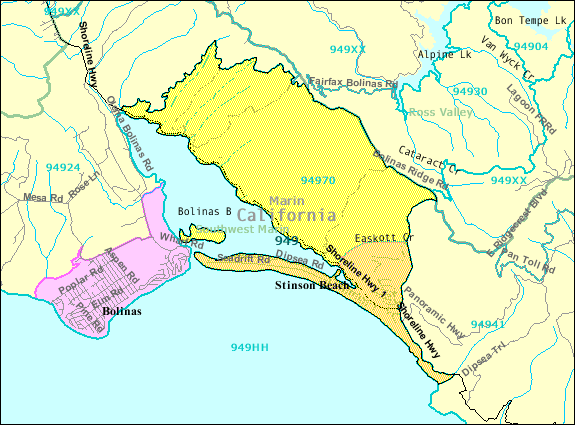
94970 ZIP Code Tabulation Area (yellow)

=== Racial and ethnic composition ===
Stinson Beach CDP, California – Racial and ethnic composition Note: the US Census treats Hispanic/Latino as an ethnic category. This table excludes Latinos from the racial categories and assigns them to a separate category. Hispanics/Latinos may be of any race.
Race / Ethnicity (NH = Non-Hispanic)	Pop 2000	Pop 2010	Pop 2020	% 2000	% 2010	% 2020
White alone (NH)	702	566	459	93.48%	89.56%	84.84%
Black or African American alone (NH)	2	3	3	0.27%	0.47%	0.55%
Native American or Alaska Native alone (NH)	1	1	3	0.13%	0.16%	0.55%
Asian alone (NH)	4	14	13	0.53%	2.22%	2.40%
Native Hawaiian or Pacific Islander alone (NH)	0	1	1	0.00%	0.16%	0.18%
Other race alone (NH)	2	4	8	0.27%	0.63%	1.48%
Mixed race or Multiracial (NH)	13	10	25	1.73%	1.58%	4.62%
Hispanic or Latino (any race)	27	33	29	3.60%	5.22%	5.36%
Total	751	632	541	100.00%	100.00%	100.00%

=== 2020 ===
The 2020 United States census reported that Stinson Beach had a population of 541. The population density was 606.5 inhabitants per square mile (234.2/km^{2}). The racial makeup of Stinson Beach was 463 (85.6%) White, 3 (0.6%) African American, 3 (0.6%) Native American, 13 (2.4%) Asian, 1 (0.2%) Pacific Islander, 15 (2.8%) from other races, and 43 (7.9%) from two or more races. Hispanic or Latino of any race were 29 persons (5.4%).

The census reported that 535 people (98.9% of the population) lived in households, 6 (1.1%) lived in non-institutionalized group quarters, and no one was institutionalized.

There were 290 households, out of which 31 (10.7%) had children under the age of 18 living in them, 116 (40.0%) were married-couple households, 18 (6.2%) were cohabiting couple households, 97 (33.4%) had a female householder with no partner present, and 59 (20.3%) had a male householder with no partner present. 124 households (42.8%) were one person, and 76 (26.2%) were one person aged 65 or older. The average household size was 1.84. There were 146 families (50.3% of all households).

The age distribution was 36 people (6.7%) under the age of 18, 27 people (5.0%) aged 18 to 24, 92 people (17.0%) aged 25 to 44, 162 people (29.9%) aged 45 to 64, and 224 people (41.4%) who were 65 years of age or older. The median age was 60.4 years. For every 100 females, there were 89.2 males.

There were 751 housing units at an average density of 841.9 units per square mile (325.1 units/km^{2}), of which 290 (38.6%) were occupied. Of these, 195 (67.2%) were owner-occupied, and 95 (32.8%) were occupied by renters.

=== 2010 ===
The 2010 United States census reported that Stinson Beach had a population of 632. The population density was 433.1 inhabitants per square mile (167.2/km^{2}). The racial makeup of Stinson Beach was 582 (92.1%) White, 3 (0.5%) African American, 8 (1.3%) Native American, 14 (2.2%) Asian, 1 (0.2%) Pacific Islander, 9 (1.4%) from other races, and 15 (2.4%) from two or more races. Hispanic or Latino of any race were 33 persons (5.2%).

The Census reported that 629 people (99.5% of the population) lived in households, 3 (0.5%) lived in non-institutionalized group quarters, and 0 (0%) were institutionalized.

There were 339 households, out of which 50 (14.7%) had children under the age of 18 living in them, 134 (39.5%) were opposite-sex married couples living together, 14 (4.1%) had a female householder with no husband present, 10 (2.9%) had a male householder with no wife present. There were 26 (7.7%) unmarried opposite-sex partnerships, and 8 (2.4%) same-sex married couples or partnerships. 147 households (43.4%) were made up of individuals, and 45 (13.3%) had someone living alone who was 65 years of age or older. The average household size was 1.86. There were 158 families (46.6% of all households); the average family size was 2.54.

The population was spread out, with 76 people (12.0%) under the age of 18, 26 people (4.1%) aged 18 to 24, 117 people (18.5%) aged 25 to 44, 278 people (44.0%) aged 45 to 64, and 135 people (21.4%) who were 65 years of age or older. The median age was 54.4 years. For every 100 females, there were 94.5 males. For every 100 females age 18 and over, there were 95.1 males.

There were 773 housing units at an average density of 529.8 per square mile (204.6/km^{2}), of which 209 (61.7%) were owner-occupied, and 130 (38.3%) were occupied by renters. The homeowner vacancy rate was 2.3%; the rental vacancy rate was 9.7%. 425 people (67.2% of the population) lived in owner-occupied housing units and 204 people (32.3%) lived in rental housing units.

=== 2000 ===
As of the census of 2000, the median income for a household in the CDP was $87,679, and the median income for a family was $105,827. Males had a median income of $58,750 versus $56,875 for females. The per capita income for the CDP was $62,452. About 3.8% of families and 5.1% of the population were below the poverty line, including 11.8% of those under the age of eighteen and 10.4% of those 65 or over.

== Education ==
Stinson Beach is in the Bolinas-Stinson Union School District, the Tamalpais Union High School District, and the Marin Community College District. Students in primary grades (K-2) attend Stinson Beach School, while elementary grade students (grades 3–8) attend Bolinas School. Stinson Beach is in the attendance area of Tamalpais High School, in Mill Valley.

== Government ==
Stinson Beach is unincorporated, receiving general government services from Marin County, including law enforcement, land use planning, library, public health, and code enforcement. Three special districts provide local services. The Stinson Beach County Water District provides water and septic tank maintenance service and contracts for garbage and recycling collection. The Stinson Beach Volunteer Fire Protection District provides fire protection, emergency medical care, and disaster management services. The Marin County Flood Control and Water Conservation District administers programs which aim to mitigate flooding, historically concentrating on issues related to the flooding of Easkoot Creek.

== Community organizations ==
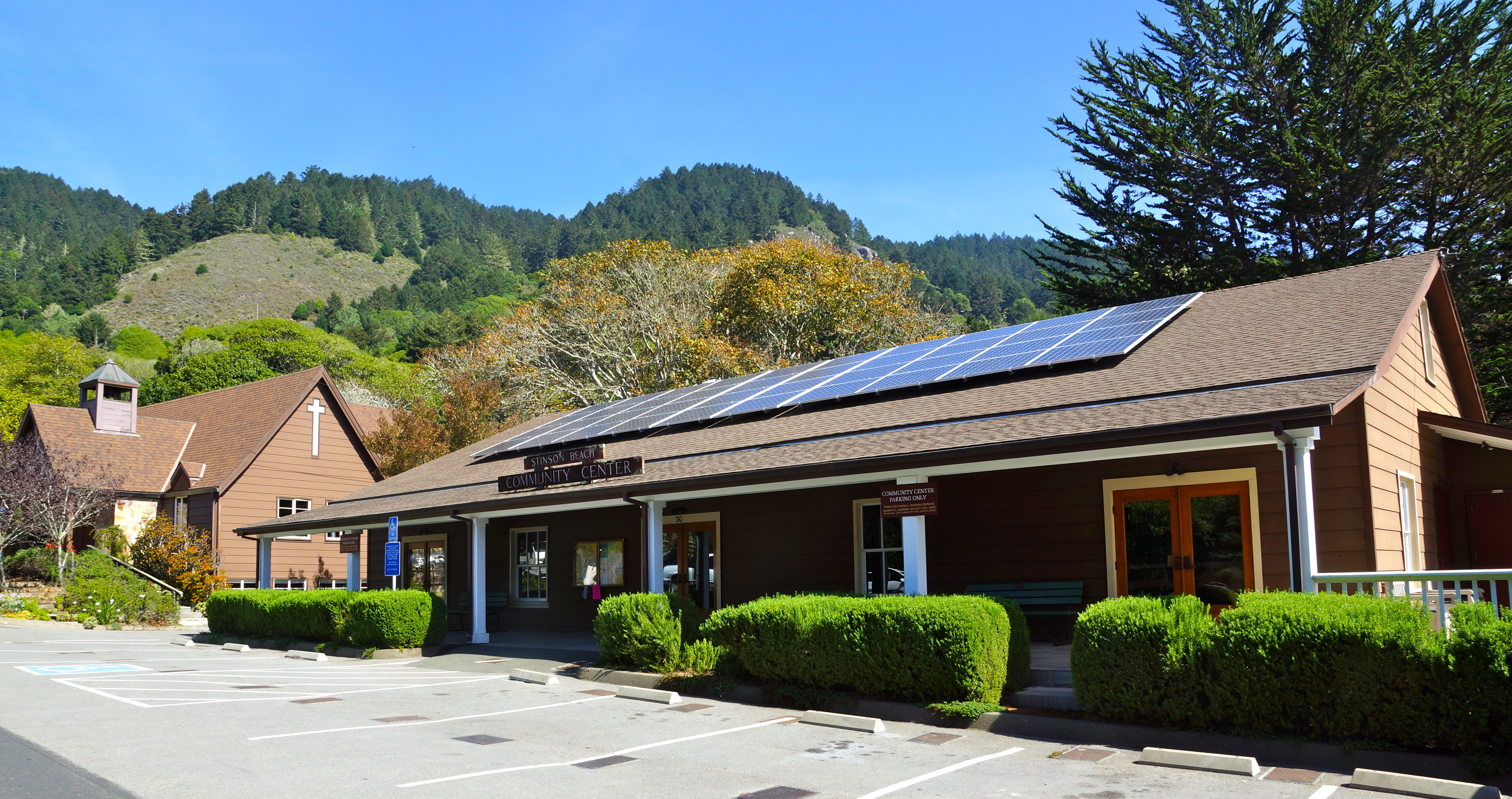
Church and Community Center

The Stinson Beach Village Association was formed in 1976 to represent the town as the County developed the first Stinson Beach Community Plan. The Village Association's current elected president is village resident Michael Matthews. Previously, development of the town had been promoted by the Stinson Beach Progressive Club, one of several non-profit organizations that formed the board of the Stinson Beach Community Center. The other founding organizations were the Allied Arts Club, the Stinson Beach Community Church, The Volunteer Fire Department, and the Parent-Teachers Club. The Community Center complex on Belvedere Avenue includes the Fire House, which fronts on Shoreline Highway, the Community Center, and the chapel. The land was donated by the FitzHenrys and the other heirs of the Stinson families.

== Regional recreation areas ==
- All Hands Ecology (formerly Audubon Canyon Ranch)
- Golden Gate National Recreation Area
- Mount Tamalpais State Park
- Point Reyes National Seashore

== Annual events ==
On the second Sunday of June, the town serves as the ending point for the annual running of the Dipsea Race, the second-oldest footrace in the U.S. The California Road Club holds its Mount Tamalpais Hill Climb, one of the oldest bicycle races in the West, in early fall. Since 2002, the race has been held on the third Saturday of the month, with about 400 bicyclists competing in the 12.5-mile (20.1 km) road race from Stinson to the head of Bolinas Lagoon and on to the West summit of Mount Tamalpais at Rock Spring.

"Cuisine on the Green" is a yearly event held in the town's central park, the Village Green, each May. It features local restaurants and merchants selling a wide variety of foods, trinkets, clothing, art, and novelty items at different booths. Talent local to the area often performs on the small park stage. Cuisine on the Green benefits the Stinson Beach Community Center.

On July 4 of every year, a "tug-of-war" is held with Bolinas across the inlet dividing the two communities. Thirty women from each shore pull against each other until a winner is declared, and then 30 men from each take their turn.

== Notable people ==
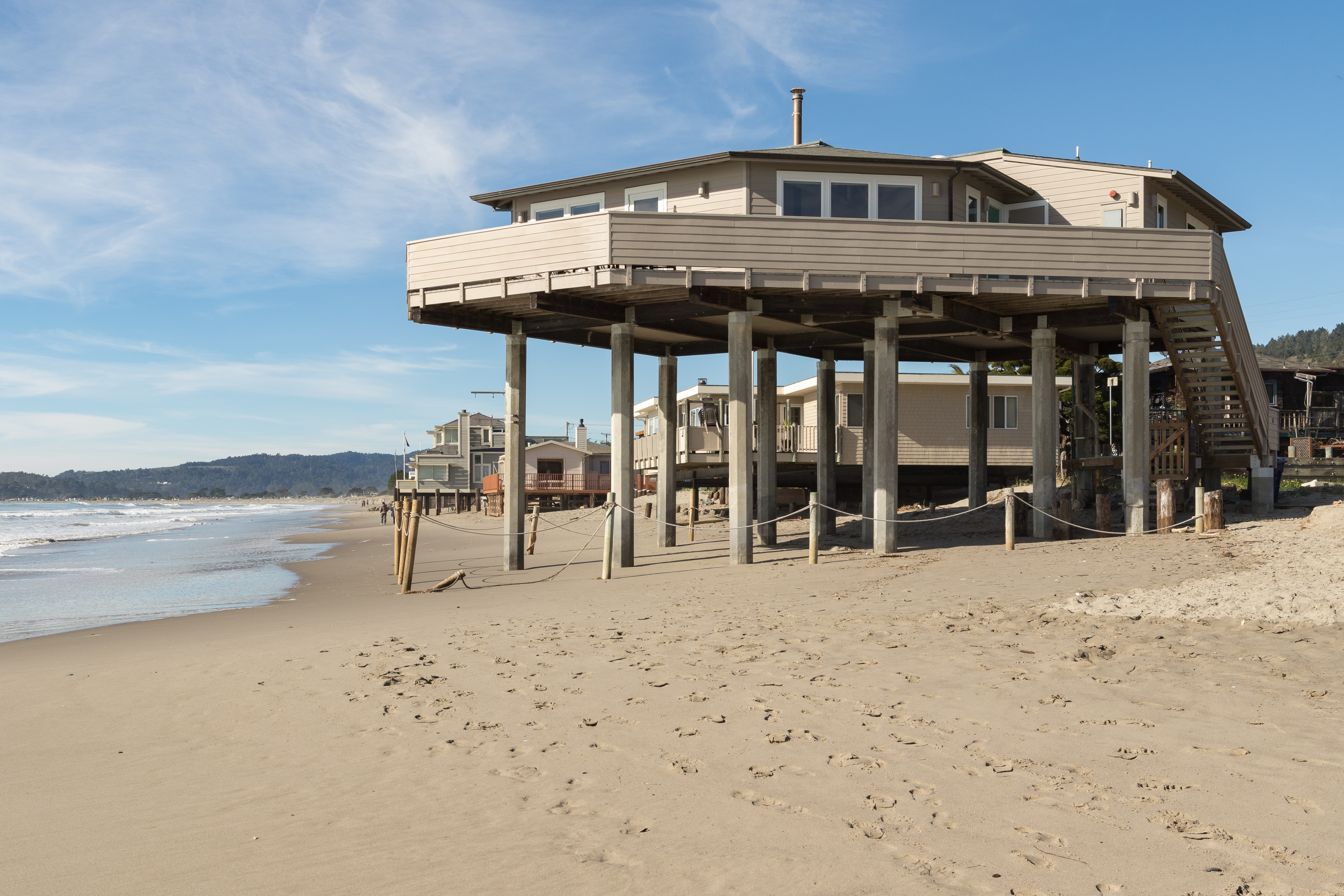
House on stilts in Stinson Beach

Residents, landowners, and summer people important in the development, life, and culture of Stinson Beach. Arrival or tenure is shown in square brackets. Birth and death dates are shown in parentheses.

- Rafael Garcia [1836–1846], first settler on Bolinas Lagoon.
- Gregorio (1791–May 10, 1863) and Ramona Garcia Briones (1793/4–June 23, 1901), received the Rancho Las Baulines Mexican land grant on February 11, 1846; after being widowed, Ramona married Benancio Munos when she was almost 80; when she died at the age of 107, Ramona Garcia Munos was believed to be the oldest woman in California.
- Pablo Briones [1837–?], with his uncle, Rafael Garcia, managed the Rancho for his parents, Gregorio and Ramona; trained as curandero by his aunt, Juana Briones de Miranda; settled in Bolinas.
- Captain Isaac Morgan [c. 1851–?], purchased the portion of Rancho Las Baulines east of Bolinas Lagoon in 1852; on this property, called Belvidere Ranch and which was to become Stinson Beach, he grew apples, cut wood, built boats, and had a dairy farm; in 1866, as lead partner in the Morgan Land Company, purchased the Page Tract, which ran from Belvidere Ranch to Dogtown and which became the Bourne and Wilkins Ranches.
- Nathan and Rose Stinson [1870s–?], established first campground at Willow Camp.
- Captain Alfred Easkoot [1870s–], Marin County surveyor; founder of second campground.; member of Duxbury Grove No. 26, UAOD
- Thaddeus Welch (1844–1919) and Ludmila Pilat Welch (1867–1925) [1896–1905], American painters
- William Kent (March 29, 1864 – March 13, 1928) United States Congressman; donor of the land for the Muir Woods National Monument; owner of the beach and tidelands that became Seadrift.
- Newman Lee Fitzhenry (1881–November 20, 1938) [c. 1913–1938], BS, University of Chicago, 1905; married Eve Stinson and pursued real estate and resort development; suicided November 20, 1938.
- William Kent Jr., began the development of the Seadrift subdivision in the 1950s.
- Mildred Sadler (May 16, 1905 – February 18, 2004) (1926–2004), Principal, Stinson Beach School, 1926–1967.
- Landis Everson (1960s), poet and painter.
- George Hunter White, also known as Colonel White (1965–1975) (died October 23, 1975), Federal Bureau of Narcotics agent and District Supervisor, retired; OSS Counter-Intelligence Director during WWII; led Project MKULTRA in Boston and Operation Midnight Climax in New York and San Francisco brothels (or "safehouses") until the closure of the San Francisco facilities in 1965; Fire Marshall, Stinson Beach Fire Department
- Elmer Collett (1966–present), former professional football player for the 49ers and the Colts
- Peter Bishop Allen (November 1, 1943 – June 3, 2004) (c. 1967–2004), sculptor of marine mammals; Assistant Chief, Stinson Beach Fire Department; founder of The Kids Camp nature education program
- Steve Miller (1960s–1970s), musician
- Jerry Garcia (1970s), musician
- Carolyn Garcia, also known as Mountain Girl (1970s), member of Merry Pranksters, wife of Jerry Garcia
- Keith and Donna Godchaux (1970s), musicians
- Ednah Root (1980s), painter, textile artist, sculptor, philanthropist, and arts patron
- Peter Rowan (1970s), musician
- Richard Jencks, former President of CBS.
- The Rowan Brothers – Lorin and Chris Rowan (1970s), musicians
- David Grisman (1970s), musician
- George Frayne (born c. 1946) (c. 1973–1997), musician, founder (Commander Cody and His Lost Planet Airmen) and artist; Frayne referred to Stinson Beach as "formerly the grooviest place on earth" working in his converted garage/studio on 17 Calle Del Embarcadero.
- Joseph Esherick (1987), famed architect; designed a home on 268 Seadrift Road.
- James Grant (1924–1997) (c. 1980–1997), painter and sculptor; the art exhibit wall at the Stinson Beach Branch Library is named in his honor
- Jerry Cebe (August 10, 1940 - Sep 1, 2017), artist (abstract painting; art glass)
- Klaus Kinski (1926–1991), famed German actor who died just north in Lagunitas

== In popular culture ==
Stinson Beach has been the setting and filming location for several movies, including:

- Play It Again, Sam
- The Fog
- Memoirs of an Invisible Man
- The Invisible Man (2020 film); this adaptation is unrelated to the novel & film listed above.
- Basic Instinct
- On The Edge
- Shoot The Moon
- The Crazy-Quilt (1966 John Korty Film)
- America Is Still the Place

The town was mentioned in an episode of M*A*S*H—"The Merchant of Korea". In the episode, BJ borrows $200 from Charles to wire home to his wife as a down payment on the purchase of a one-acre lot with "trees, the beach, a view of San Francisco...everything!"

George Frayne (Commander Cody) wrote a song about Stinson Beach entitled "Midnight on The Strand". It was recorded on his 1987 album, Let's Rock.

The town and the beach are the topic of a poem by Garrison Keillor. In We Are Still Married: Stories and Letters, Keillor has a four-page essay about his visits to Stinson Beach and how thinking of the beach helps him sleep.

The poet Robert Duncan wrote his influential collection Opening the Field at a house in Stinson Beach.

Janis Joplin's cremated ashes were scattered along this beach as well as the Pacific Ocean.

The story of a young surfer's recovery from a shark attack is the subject of a book, Far from Shore.

Author Danielle Steel writes about Stinson Beach in her novel One Day at a Time.

== See also ==
- List of beaches in California
- List of California state parks
