= Lagunitas, California =

Unincorporated community in California, United States

Lagunitas
- Unincorporated community
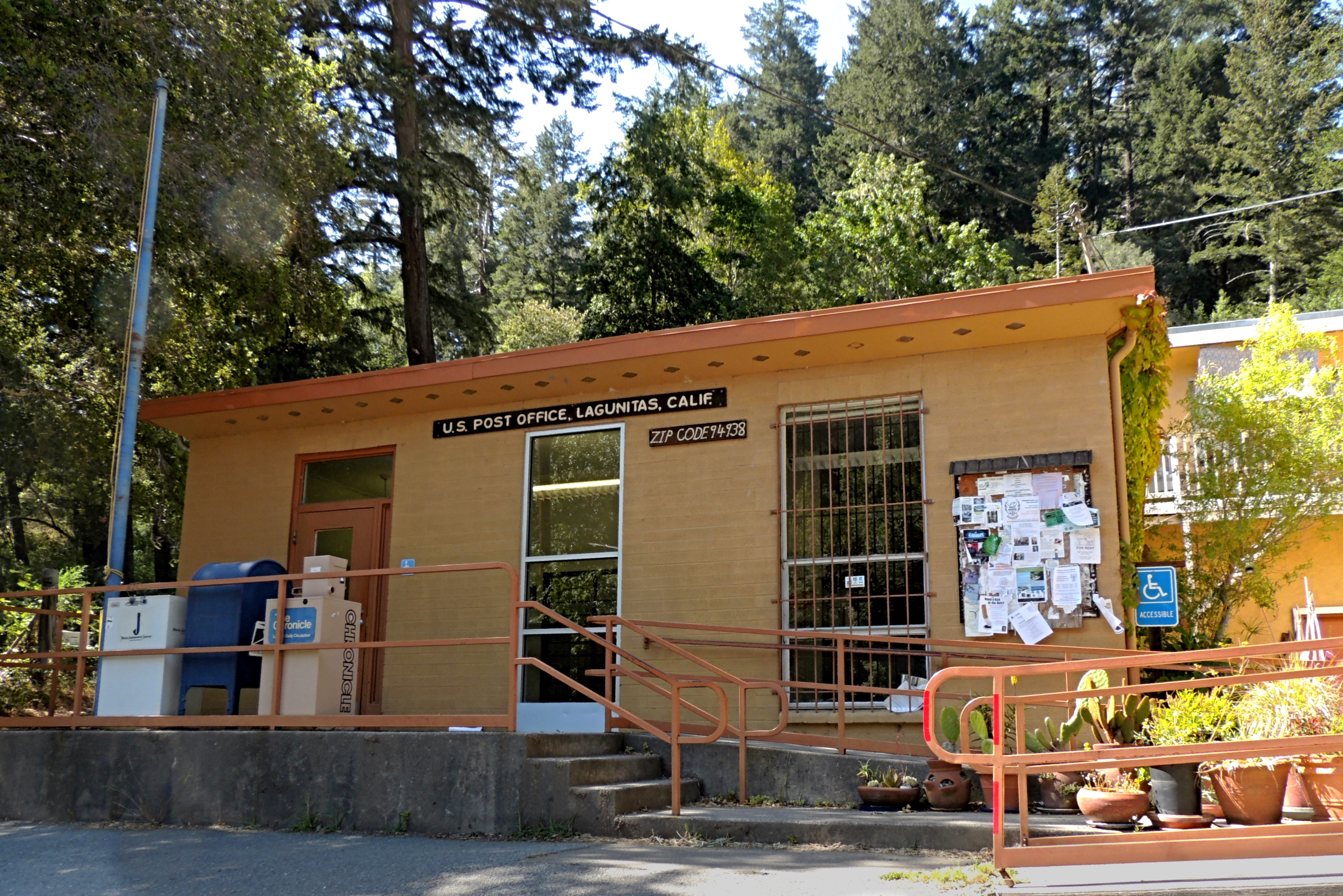
- U.S. Post Office in Lagunitas

- Location in California Lagunitas (the United States)
- Coordinates: 38°00′41″N 122°42′08″W
- Country: United States
- State: California
- County: Marin County
- Elevation: 217 ft (66 m)

Lagunitas (Spanish for "little lakes") is an unincorporated community in Marin County, California, United States. It is located 10 miles (16 km) southwest of Novato, at an elevation of 217 feet (66 m). Lagunitas is aggregated with Forest Knolls by the U.S. Census into the census-designated place (CDP) Lagunitas-Forest Knolls.

The first post office at Lagunitas opened in 1906. Lagunitas' ZIP Code is 94938.

The town takes its name from the nearby Lagunitas Creek, which formed a series of "little lakes" (lagunitas) on Mount Tamalpais, later dammed to form reservoirs, such as Lake Lagunitas.

== Geography ==
Lagunitas is located in a mountainous part of Marin County, just north of Kent Lake and east of Samuel P. Taylor State Park. Kent Lake serves as the primary tributary into the Lagunitas Creek, which flows into the Tomales Bay and from there the Pacific Ocean.

== Demographics ==
Statistics describing Lagnuitas' demographics are grouped by the U.S. Census with the nearby unincorporated community of Forest Knolls. The two towns share a population of 1,924 people split between 801 families and 866 households.

=== Political affiliation ===
Lagunitas staunchly supports the Democratic Party in elections. The town is represented in the U.S. Congress by two Democratic senators, Laphonza Butler and Alex Padilla, and by Democratic representative Jared Huffman in the House.

In the 2020 United States presidential election, Lagunitas voted for the Democratic Party's nominee Joe Biden over Republican incumbent Donald Trump by a margin of nearly 77 percentage points in Biden's favor. Lagunitas supported Biden more than they did Democratic nominee Hillary Clinton in the 2016 presidential election.

== Education ==
The community is served by the Lagunitas School District and the Tamalpais Union High School District. Lagunitas' two elementary schools, which are merged into the same property and share a single principal, include the only public Montessori school in Marin County, and a middle school serving grades 6-8.

== Transport ==
=== Roads ===
Lagunitas' main road is Sir Francis Drake Boulevard, which itself runs from its intersection with California State Route 1 just south of Point Reyes Station to the western terminus of Interstate 580 near San Rafael. The road serves as the only way in and out of Lagunitas by land.

=== Public transport ===
Lagunitas is served by Marin Transit, with a stop at Sir Francis Drake Blvd and Cintura Avenue on bus route 68 connecting Lagunitas between Inverness and the San Rafael Transit Center, the latter of which provides direct links to other Marin Transit routes as well as Golden Gate Transit and Sonoma–Marin Area Rail Transit (SMART), themselves linking Lagunitas to other Bay Area transit services as well as providing transit access to Bay Area airports.

== Notable people ==
=== Musicians ===
- J. P. Pickens; lived in Lagunitas from 1963 to 1969, and was the magnet who drew in many other 1960s musicians to the area. Other musicians who lived in Lagunitas during this era included:
  - The Grateful Dead, rock band; lived at a former Boy Scout camp in Lagunitas in 1966.
  - Janis Joplin, singer, and other members of Big Brother and the Holding Company.
  - The Sons of Champlin, with at least one member settling in the area long term.
- Barbara "Sandi" Robison, singer; Lagunitas was her childhood home.
- Naomi Judd, country musician; lived in Lagunitas from 1975 to 1979, with her daughters Wynonna Judd and Ashley Judd, while attending College of Marin.

=== Others ===
- Klaus Kinski, German actor; lived here in an isolated cabin here from 1981 until his death in 1991. His son Nikolai Kinski lived with his mother nearby in Forest Knolls.
- Tony Magee, brewer and founder of Lagunitas Brewing Company; the company started out as a homebrewing project in his garage in Lagunitas in 1993, expanded into a microbrewery in nearby Forest Knolls, and soon moved to a much larger brewery in Petaluma, but retained the town's name.
- Clinton Hart Merriam, zoologist, ethnographer, and naturalist; built a cabin near the town that served as a summer home.
- Nicholas Sand, psychedelic drug chemist.
- Richard Waters, sculptor and sonic artist.
