= The Inkwells =

Bodies of water in California, United States

- Shafters (upper); Hole (lower)
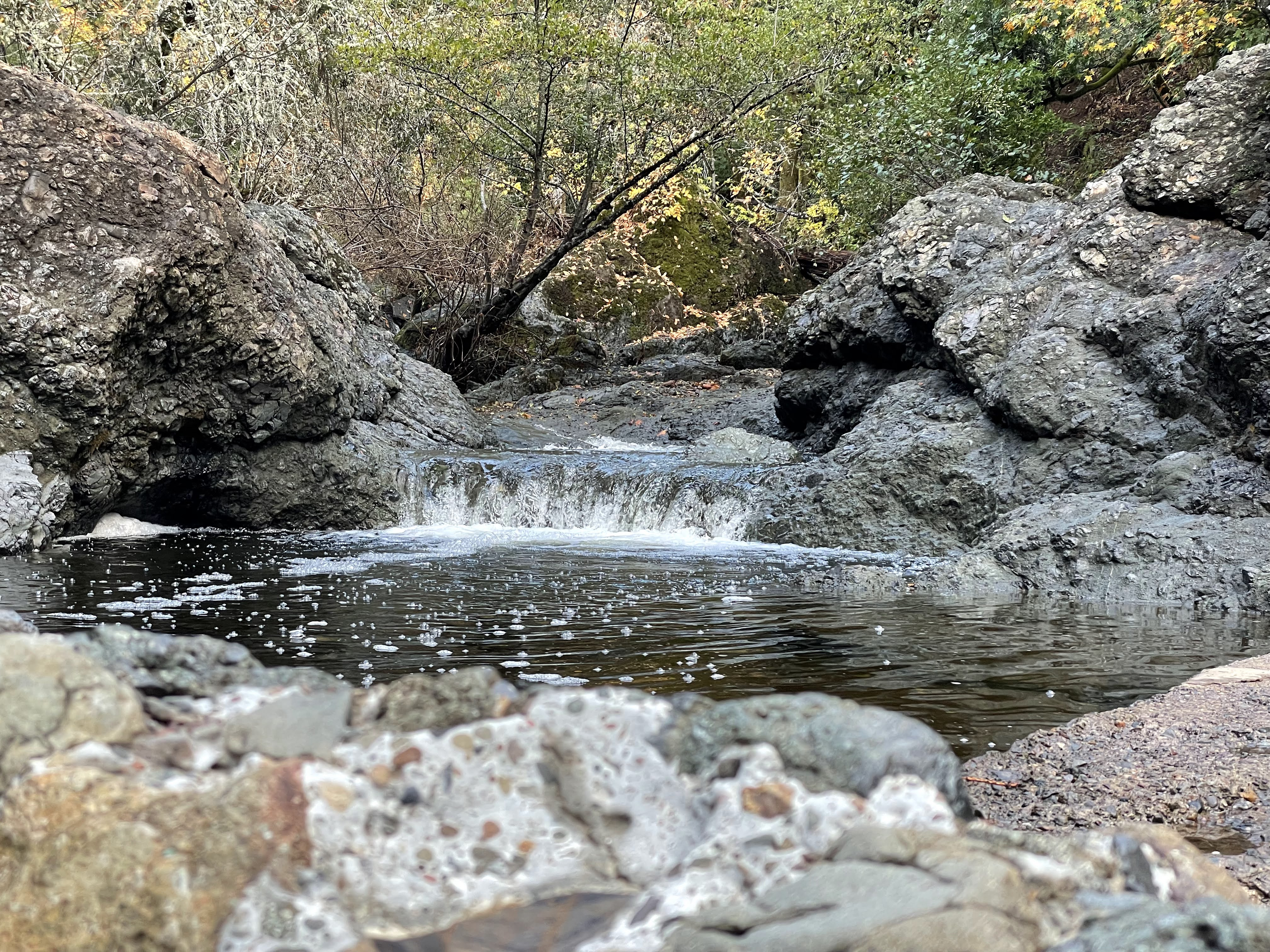
- The upper Inkwell

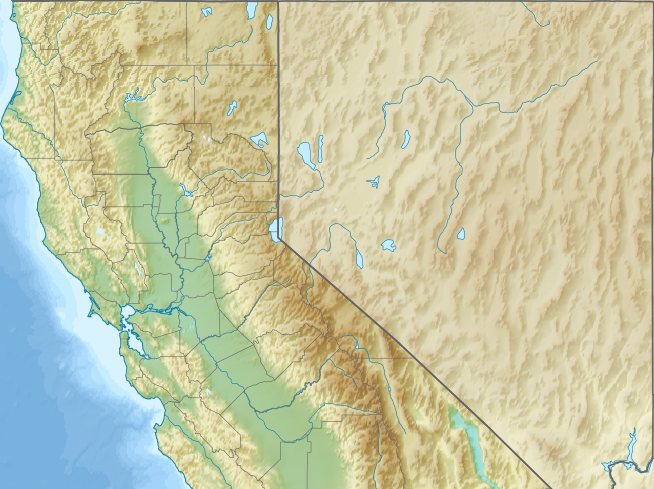
- Location within Northern California
- Location: Marin County, California
- Coordinates: 38.004831°N 122.708891°W
- Part of: Tomales Bay Watershed
- Primary inflows: Lagunitas Creek, San Geronimo Creek
- Primary outflows: Lagunitas Creek
- Surface elevation: 53 metres (174 ft)

The Inkwells (also known as The Ink Wells) are two deep natural swimming pools in Lagunitas Creek, in Marin County, California. The upper Inkwell is also known as "Shafters", named after the former railroad bridge that bore its name nearby, whereas the lower Inkwell is simply known as "Inkwell" or "Hole" because it is deeper and darker. Together, they are known as "The Inkwells". They are a common swimming spot in summer, despite failing to meet current water quality standards due to high levels of coliform. The Inkwells are accessible by car as well as public transit, with a Marin Transit bus stop being less than a mile away. The Inkwells Bridge, which runs above the inkwells, is part of the Bay Area Ridge Trail. It also carries pipes that bring water from nearby Kent Lake and the nearby Nicasio Reservoir to be treated. Coho salmon can be seen in the pools trying to jump and swim upstream from late fall into winter; the best time to see the salmon is a few days after a heavy rain.
