= Marin Municipal Water District =

Californian government agency

The Marin Municipal Water District (MMWD) is the government agency that provides drinking water to southern and central Marin County, California. Chartered in 1912, it became California's first municipal water district. It serves 191,000 customers in a 147-square-mile (380 km^{2}) area that includes ten towns and cities.

== History ==
In 1888, the Tamalpais Land & Water Company (TL&WC) was chartered as a 100-year corporation. In 1890, Mill Valley, California installed water supply facilities. In 1893, Tamalpais Land & Water Co. (TL&WC) constructed a dam and reservoir in Cascade Canyon. In 1902, Tamalpais Land & Water Co. split off its water operations to form the North Coast Water Company (NCWC). In 1904, North Coast Water Company agreed to supply water to the Belvedere Land Company. In 1912, the North Coast Water Company (successor to the Tamalpais Land and Water Company) and other Marin water companies were incorporated into the Marin Municipal Water District (MMWD).

Marin Municipal Water District took over the properties:

- North Coast Water Company
- Marin Water and Power Company
- Lagunitas Water Company

== Overview ==
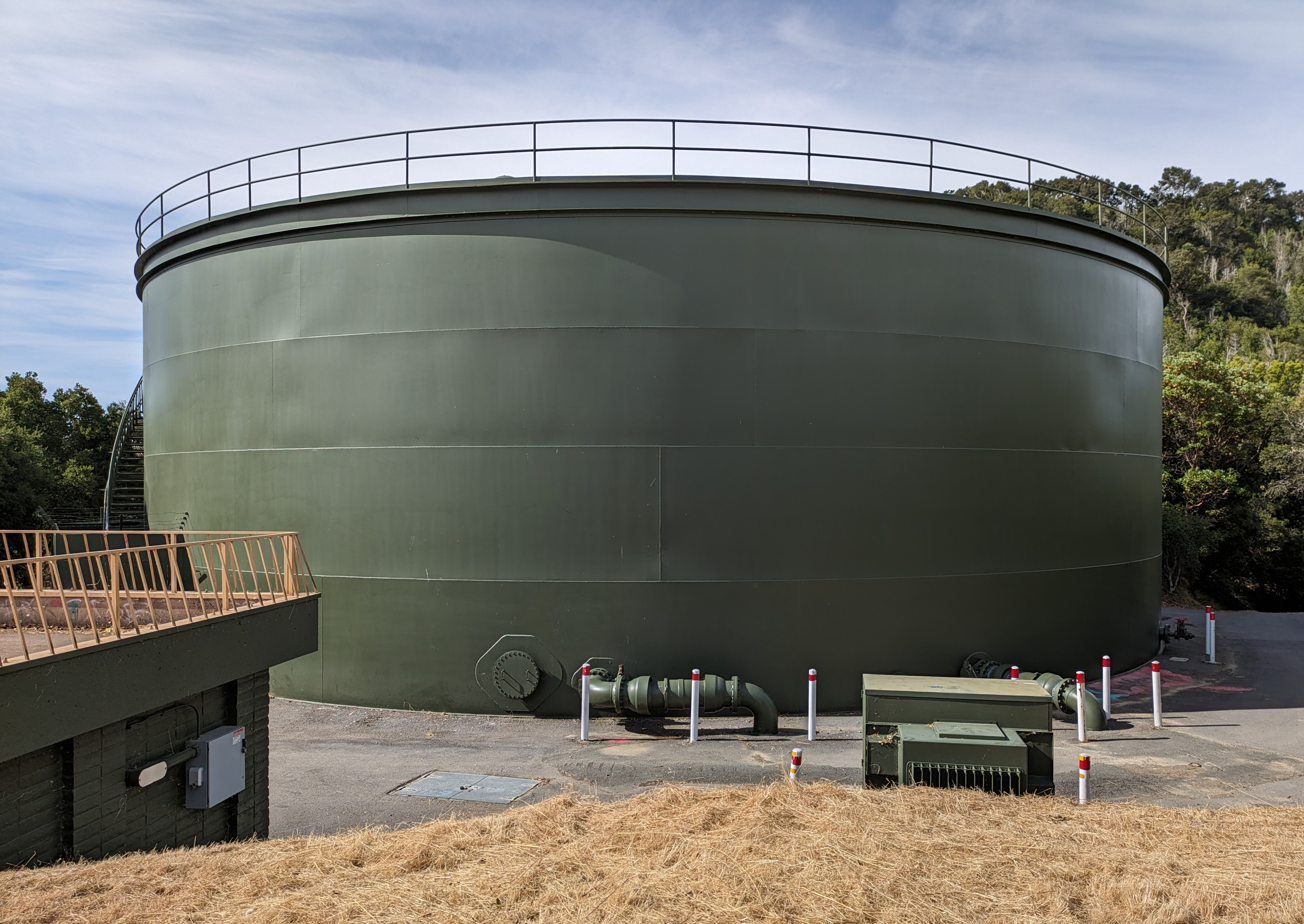
A water tower operated by MMWD

The Marin Municipal Water District provides clean water to about 190,000 residents and businesses in the central and southern parts of Marin County. The water district controls and protects over 21,000 acres of valuable watershed land. This watershed leads to seven different reservoirs that can be found on Mount Tamalpais and West Marin.

Marin's water district delivers an average of 22 million gallons of water per day through its 900+ miles of pipelines and 99 pumping stations. All of this water is processed through two water treatment plants and one finishing plant. About 75% of the districts water supply come from rainfall on Mt. Tamalpais watershed and in the grassy hills of west Marin. The rainwater flow into the 7 reservoirs of Marin.

As of 2022, the average water storage is up 106.90% than compared to 2021. The current storage is 59,046 AF (acre-feet) compared to the storage of 2021, which was 27,557AF for this date.

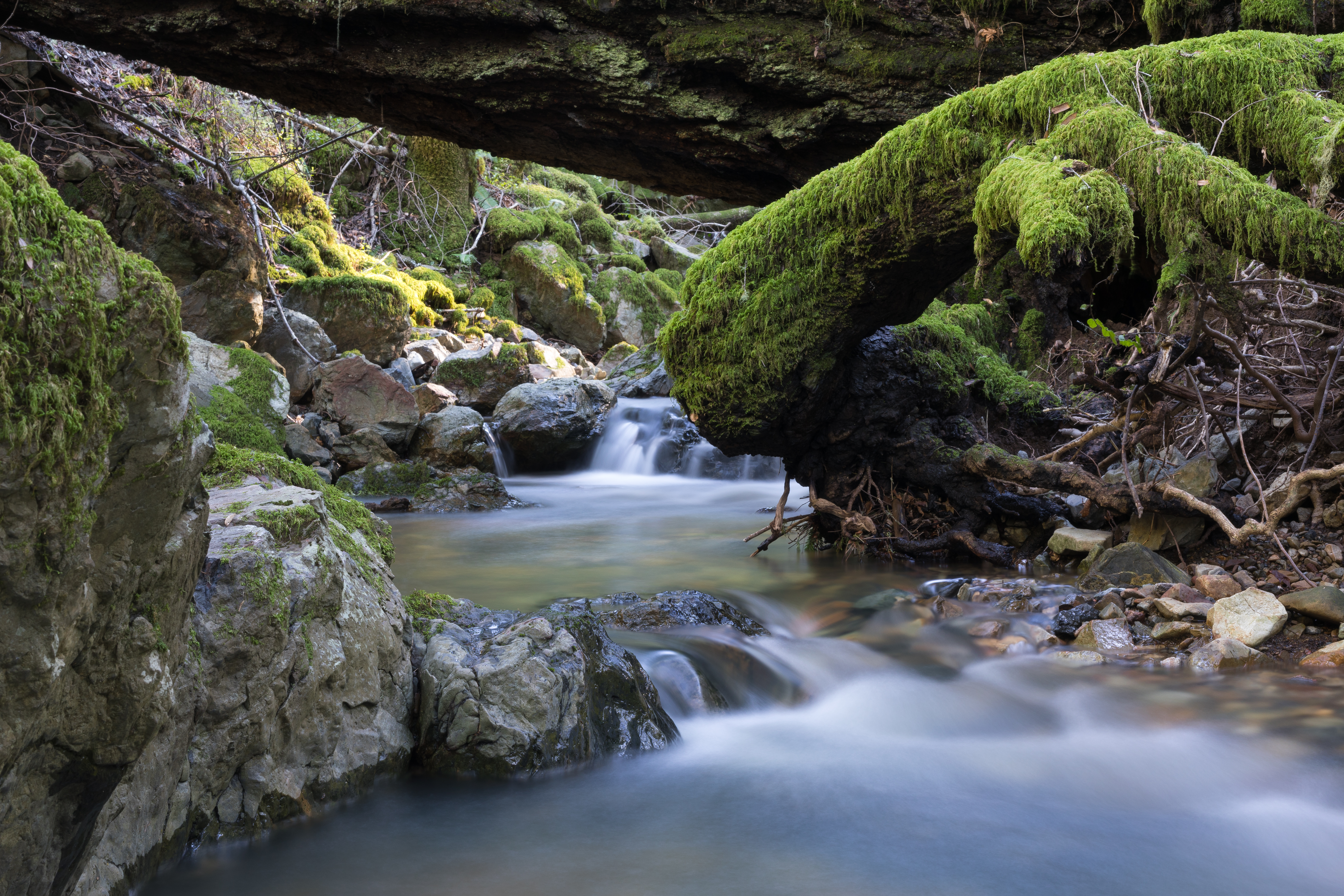

== Reservoirs ==
The district's seven reservoirs in Marin County provide about 75% of the water it uses:

- Alpine Lake, formed by Alpine Dam on Lagunitas Creek
- Bon Tempe Lake on Lagunitas Creek
- Kent Lake, formed by Peters Dam on Lagunitas Creek
- Lake Lagunitas on Lagunitas Creek
- Nicasio Reservoir, formed by Seeger Dam on Nicasio Creek
- Phoenix Reservoir
- Soulajule Reservoir on Arroyo Sausal

Combined, these seven reservoirs have a capacity of 79,566 acre-feet (98.14 million m^{3}). Alpine, Bon Tempe, Kent, Lagunitas, and Phoenix are all part of the Mount Tamalpais watershed.

The district's remaining 25% of water is sourced from Sonoma County's Russian River water system.

== Recreation ==
Over 21,000 acres (8,500 ha) of land in District ownership are open to the public for recreational use from sunrise to sunset. There are 130 miles (210 km) of trails and unpaved roads available for hiking. The Cataract Falls Trail is one of the most popular trails. Many of the trails are also open for dog walking and horseback riding, while bicycling is only allowed on fire roads. Portions of the seven District reservoirs are open for hiking, biking, horseback riding, fishing, and picnicking. Camping, swimming, and boating are prohibited.

== Fisheries ==
MMWD is commonly recognized as a leader in the area for salmon conservation. There are various programs dedicated to monitor salmon populations and enhance their natural habitats such as Lagunitas Creek Stewardship Plan and the Watershed Stewards Program. Lagunitas Creek is home to one of the last and largest remaining populations of Central California Coast coho salmon as it is a spawning and rearing ground for the endangered species of coho salmon and steelhead trout.

== Wildlife ==
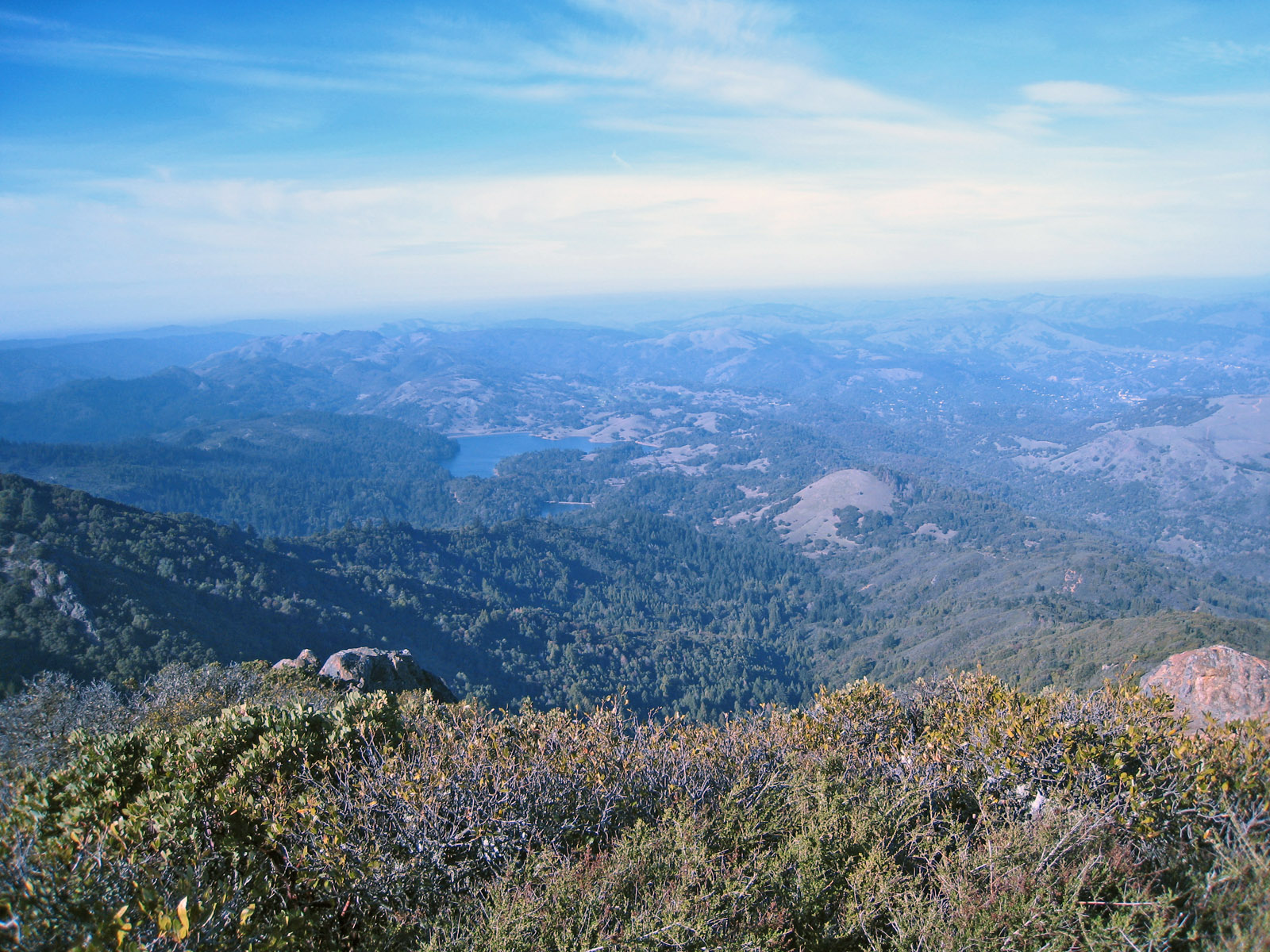

There are over 400 species living in the Mt. Tamalpais watershed. These species include rare, threatened, and even endangered animals. MMWD supports a variety of programs that are in place to help monitor the ecosystem health, species presence, and population trends over time. Some of these programs in place to help sustain and monitor species such as the northern spotted owl, the yellow-legged frog, and the western pond turtle.

== Employment ==
The water district sustains various employees at both full time, part time, and seasonal levels. It currently has about 240 full-time employees who are governed by a five-member board of directors. Full time employees qualify for a benefits package after six months of employment.

== See also ==
- Santa Clara Valley Water District
- Sonoma County Water Agency
- Water in California
