= Bear Valley Creek =

Stream in California

- First recent evidence of coho salmon in Bear Valley Creek discovered in May 2025.

- Location of the mouth of Bear Valley Creek Creek in California

Location
- Country: United States
- State: California
- Region: Marin County, California

Physical characteristics
- Source: Southwest slope of Mount Wittenberg on Inverness Ridge
  - location: 2.1 miles (3.4 km) west by southwest of Olema, California
  - coordinates: 38°01′57.5″N 122°49′35.1″W
  - elevation: 976 ft (297 m)
- Mouth: Confluence with Lagunitas Creek
  - location: 0.5 miles (0.80 km) southeast of Point Reyes Station, California
  - coordinates: 38°03′46.5″N 122°49′0.5″W
  - elevation: 4 ft (1.2 m)

Bear Valley Creek is a 5.2-mile-long (8.4 km) north-flowing perennial stream in Point Reyes National Seashore, Marin County, Northern California. It is the final named tributary to Lagunitas Creek, which in turn, then flows to Tomales Bay and the Pacific Ocean. The Lagunitas Creek watershed hosts the largest southern population of federally threatened Central California Coast coho salmon evolutionary significant unit (ESU).

== History ==
Bear Valley Creek and Bear Valley are named for the bears that preyed on cattle in the area historically. Rafael Garcia, the grantee of Rancho Tomales y Baulines in 1836 had a corral at this location. It was also the site of a private Country Club from 1890 through the late 1930s.

== Watershed and Course ==
Map of Bear Valley Creek where it is abruptly diverted northwest by a San Andreas Fault Zone shutter ridge.

Bear Valley Creek drains a 4.1 square miles (11 km^{2}) watershed on the on the eastern/inland side of Inverness Ridge. The creek begins on the southwest slope of Mount Wittenberg 976 feet (297 m) elevation and descends east to the Olema Valley. A subtributary begins at Divide Meadow From Divide Meadow the subtributary of Bear Valley Creek descends on the east side of the ridge, and Coast Creek descends on its west side to the Pacific Ocean. Bear Valley Creek has several other unnamed subtributaries on the inland side of Inverness Ridge with sources as high as 1,200 feet (370 m) on the slopes of Mount Wittenberg. Although Bear Valley Creek enters the San Andreas Fault Zone just west of Olema and was once tributary to Olema Creek, the fault surface rupture in 1906 created a shutter ridge which forced Bear Valley Creek to make an abrupt left-turn northwards. Thus, it now flows west of and parallel to Olema Creek until it crosses the Olema Marsh, which is jointly owned by the Seashore and Audubon Canyon Ranch. Next, Bear Valley Creek passes under Sir Francis Drake Boulevard (aka Levee Road) and passes 80 feet (24 m) through California's Wildlife Conservation Board lands before entering Lagunitas Creek as its last named tributary.

== Ecology ==
In May, 2025 Point Reyes National Seashore Association (PRNSA) Fisheries Field Crew Lead Brentley McNeill spotted six coho salmon (Oncorhynchus kisutch) juveniles swimming in Bear Valley Creek—the first documented occurrence in recent decades of coho juveniles in this location (see photo). These coho salmon are part of the federally threatened Central California Coast coho salmon evolutionary significant unit (ESU) and part of the Lagunitas Creek watershed, a stronghold for 10%-20% of the coho in the ESU. Ten fish passage barriers were identified in a 2005 study which could be modified to enhance Bear Valley Creek for coho salmon. Because of its location adjacent to Park Headquarters, Bear Valley Creek is the most visible stream in the Seashore and a prime location to provide education on stream ecology.

== Recreation ==
The Bear Valley Trail is a 3.2 miles (5.1 km) roundtrip hike that ascends from the Bear Valley Visitor's Center to Divide Meadow at 600 feet (180 m) elevation.

== See also ==
- List of watercourses in the San Francisco Bay Area
