= Lagunitas Creek =

Stream in California, United States

Lagunitas Creek Arroyo de San Geronimo, Paper Mill Creek
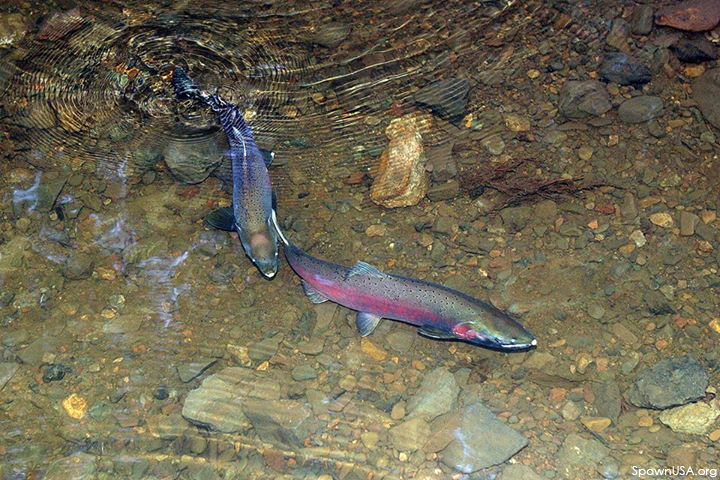
- Pair of endangered coho salmon in Lagunitas Creek

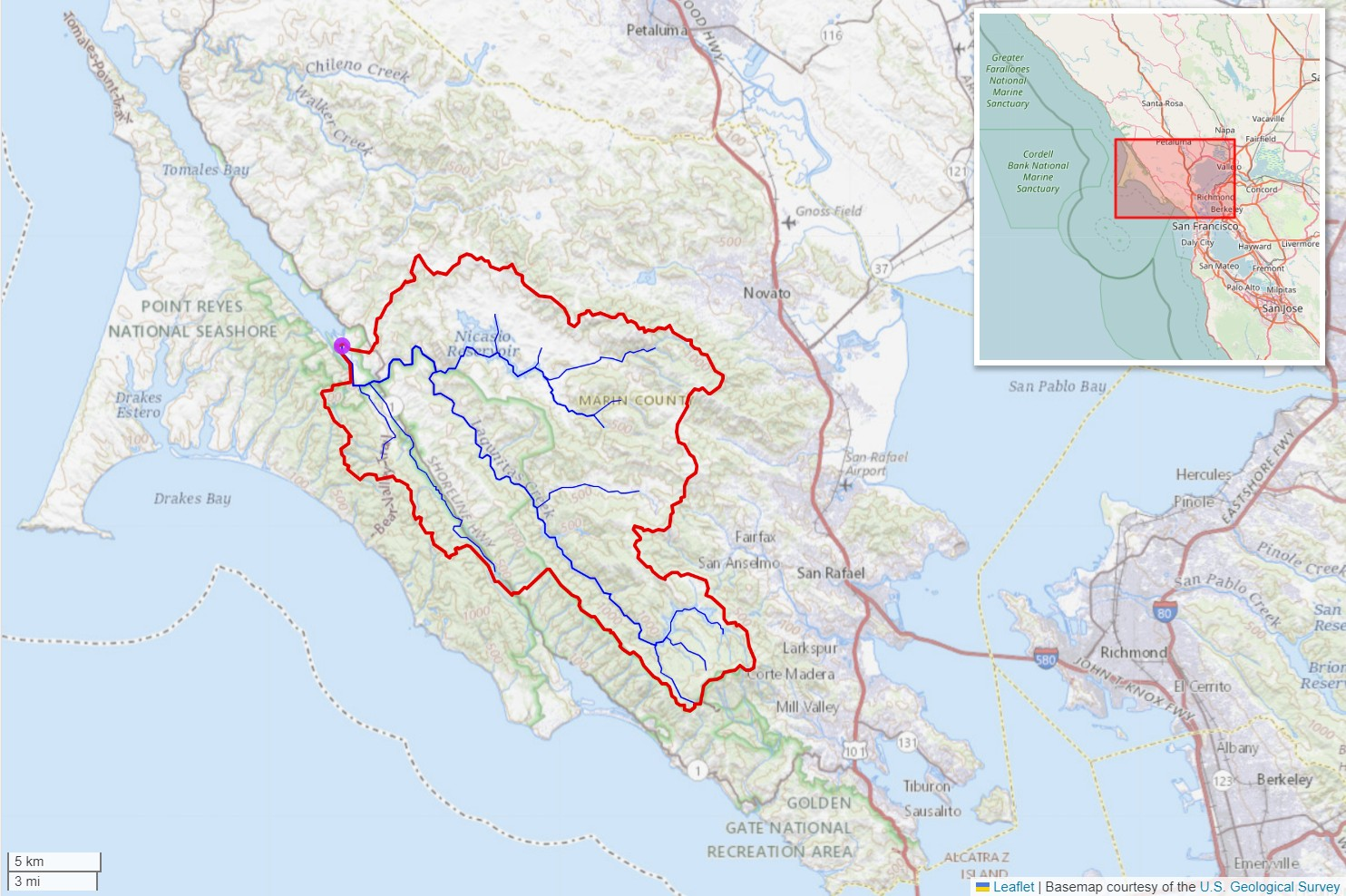
- Lagunitas Creek watershed (Interactive map)
- Etymology: Spanish
- Native name: Tokelalume (Coast Miwok)

Location
- Country: United States
- State: California
- Region: Marin County

Physical characteristics
- Source: Mount Tamalpais
  - coordinates: 37°56′51″N 122°35′50″W
- Mouth: Tomales Bay
  - coordinates: 38°4′48″N 122°49′37″W
  - elevation: 0 ft (0 m)
- Length: 20 mi (32 km)
- Basin size: 103 sq mi (270 km^{2})

Basin features
- Tributaries
  - left: Olema Creek, Bear Valley Creek
  - right: Devils Gulch, San Geronimo Creek, Nicasio Creek

Lagunitas Creek is a 24-mile-long (39 km) northward-flowing stream in Marin County, California. The watershed hosts the largest spawning runs of endangered coho salmon (Oncorhynchus kisutch) in the southern portion of Central California Coast coho salmon Evolutionary Significant Unit.

The stream's headwaters begin on the northern slopes of Mount Tamalpais in the Coast Range and terminate in southeast Tomales Bay, 1.5 miles (2.4 km) northwest of Point Reyes Station, California. Lagunitas Creek feeds several reservoirs on Mt. Tamalpais that supply a major portion of the county's drinking water.

== History ==
To the Coast Miwok the stream was known as Tokelalume, then by the Spanish as Arroyo de San Geronimo, then Daniels creek. Now the "San Geronimo" survives only as the San Geronimo Creek tributary. The modern name, Lagunitas Creek, is derived from the several "lagunitas" (Spanish for "little lakes") which have now been turned into reservoirs by dams in the upper watershed. It was once known by the alternate name Paper Mill Creek, named for Samuel P. Taylor's paper mill on the creek in Taylorville. This mill, the Pioneer Paper Mill, was built in 1856, the first in California. Both "Lagunitas" and "Paper Mill" were used for names of the creek from the nineteenth and well into the twentieth century, with some older literature specifying that Paper Mill Creek was formed by the confluence of Lagunitas and White's Creek (an alternate name for San Geronimo Creek).

== Watershed and course ==
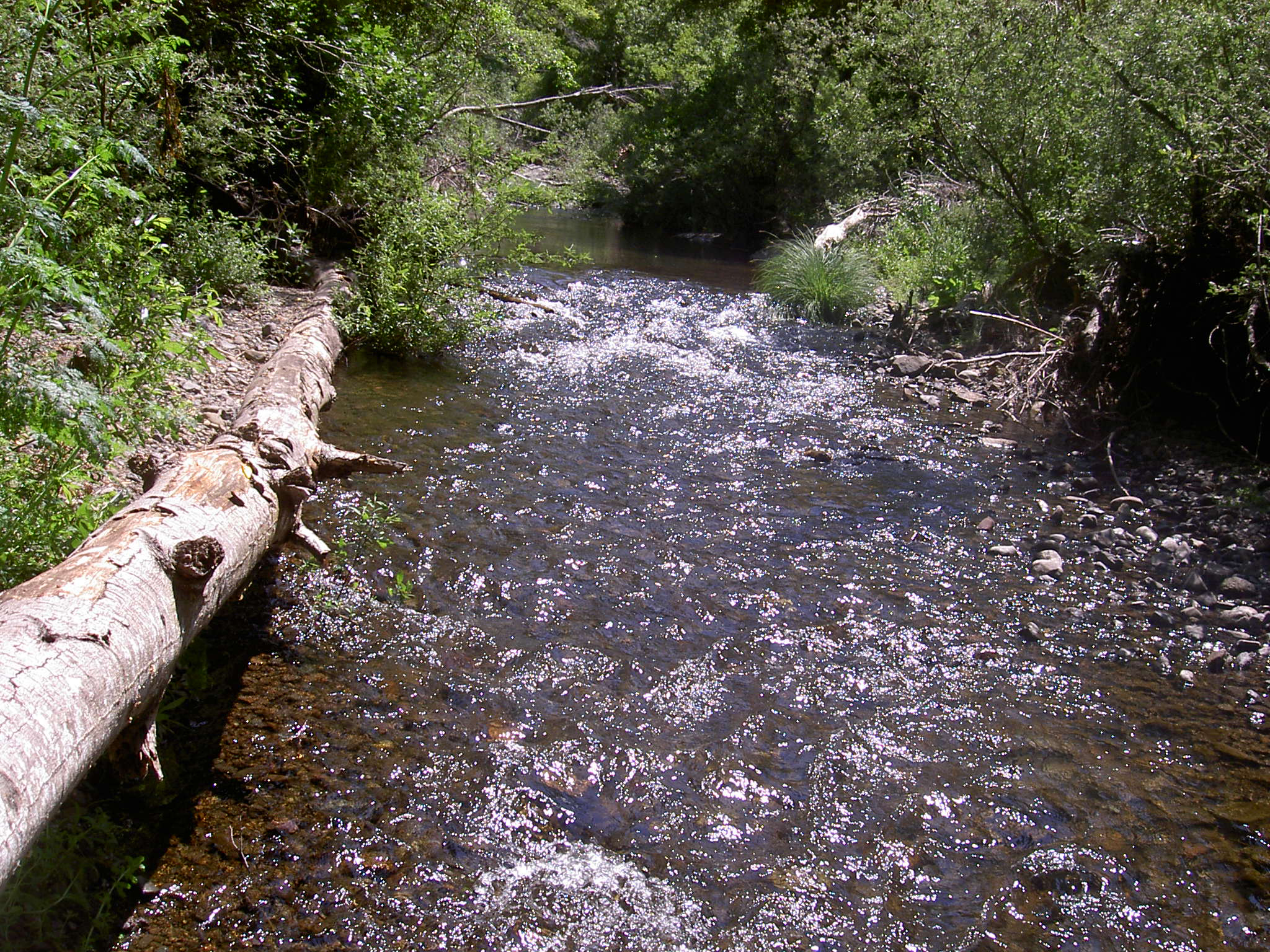
Lagunitas Creek in Samuel P. Taylor State Park

Lagunitas Creek's major tributaries include San Geronimo Creek, Devils Gulch, Nicasio Creek, and Olema Creek. The creek's source is the northern slope of Mount Tamalpais, a few miles (~6–8 km) east of Bolinas Lagoon. The creek begins as three forks, the East Fork, Middle Fork and West Fork. After about a mile (1,600 m), they all flow into Lake Lagunitas, which drains into Bon Tempe Lake, which drains into Alpine Lake. Downstream of Alpine Lake, the creek flows roughly northwest until it reaches Kent Lake. Just downstream of Kent Lake, San Geronimo Creek joins the creek, right before it forms the Inkwells. Lagunitas continues northwest through Samuel P. Taylor State Park where it receives Barnabe Creek and is joined by Nicasio Creek, which flows from Nicasio Reservoir, another water storage reservoir. Shortly after this confluence, Lagunitas turns westward and flows through the town of Point Reyes Station. On the west side of the town, the creek is joined by Olema Creek, the largest tributary in the Lagunitas Creek watershed. Mainstem Olema Creek flows for 9 miles (14 km) along the San Andreas Fault Zone, with a catchment area of 14.5 square miles (38 km^{2}). Although Bear Valley Creek used to flow into Olema Creek, fault movement created a shutter ridge, forcing Bear Valley to turn abruptly north and run parallel to Olema Creek. Bear Valley Creek is the last named tributary of Lagunitas Creek and after its confluence, Lagunitas Creek turns northward and then empties into the wetlands at the southeast end of Tomales Bay.

The Lagunitas Creek watershed drains 103 square miles (270 km^{2}). Most of its major tributaries are dammed, including the Kent, Alpine, Bon Tempe, Lagunitas, and Nicasio reservoirs. The San Geronimo Valley is the last un-dammed headwater tributary of Lagunitas Creek. Each of the reservoirs in the watershed has a dam and the biggest problem in the watershed is their blocking of the streams, which prevents fish migration. The dams dewater the streambed, especially as the first winter rains fill the reservoirs instead of flowing downstream. Also, water from the late winter rains are partially lost from streamflows because of evaporation from the reservoir surfaces.

Erosion is also a significant problem in the watershed. Sedimentation from Lagunitas Creek into Tomales Bay resulted from nineteenth century logging and cattle grazing of riparian plants which otherwise slow erosion. However, sediment loads have been decreasing since the mid-twentieth century and the tidal marsh at the mouth of the creek is no longer aggrading likely due to sediment capture in the many upstream reservoirs.

Sir Francis Drake Boulevard follows the course of San Geronimo Creek west and then north along mainstem Lagunitas Creek through Samuel P. Taylor State Park.

== Ecology ==
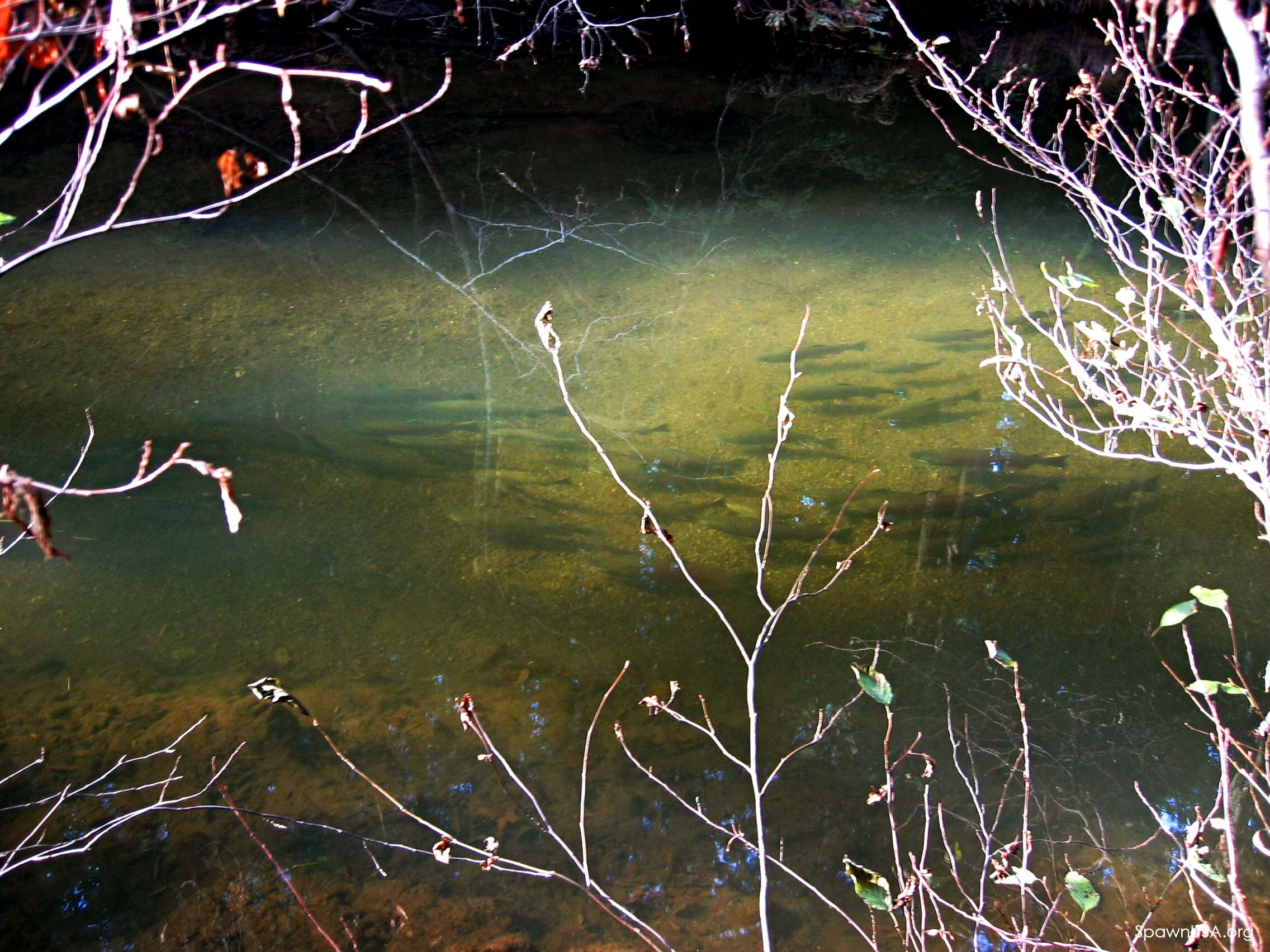
School of native coho salmon in Lagunitas Creek

The Lagunitas Creek Watershed is home to the largest remaining wild run of coho salmon (Oncorhynchus kisutch) in Central California. These coho are part of the "Central California Coast Evolutionarily Significant Unit," and are listed as "endangered" at both the state and federal level. This unit has declined from an estimated 50,000–125,000 adult returns to only 500 spawning adults, and is at high risk for extinction, with only 67 adults returning in 2013. Significant efforts to protect and restore these fish have been underway in the Watershed since the 1980s. Before Seeger Dam was constructed in 1960 by the Marin Municipal Water District, Nicasio Creek supported half of the steelhead trout (Oncorhynchus mykiss) and coho salmon spawning populations in the Lagunitas Creek watershed. The 50% of remaining historical salmon habitat in the Lagunitas Creek watershed is now also behind dams. Because dams also block sediment transport, there is a lack of suitable spawning gravel in many lower stream reaches for spawning. Most spawning in the Lagunitas Creek watershed now takes place in San Geronimo Creek, an unregulated tributary, and the region immediately downstream of its confluence with Lagunitas Creek.

Strong efforts are also being made to protect and restore undammed, headwater reaches of this Watershed in the San Geronimo Valley, where upwards of 40% of the Lagunitas Creek salmon spawn each year and where as much as 1/3 of the juvenile salmon (or fry) spend their entire freshwater lives. Roy's Dam on San Geronimo Creek was built in the 1920s to supply water to a ranch. It was an obstacle for coho salmon and steelhead trout trying access to the habitat upstream of the dam for spawning. It was decided to lower the dam instead of completely removing it because of the large amount of sediment that had accumulated behind the dam. This re-opened critical spawning habitat no longer available on other Lagunitas Creek tributaries. The Salmon Protection and Watershed Network leads winter tours for the public to learn about and view these spawning salmon, and also leads year-round opportunities for the public to get involved in stream restoration, monitoring spawning and smolt outmigration, juvenile fish rescue and relocation in the summer, and advocacy and policy development.

In the fall of 2017, two additional salmon species appeared in Lagunitas Creek, pink salmon (Oncorhynchus gorbuscha) and chum salmon (Oncorhynchus keta). Pink salmon, also known as humpback salmon, rarely spawn in coastal streams south of tributaries to Puget Sound in Washington state, although they were reported as far south as the San Lorenzo River in November 1915. The southern limit of spawning chum salmon, also known as dog salmon, is Tillamook Bay, Oregon although they were also reported in the San Lorenzo River in 1915. As of December 2017 a half dozen chum salmon and a dozen pink salmon were counted in Lagunitas Creek.

Below Kent Lake and the San Geronimo Creek confluence, the mainstem Lagunitas Creek courses through Samuel P. Taylor State Park, which hosts 600 acres of redwoods (Sequoia sempervirens) virgin forest.

Remnant populations of the foothill yellow-legged frog ((Rana boylii)), a Federal Species of Concern and California Species of Special Concern, persist in Little Carson Creek and Big Carson Creek, tributaries of Kent Lake.

== In literature ==
Under the name Paper Mill Creek, Lagunitas Creek is referred to, and crossed several times by car, in the course of Confessions of a Crap Artist, a 1975 novel by Philip K. Dick, partly set in Marin County.

Lagunitas Creek is cited in Jane Hirshfield's poem "Mountainal," from Ledger (New York: Knopf, 2020), p. 111.

Lagunitas Creek is the location of the poem "Meditation at Lagunitas" by Robert Hass, from his 1979 collection Praise.

== See also ==
- List of watercourses in the San Francisco Bay Area
- Samuel P. Taylor State Park
