= Lake Lagunitas =

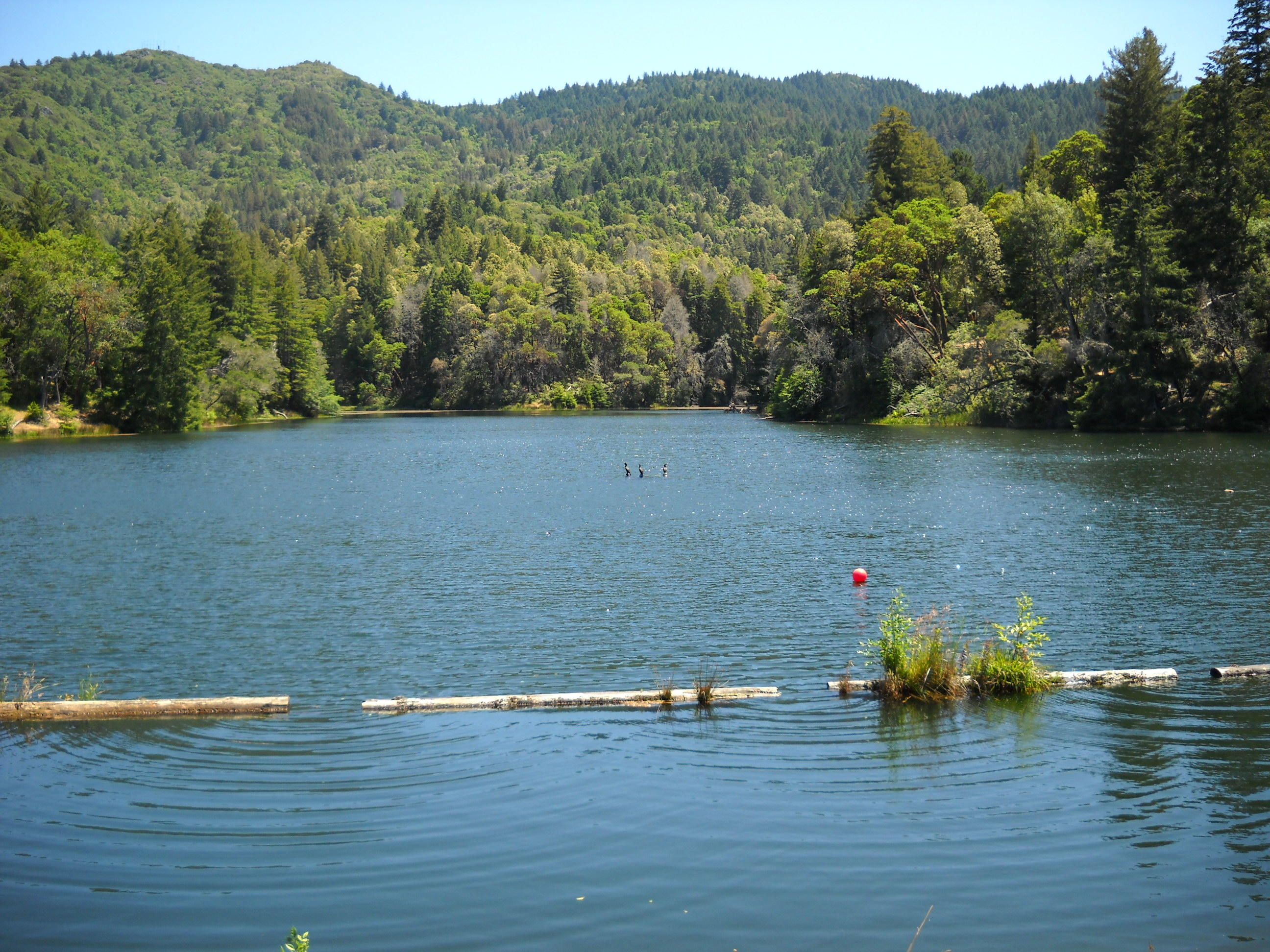
- The lake in 2009

- Location within California Location within the United States
- Location: Marin County, California
- Coordinates: 37°56′51″N 122°35′46″W
- Type: Reservoir
- Primary inflows: Lagunitas Creek
- Primary outflows: Lagunitas Creek
- Catchment area: 1.8 square miles (4.7 km^{2})
- Basin countries: United States
- Surface area: 22 acres (8.9 ha)
- Water volume: 341 acre-feet (421,000 m^{3})
- Surface elevation: 791.3 feet (241.2 m)

Lake Lagunitas is a reservoir on Lagunitas Creek in Marin County, California.

== Nearby lakes ==
Lake Lagunitas is one of seven reservoirs providing potable water to the Marin Municipal Water District. It is the oldest and smallest lake in the Mount Tamalpais watershed, with surface area of 22 acres (8.9 ha). About a mile east of Lake Lagunitas is Phoenix Lake, with surface area of approximately 25 acres. And 0.3 miles to the west of Lake Lagunitas is Bon Tempe Lake, which has an area of 280 acres. Further to the west of Bon Tempe Lake is Alpine Lake with an area of 224 acres.

The only major lake to the west of Fairfax-Bolinas Road is Kent Lake, the largest in the watershed with surface area of 432 acres.

== Lagunitas Dam ==
The reservoir is impounded by Lagunitas Dam, an earth dam 48 feet (15 m) tall, 433 feet (132 m) long, and 12 feet (3.7 m) wide. The dam was completed in 1872 (154 years ago).

== See also ==
- List of dams and reservoirs in California
- List of lakes in California
- List of lakes in the San Francisco Bay Area
