= Barnabe Creek =

Stream in California, U.S.

Coordinates: 38°01′11″N 122°43′33″W

Barnabe Creek is a stream in the U.S. state of California. Barnabe Creek is a tributary of Lagunitas Creek. It is located in Samuel P. Taylor State Park, Marin County.
