= Bear Valley =

Bear Valley may refer to:

United States

- Bear Valley, Arizona, a valley in Santa Cruz County, Arizona
  - Bear Valley raid, an armed conflict in 1886 during Geronimo's War
  - Battle of Bear Valley, battle in 1918
- Bear Valley, Alpine County, California
  - Bear Valley (resort), a ski resort near Bear Valley in Alpine County, California
- Bear Valley Creek, a stream in Marin County, California
- Bear Valley Springs, Kern County, California
- Bear Valley, Colusa County, California
- Bear Valley, Mariposa County, California
- An alternate term for Big Bear Valley, in San Bernardino County, California
- Bear Valley, Minnesota, an unincorporated community in southeast Minnesota
- Bear Valley (Oregon), between John Day and Burns in eastern Oregon
- Bear Valley, Wisconsin, an unincorporated community and surrounding valley in southwestern Wisconsin
- Bear Valley (Anchorage), the name given to the far southeastern corner of Anchorage, Alaska
