= Sir and Star =

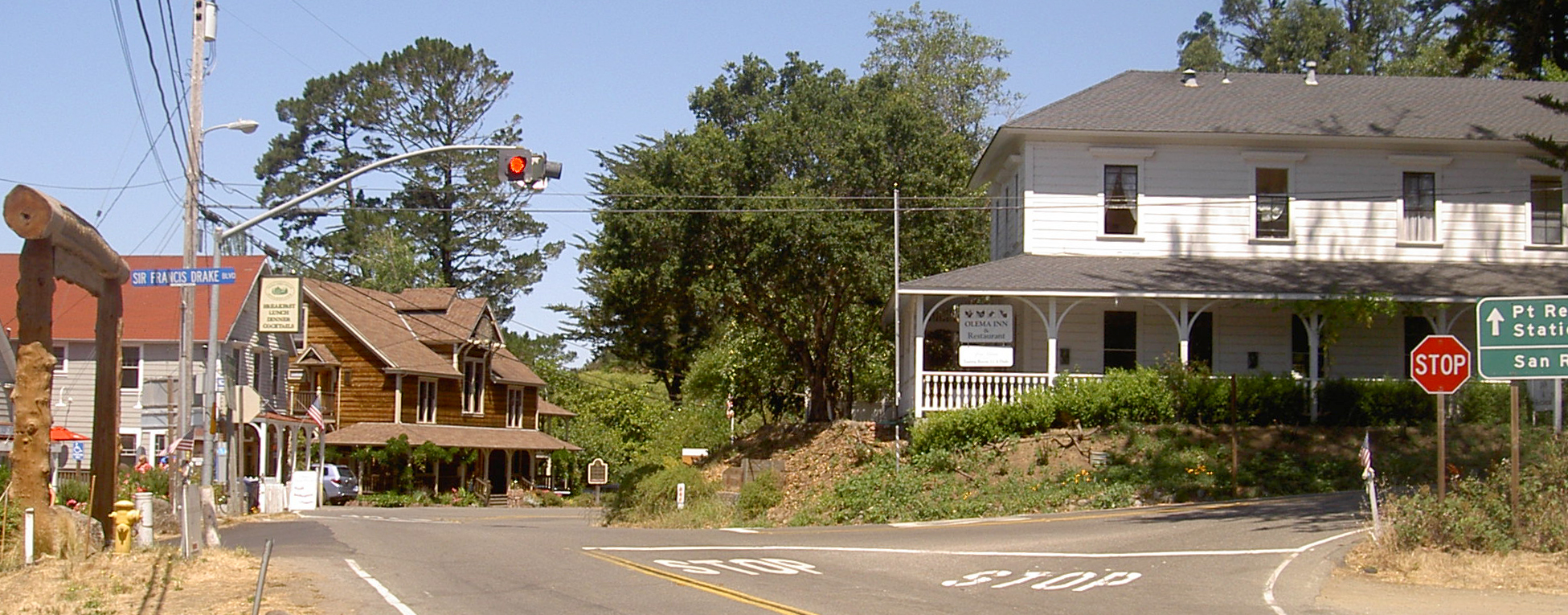
- The Olema (right) before being repainted from bright white to near black by its current owners

- Location within California Location within the United States

Restaurant information
- Closed: 2024
- Previous owners: Dana and Jennifer Sulprizio
- Head chef: Daniel DeLong
- Food type: Farm to table
- Dress code: Casual
- Rating: 4 stars
- Coordinates: 38.040744°N 122.787743°W
- Seating capacity: 85
- Reservations: Yes
- Other locations: Manka's Inverness Lodge, Inverness, California
- Website: Official website

The Olema

General information
- Location: 10,000 Sir Francis Drake Boulevard, Olema, California 94950, United States; West Marin county
- Opening: July 4, 1876
- Owner: Daniel DeLong

Technical details
- Floor count: 2

Other information
- Number of rooms: 8
- Number of restaurants: 1
- Parking: On site

Sir and Star was a restaurant founded in 2012. It was located in The Olema, a historic restaurant and inn built in 1876. The restaurant was at the corner of Sir Francis Drake Boulevard and Star Route One in Olema, California. Olema is located in West Marin County 1 mile (1.6 kilometres) from the Bear Valley portal to the Point Reyes National Seashore.

== Early days ==
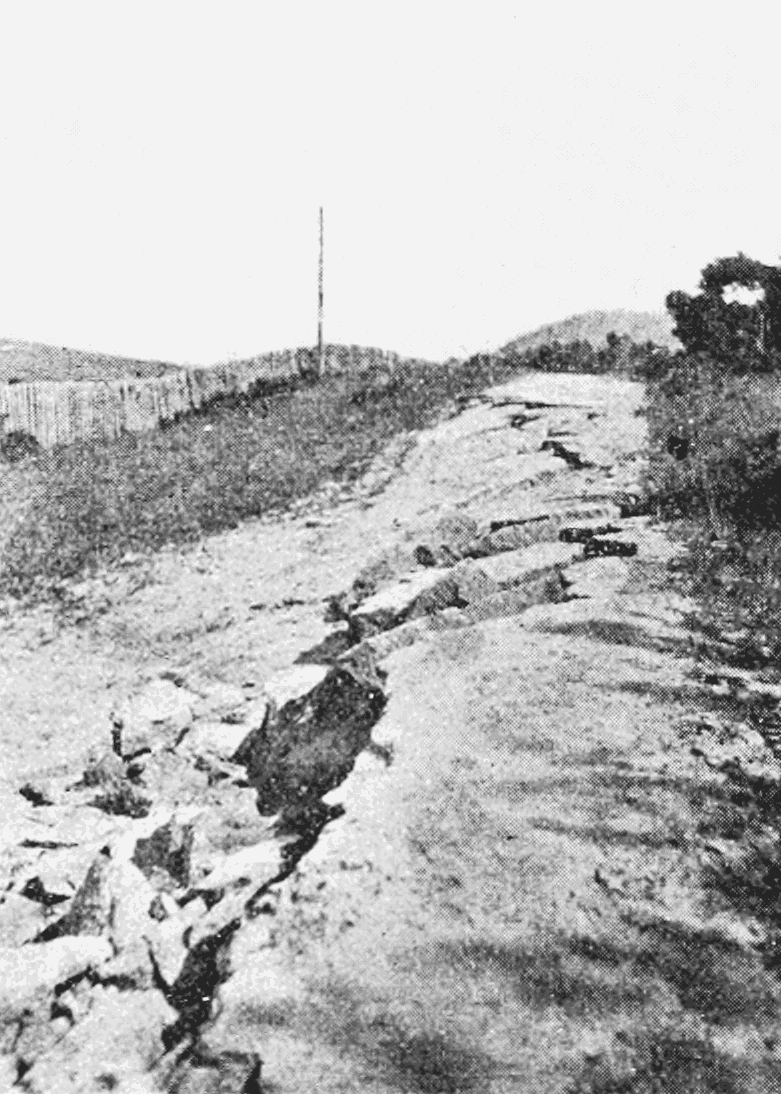
The road outside the inn had large earthquake-caused fissures in 1906.

The building was constructed by the area's original Spanish land grantee, Rafael Garcia, in 1876 as part of a 9,000-acre (3,600 ha) land grant from Mexico. John Nelson, the stage coach company owner that ran a stage from Olema to San Rafael, won the inn from Felix Garcia, Rafael's son, in a game of chance. The Nelsons owned the inn for three generations thereafter. The inn was a popular place of respite for local workers.

The name Olema has significant historical heritage originating from the over 125 adjacent Miwok Indian villages. In the Miwok language, Olemaloke roughly translates to "little coyote".

During the 1906 San Francisco earthquake the road near the inn was heavily damaged.

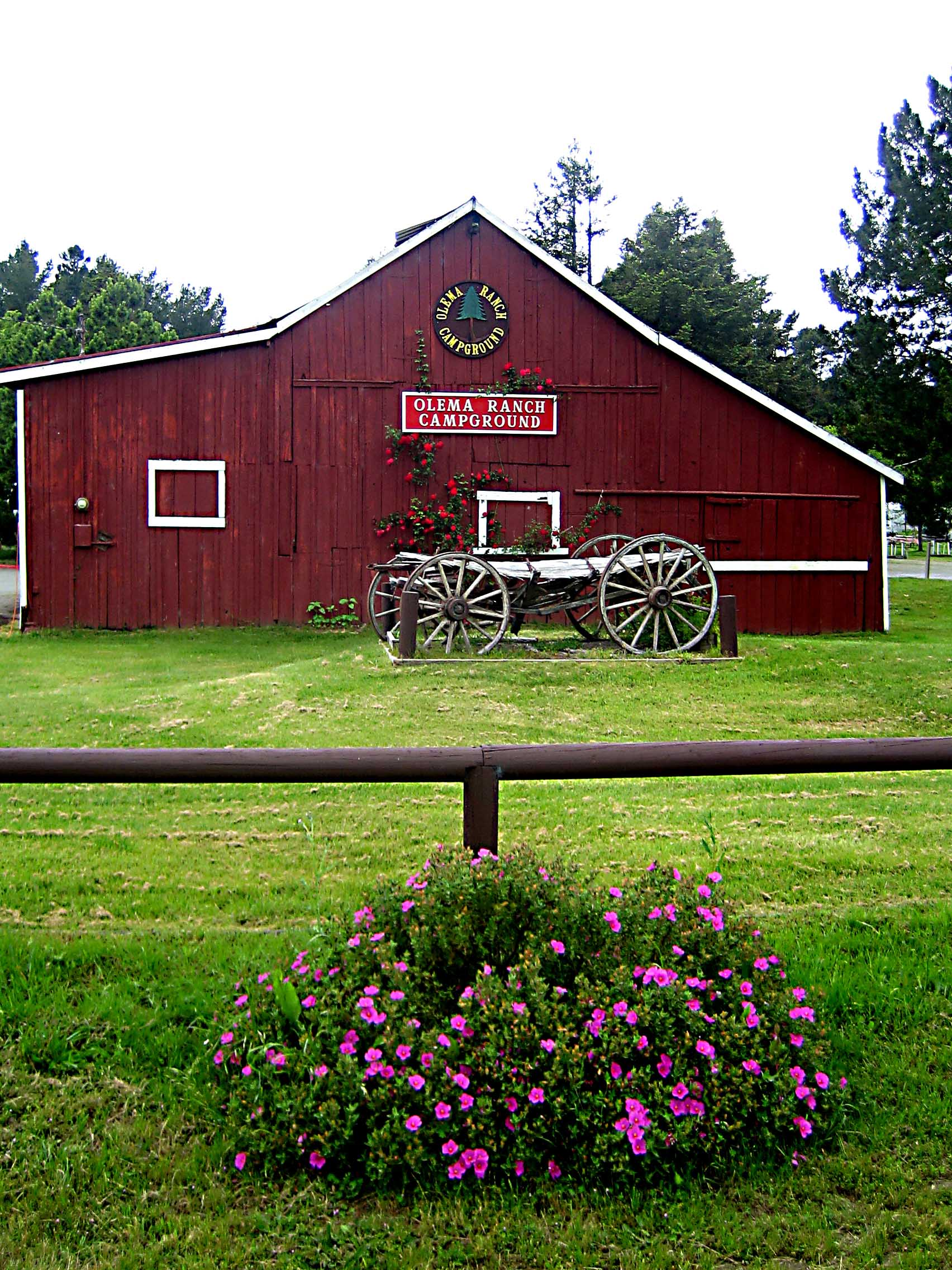
The Olema Ranch barn is adjacent to the inn

In 2006 the inn and restaurant went on the market for US$3.6 million.

In 2010 the Olema Inn was purchased by chefs Daniel DeLong and Margaret Grade, repainted from bright white to nearly black, and rechristened as Sir and Star at The Olema. Sir and Star is a portmanteau of Sir Francis Drake Boulevard and Star Route One.

In 2023, the restaurant closed for renovations and was expected to reopen by 2024, but it instead permanently closed after Grade died in a car accident.
