= Taylorville, California =

Taylorville
- Former settlement
- Location in California
- Coordinates: 38°01′45″N 122°44′27″W
- Country: United States
- State: California
- County: Marin
- Elevation: 141 ft (43 m)

Taylorville is a former settlement in Marin County, California, United States. It was located on the Northwestern Pacific Railroad 11 miles (18 km) west-southwest of downtown Novato, at an elevation of 141 feet (43 m). Taylorville still appeared on maps as of 1914.

Taylorville had a post office, a tannery, a gun powder factory, a water-powered paper mill, then later a steam-driven mill. It also had an orchard, cattle ranch and was serviced by train from 1875 until 1933. Camp Taylor, on the same property had a hotel, a dance hall, two bowling alleys, boating on the creek, hunting and fishing. As many as 3000 people would visit on popular weekends.

The name honors Samuel P. Taylor, founder of the first paper mill on the West Coast.
