= Richard Waters =

American artist (1935–2013)

Richard A. Waters (September 19, 1935 – July 4, 2013) was an American painter, sculptor, and musical instrument inventor. His instruments are used in a wide-range of popular films and TV, including The Matrix, Star Trek: The Motion Picture, Poltergeist, Crouching Tiger, Hidden Dragon, and Let The Right One In.

He is most well known for inventing the waterphone, an instrument that Waters designed as part of a series of "musical inventions, sound devices, and sonic sculptures". Waters hand-sculpted over 1000 waterphones over the course of his career, many going on to be used in the film soundtracks which brought the instrument its acclaim.

== Early Life & Education ==
Waters was born on September 19, 1935 in Gulfport, Mississippi.

His first lesson in watercolor was from his mother at age 11, whilst they were living in Bermuda.

He lived on the Mississippi Gulf Coast in the 1950s-60s where his parents, Dick and Gladys Waters, owned the Gulf Hills Dude Ranch in Ocean Springs until 1962. During this time, he developed an appreciation for the arts due to the constant exposure. His mother, Gladys, was involved in hiring artists including Walter Anderson for murals at the ranch, where musicians performed most evenings.

He graduated with a Bachelor of Arts in Fine Art from the University of Southern Mississippi in 1961. He swapped majors 5 times before settling on painting - an indecision which surely helped develop his multi-disciplinary skills. After graduating, Waters worked at Jack Tar Hotels. He painted late at night after his hotel shifts but felt unhappy without the time to focus on it. He eventually resigned from his position as assistant manager in Biloxi, and relocated to California to pursue a career in art.

Waters first tried to find work as a painter in Los Angeles, but found the saturated art scene there difficult to break into. After running out of money, but not motivation, he lived on a "half sunken houseboat" in Sausalito. In order to save money for his further education, Waters worked as a dishwasher at Juanita’s Gallery at Gate 5.

In 1963, Walters enrolled in the California College of Arts and Crafts, feeling he needed further formal training, receiving his Master of Fine Arts in 1965. Waters exceptional skill was recognized when he won the 1965 Lytton Award in Painting, and his work bought him much happiness.

Waters then moved to Dania, Florida to set up his painting and sculpture studio. He had multiple successful exhibits in Miami and Fort Lauderdale, which won awards.

In Pass Christian, Waters envisioned, designed and completed a hurricane-proof house, hoping to use his unique skills to keep people safe. In 1969, his invention withstood Hurricane Camille, influencing local building codes which used his design as a model. He notes that Hurricane Katrina eventually destroyed the house - though this was at least 25 years later, in 2005.

In the late 1960s, he returned to California, where his focus moved into sound sculpture and unique audio devices. He first rented a studio in Sausalito whilst living in Lagunitas, before moving to Fairfax to set up a painting studio and hot-metal workshop in an old barn.

In later reflections, Waters described his unusual role in art as “split between making musical instruments and painting" stating that "it seems to fit well as I do not like doing any one thing all of the time.” This combination of seemingly scattered interests and skills being channeled into sound is what eventually led him to invent the Waterphone.

Whilst living in California, he showed and sold watercolors through a gallery in Ocean Springs, Mississippi. In the early 1970s, Waters purchased a studio on a 2.5 acre plot near Sebastopol. He spent most of his time engaged in his creative work, painting during the day and performing in experimental bands at night.

== Painting & Sculpture ==
Whilst studying for his MFA, Waters expanded from traditional painting into his distinctive "three-dimensional paintings" (fiberglass wall reliefs) and sculptures.

His works around this time also included oil paintings on the themes of figurative and abstract expressionism.

Throughout his career, Waters' 2D painting work focused on Watercolor and Giclée techniques. His Giclée work was usually produced in runs of 50 with archival quality paper and inks. His watercolors were usually "full sheet (22 x 30)", though some were smaller.

Waters enjoyed painting many natural scenes, including Mississippi Bayous, California hills and coasts, Hawaii landscapes, Roatán landscapes, and foggy scenes. He also ventured into the abstract, using multiple techniques to create colorful paintings and mandalas.

In the late 1980s, Waters experimented with computer graphics, creating artworks including bamboo drawings, abstract pieces, and landscapes.

He co-founded the influential Sausalito Arts Festival, serving as the chair of its sculpture department.

== Experimental Sound & Music Performance ==
As both a musician and an inventor, Waters used his Waterphone often as a central part of his experimental sound design and art. As a member of the experimental music group The Gravity Adjusters, Waters used the Waterphone as a central part of their performances.

He released two self-produced CD Albums, "Water Dreams" and "One". These albums document his 40 year study into sound, featuring his unique “adventuresome, cross genre music on new musical inventions and sound devices" and "the best music from several ensembles I played and performed in during my San Francisco Bay Area years.”

In the context of soundtracks, Waters' instruments are well known for their eerie atonal dissonance and theatrically textural sounds. His instruments were also used in a variety of music genres including symphonies, jazz, and world music. Waters was also a prolific performer, playing the Waterphone as a member of the Gravity Adjusters Expansion Band.

In 2009, he featured his Waterphone alongside film maker David Mihalak's quartet Ghost In the House.

== Waterphone ==
The Waterphone is an atonal musical instrument which was invented by Richard Waters in the late 1960s, and was patented in 1975 (US Patent No. 3896696).

Waters produced over 1000 Waterphones during his career, developing a number of variations on the original form. One such variation was the "Revolving Sound Generator", an oversized waterphone which was either suspended or used on a pivoting stand, and is a great example of the versatility of the instruments form.

Other models included Small, Standard, Wide Range Flat Bottom, Ultra Light, and a Bass; though these were later consolidated into the Whaler, Bass, and MegaBass.

He suggested some specific techniques for using the Waterphone to create different textures. Handheld Waterphones could be used as "hand water drums" when used underwater. He also suggested using "hand bowing" to call whales and other cetaceans, or dragging a "superball mallet" across the bottom of the pan for eerie 'nails-on-chalkboard' friction tones.

According to his website, many musicians traveled long distances to purchase instruments directly from Waters. The Waterphone was undeniably popular, and remains an integral part of many symphonies to this day.

== Legacy ==
Waters died on July 4, 2013, in Gulfport, Mississippi, aged 77. He served on the board of directors for both the Hawaii and Northern California chapters of the American Bamboo Society, according to his obituary.

Waters and his work were commemorated with the Richard Waters New Music Festival, held at the Berkeley Arts Festival in the San Francisco Bay Area.

Many sources still write about the lasting impact of the waterphone. The Guardian included it amongst cinema’s “unlikely soundtracks,” whilst Nerdist described it as the “soundtrack to your nightmares.”

Waters’ daughter, novelist Rayme Waters, has organized performances in his honor, and musician Brooks Hubbert continues to produce waterphones using Waters’ original methods.
