= Bon Tempe Lake =

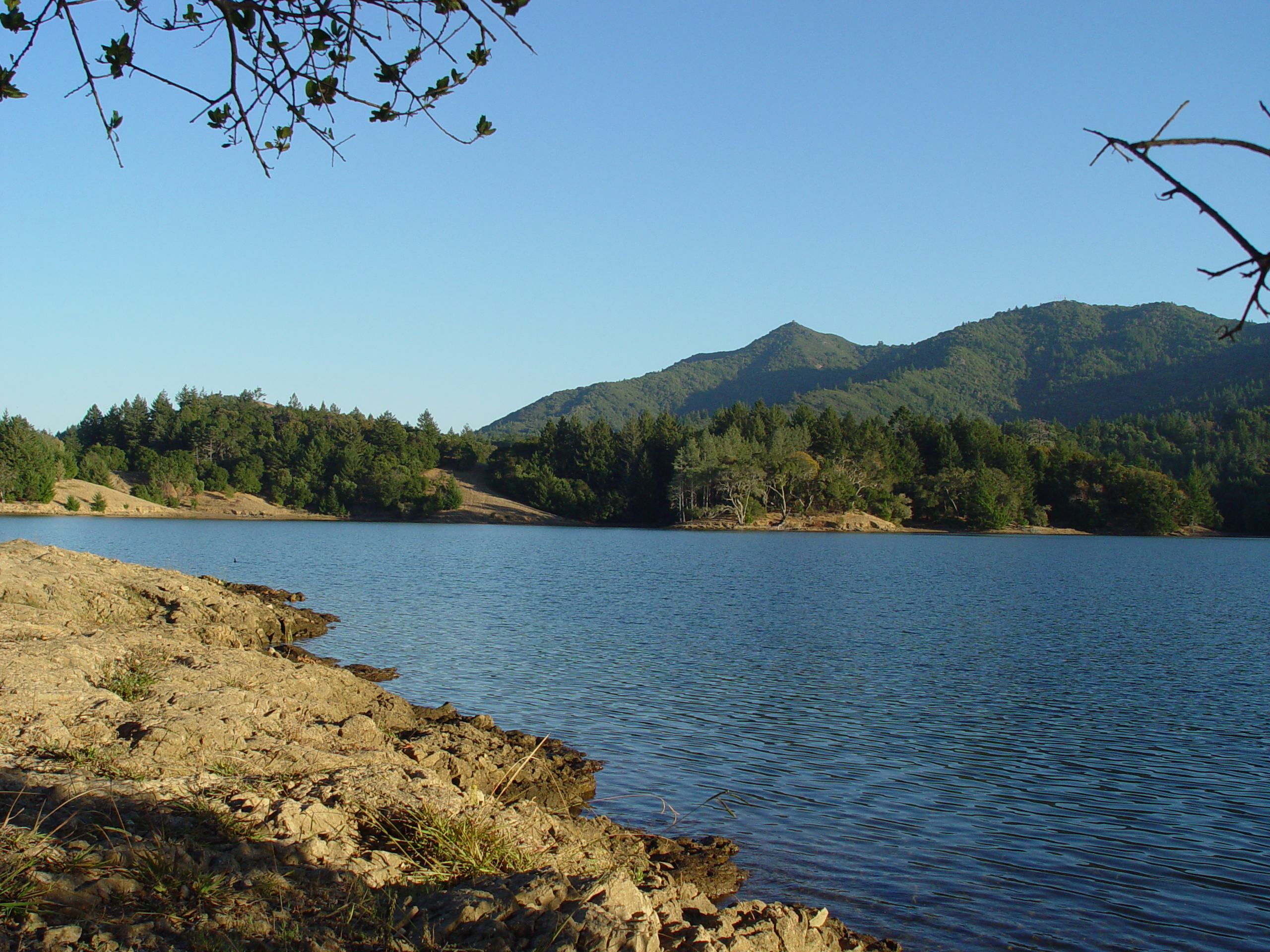

- Location within California Location within the United States
- Location: Marin County, California
- Coordinates: 37°57′21″N 122°36′40″W
- Type: Reservoir
- Primary inflows: Lagunitas Creek
- Primary outflows: Lagunitas Creek
- Basin countries: United States
- Surface elevation: 718 ft (219 m)

Bon Tempe Lake is a reservoir in Marin County, California, managed by the Marin Municipal Water District. It is the widest lake in the Mount Tamalpais watershed, and on Lagunitas Creek. Beneath its dam is Alpine Lake. Lake Lagunitas is immediately to its east.

Built in 1948 (78 years ago), with the construction of the earthen Bon Tempe Dam, the lake's name is an Americanization of the Bautunpi family name. The Bautunpi brothers ran a ranch and dairy that was removed with the creation of Bon Tempe and Alpine reservoirs.

Fishing and hiking are activities around the lake. Rainbow trout and both largemouth and smallmouth bass are caught in the lake. The California Office of Environmental Health Hazard Assessment released a warning regarding eating fish caught from this lake based on the elevated mercury level.

== See also ==
- List of dams and reservoirs in California
- List of lakes in California
- List of lakes in the San Francisco Bay Area
