= Samuel P. Taylor State Park =

State park in California, United States

- IUCN category III (natural monument or feature)
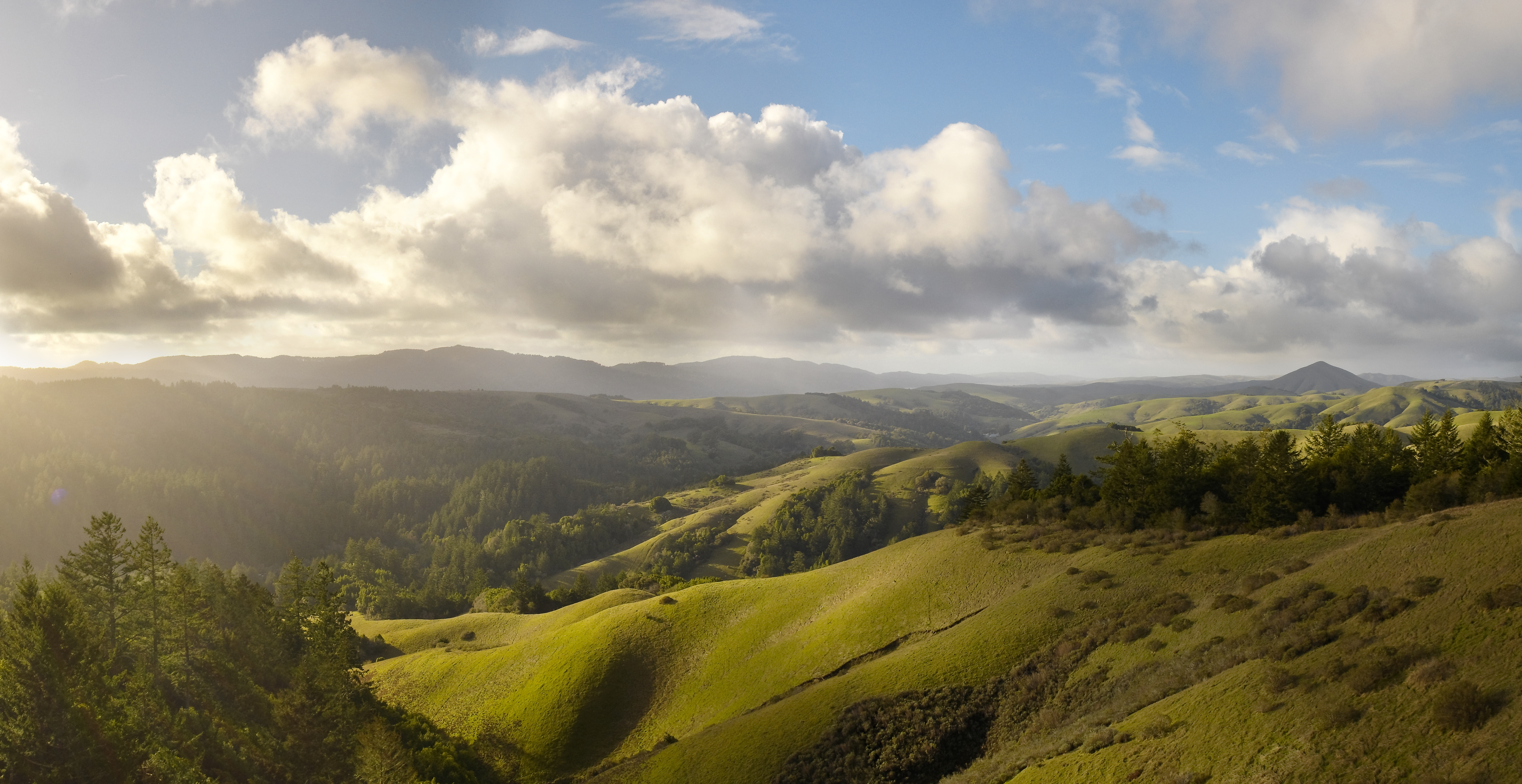
- The view from Barnabe Peak
- Interactive map of Samuel P. Taylor State Park
- Location: Marin County, California, U.S.
- Coordinates: 38°1′42″N 122°43′0″W
- Area: 2,700 acres (11 km^{2})
- Established: 1945
- Governing body: California State Parks

Pioneer Paper Mill site
- Interactive map of Pioneer Paper Mill site
- Location: Samuel P. Taylor State Park, Lagunitas, California
- Built: 1856
- Architect: Samuel Penfield Taylor
- Architectural style: Paper Mill

California Historical Landmark
- Reference no.: 552

Samuel P. Taylor State Park is a state park located in Marin County, California, United States, which includes approximately 2,700 acres (11 km^{2}) of redwood forest and grassland. The park contains about 600 acres (2.4 km^{2}) of old-growth forest, some of which can be seen along the Pioneer Tree Trail. Part of the natural area is old-growth forest and recognized by Old-Growth Forest Network.

== History ==
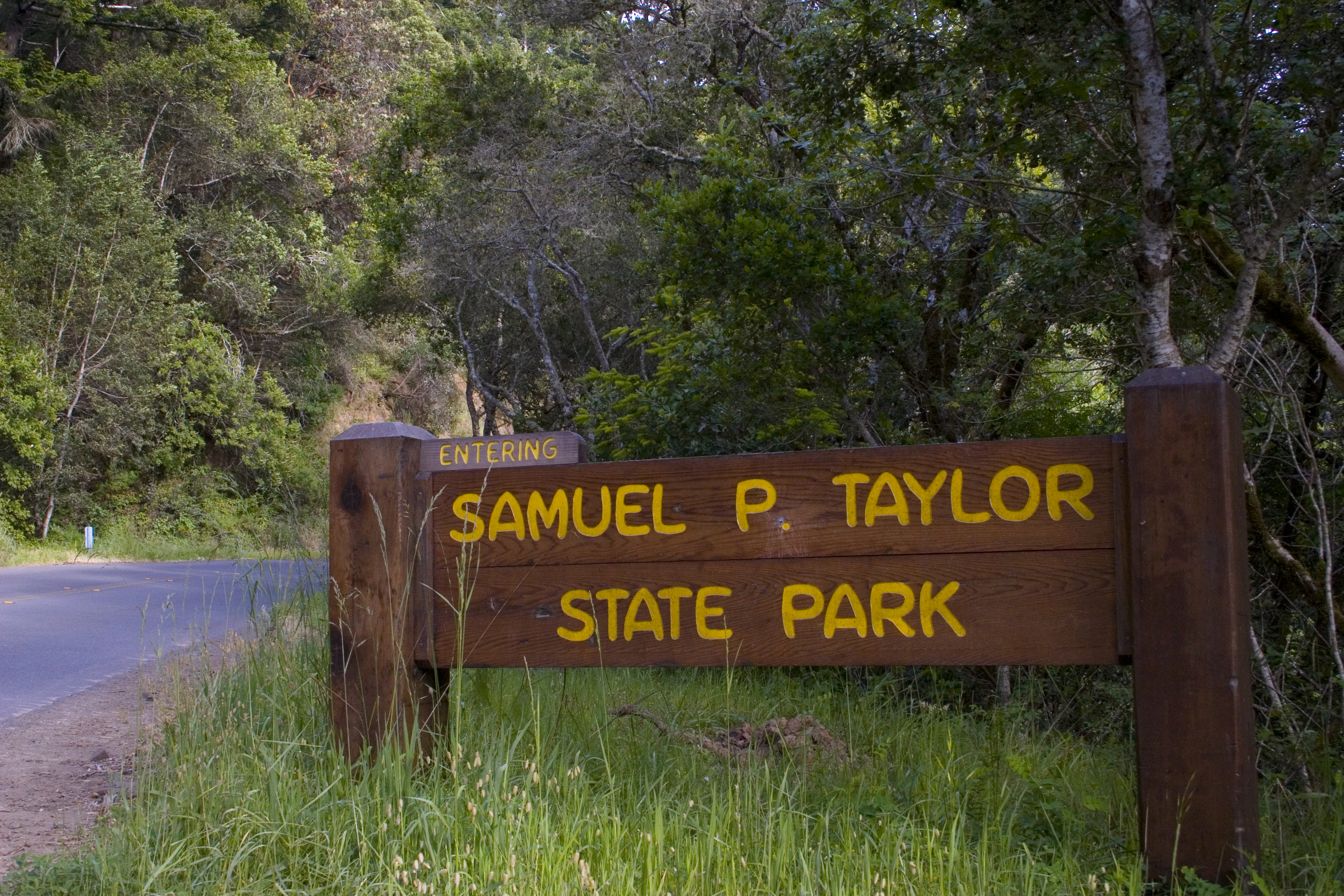
Park sign from the western entrance along Sir Francis Drake Boulevard

The park is named for Samuel Penfield Taylor, who found gold during the California Gold Rush and used some of his money to buy a parcel of land along Lagunitas Creek. In 1856, Taylor built the Pioneer Paper Mill, the first paper mill on the Pacific Coast. In the 1870s, the North Pacific Coast Railroad was built between Cazadero and a pier in Sausalito where passengers could transfer to a ferry to San Francisco. The railroad passed near Taylor's mill, and, ever the entrepreneur, he built the "Camp Taylor Resort" alongside the tracks. A destination for San Franciscans, the resort offered both a hotel and tent camping, as well as swimming, boating, fishing, and a dance pavilion.

Taylor died on January 22, 1886, and his family lost the mill and resort in the Panic of 1893. However, a 1910 newspaper advertisement for the "Camp Taylor Resort", touting its dance pavilion and on-site grocery and butcher, indicates that the resort continued to operate. The mill burned down in 1916, and in 1945 the State of California took possession of the property for non-payment of taxes.

During the state budget deficit, Taylor Park was one of many state parks that were at risk of closing due to lack of funding. Efforts were made to find funding to keep Samuel P. Taylor and other parks open. The San Francisco Chronicle, on October 6, 2011, reported that "the National Park Service has agreed to take over security and operations of Samuel P. Taylor Park."

== See also ==
- California Historical Landmarks in Marin County
