= Olema Creek =

Stream in California, US

Olema Creek Arroyo Olemus Loke
- Location of mouth
- Etymology: Olemake is Coast Miwok, Arroyo Olemus Loke a mix of Miwok and Spanish
- Native name: Olemaloke (Coast Miwok)

Location
- Country: United States
- State: California
- Region: Marin County, California

Physical characteristics
- Source: Western slope of Bolinas Ridge
  - location: 2.5 mi (4 km) southwest of Gilroy
  - coordinates: 37°58′37″N 122°42′27″W
  - elevation: 1,350 ft (410 m)
- Mouth: Confluence with Lagunitas Creek, 2.5 miles (4.0 km) south of Tomales Bay
  - location: Southwest Point Reyes Station, California
  - coordinates: 38°03′51″N 122°48′40″W
  - elevation: 3 ft (0.91 m)
- Length: 9 mi (14 km)

Olema Creek is a 12.7-mile-long (20.4 km) northwestward-flowing stream originating on the western flank of Bolinas Ridge, which is part of the Marin Hills, part of the Pacific Coast Ranges mountain system in California, United States. Olema Creek flows to Lagunitas Creek and thence to Tomales Bay and the Pacific Ocean.

== History ==
Olema is probably the name of a Coast Miwok village named "Olemos" or "Olemus" in the baptismal records of Mission Dolores after 1802.

== Watershed and Course ==
The Olema Creek watershed is 14.7 square miles (38 km^{2}), and is the largest undammed tributary of Lagunitas Creek. It flows northwesterly through the Olema Valley along the San Andreas Fault Zone. The creek flows through the small towns of Five Brooks, Olema, and Point Reyes Station where Olema Creek ends at its confluence with Lagunitas Creek.

The downstream reach of Olema Creek historically meandered through the Olema Marsh until the early 1920s. Subsequent channel straightening near its mouth increased the stream velocity leading to channel incision several meters below its floodplain. After Olema Creek passes below Sir Francis Drake Boulevard (aka Levee Road) it joins Lagunitas Creek.

== Ecology and Conservation ==
The Olema Creek watershed is 99% on National Park Service lands, although 56% of this is under grazing leases.

Olema Creek hosts anadromous coho salmon (Oncorhynchus kisutch) which are federally endangered Central California Coast coho salmon evolutionary significant unit ESU, and steelhead trout (Oncorhynchus mykiss) which are federally threatened Central California Coast Steelhead distinct population segment (DPS). Nineteen percent of the coho salmon spawning in the Lagunitas Creek watershed takes place in Olema Creek. Olema Creek coho salmon were used to genetically rescue Russian River coho salmon suffering from inbreeding depression, resulting in higher fitness of this endangered salmonid in the Russian River.

Olema Creek also hosts multiple other listed species: California freshwater shrimp (Syncharis pacifica), tidewater goby (Eucyclogobius newberryi) and California red-legged frog (Rana draytonii). On September 10, 2025, National Park Service biologist Michael Reichmuth, captured the first ever photographs in the wild of California giant salamander (Dicamptodon ensatus) larvae while snorkeling Olema Creek.
