= Olema, California =

Unincorporated community in California, United States

Olema
- Unincorporated community
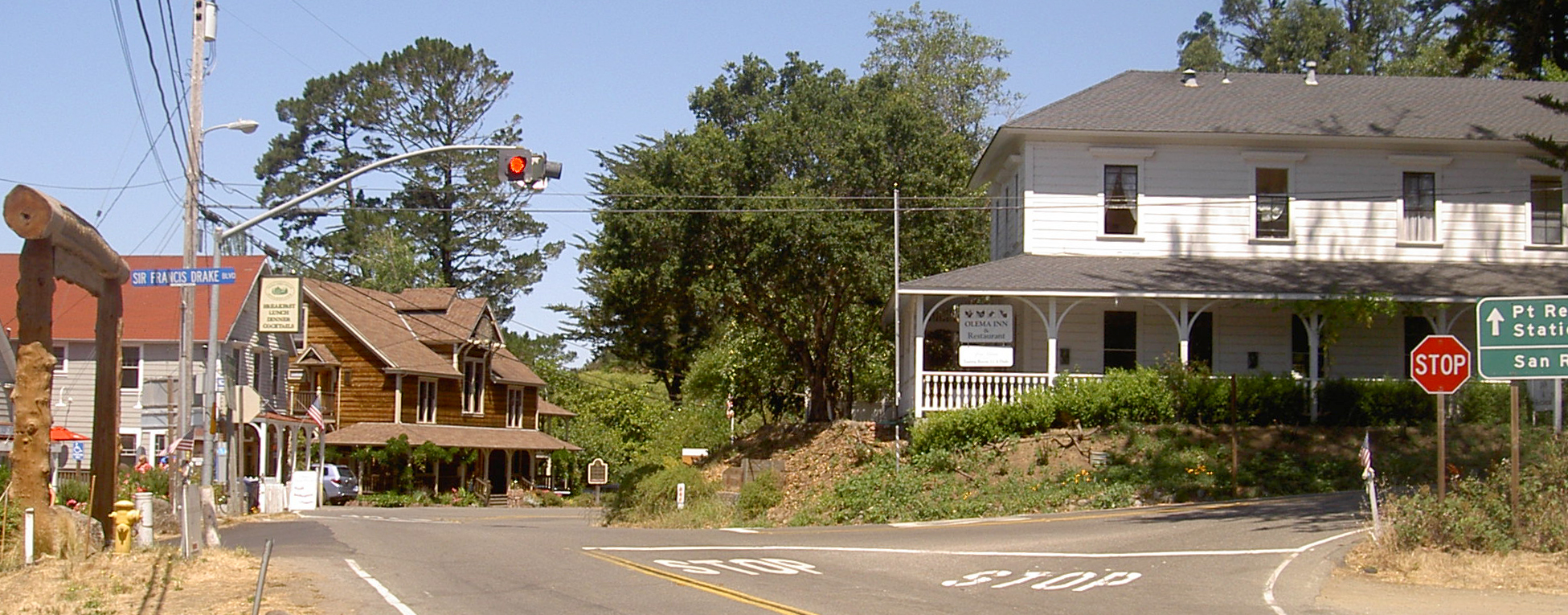
- View northbound on SR 1 at Sir Francis Drake Blvd.

- Location in California Olema (the United States)
- Coordinates: 38°02′27″N 122°47′17″W
- Country: United States
- State: California
- County: Marin County
- Elevation: 69 ft (21 m)
- ZIP code: 94950
- Area codes: 415/628
- FIPS code: 06-53630
- GNIS feature ID: 1659297

Olema (Miwok: Olemaloke) is an unincorporated community in Marin County, California, United States. It is located on Olema Creek, 2.25 miles (3.6 km) south-southeast of Point Reyes Station, at an elevation of 69 feet (21 m).

Olema is along State Route 1 at its intersection with Sir Francis Drake Boulevard, on the eastern edge of the Point Reyes Peninsula in the western part of Marin County. The name Olema comes from the Coast Miwok placename meaning "coyote valley".

Olema was once thought to be the epicenter of the 1906 San Francisco earthquake because the San Andreas Fault runs in very close proximity to the town, and due to the huge rifts surrounding the fault that are still visible via a nearby hiking path. There are historical references to this in and around the town, including at shops and restaurants. However, more recent evidence suggests that a location offshore of Daly City is more likely the epicenter.

Olema was the title subject of the late-1960s country-rock song "Hippie from Olema", The Youngbloods' rejoinder to Merle Haggard's "Okie from Muskogee".

The Olema post office opened in 1859, closed in 1860, and reopened in 1864.

== Attractions ==
Olema has a few shops, two restaurants (Sir and Star and Due West), a lodge, and several bed and breakfasts. Nearby is a large campground and also a large retreat for the Vedanta Society (a branch of Hinduism). Also, the Bear Valley Visitor Center, a quarter-mile from town on Bear Valley Road, provides a standard starting point for a visit to the Point Reyes National Seashore. Inside the center are exhibits and books for sale. Outside are picnic tables, a Morgan horse ranch, and Kule Loklo, a reconstructed Miwok village.

== Politics ==
In the state legislature, Olema is in the 3rd Senate District and in the 6th Assembly District.

Federally, Olema is in California's 2nd congressional district, represented by Democrat Jared Huffman.

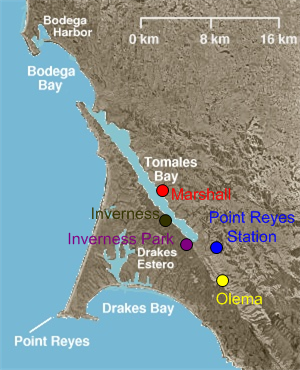
Towns of rural western Marin County. Olema is in yellow.
