= Alpine Lake (Marin County, California) =

Reservoir in Marin County, California

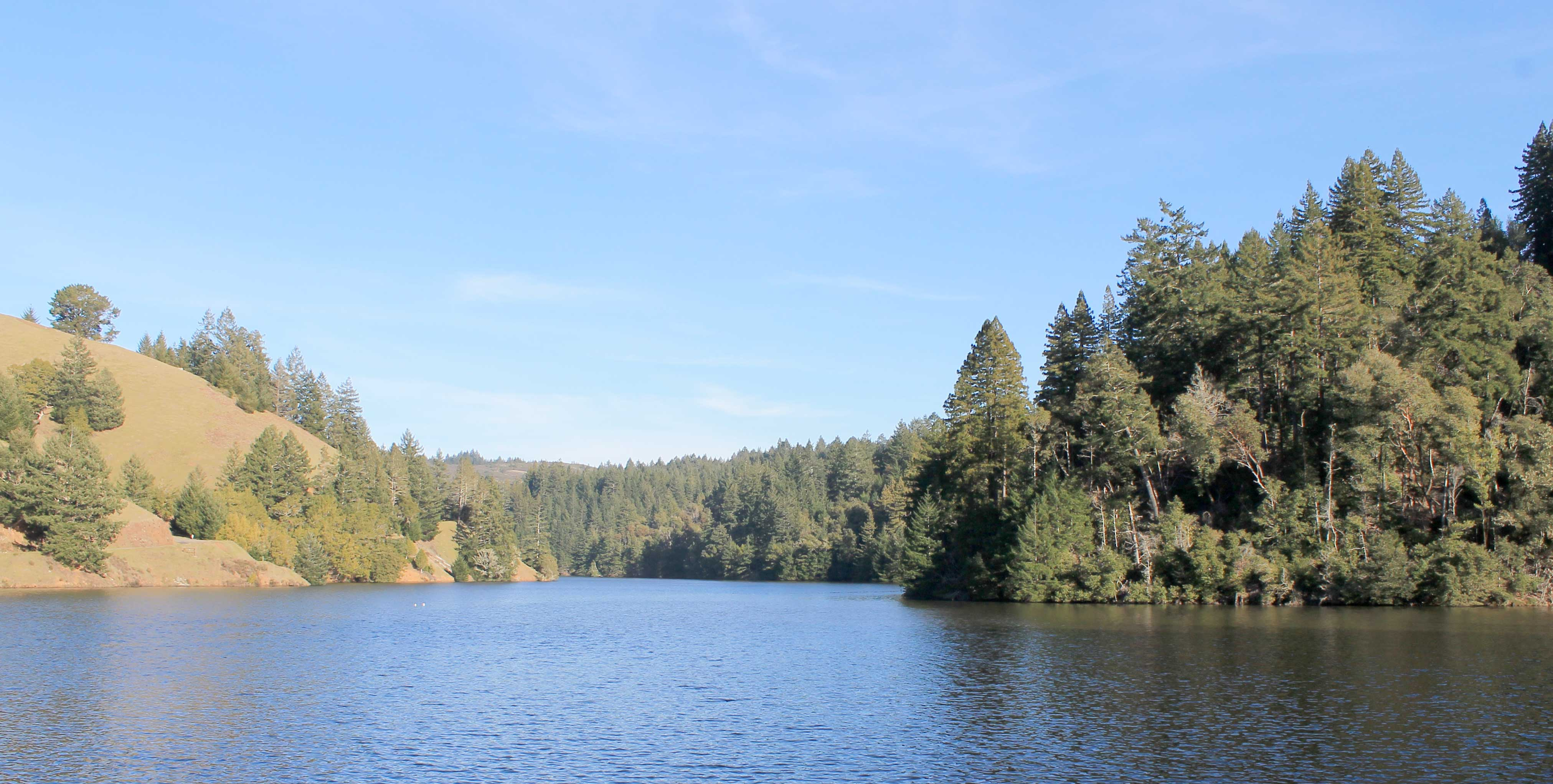
- the lake in 2013, viewed from Alpine Dam

- Location within California Location within the United States
- Location: Marin County, California
- Coordinates: 37°56′25″N 122°38′17″W
- Type: Reservoir
- Primary outflows: Lagunitas Creek
- Catchment area: 10.2 square miles (26 km^{2})
- Basin countries: United States
- Surface area: 224 acres (91 ha)
- Water volume: 8,892 acre-feet (10,968,000 m^{3})
- Surface elevation: 646 ft (197 m)

Alpine Lake is a reservoir in Marin County, California. Formed by Alpine Dam, it provides water to the Marin Municipal Water District. Below the dam lies Kent Lake. Alpine Lake is to the west of Bon Tempe Lake. Fishing is allowed, and Largemouth Bass, Smallmouth Bass, and trout can be caught. Boats and wading are not allowed on the lake.

== Alpine Dam ==
Alpine Dam (national ID number: CA00204) is a gravity dam which was completed in 1917 (109 years ago). It is 524 feet (160 m) long and 143 feet (44 m) high, with 8 feet (2.4 m) of freeboard.

In 1912, the Marin Municipal Water District, serving San Rafael, the Ross Valley and all of southern Marin, was the first municipal water district to be created in California. One of district's first tasks was to build Alpine Dam to provide drinking water for the county's growing population.

The dam was designed with consultation provided by Michael O’Shaughnessy, who was, at the time, a board member of the district. Construction on Alpine started in the summer of 1917, but the outbreak of World War I led to shortages of labor and materials for the contractor.

In January 1918 district took over the building of Alpine Dam and construction was completed a year later. When first built, the reservoir held just over a billion gallons of water, but the dam was raised in 1924 and again in 1941. The reservoir now has a capacity approaching 3 billion gallons and continues to play a vital role in supplying fresh water to thousands of people in the district.

== Hiking ==
Kent Trail along Alpine Lake : A trail that takes place just off the shores of Alpine Lake, up through a redwood forest onto a manzanita-covered ridge with great views. −Distance: 5.2-mile lollipop loop −Difficulty: Moderate −Dogs: Allowed on leash

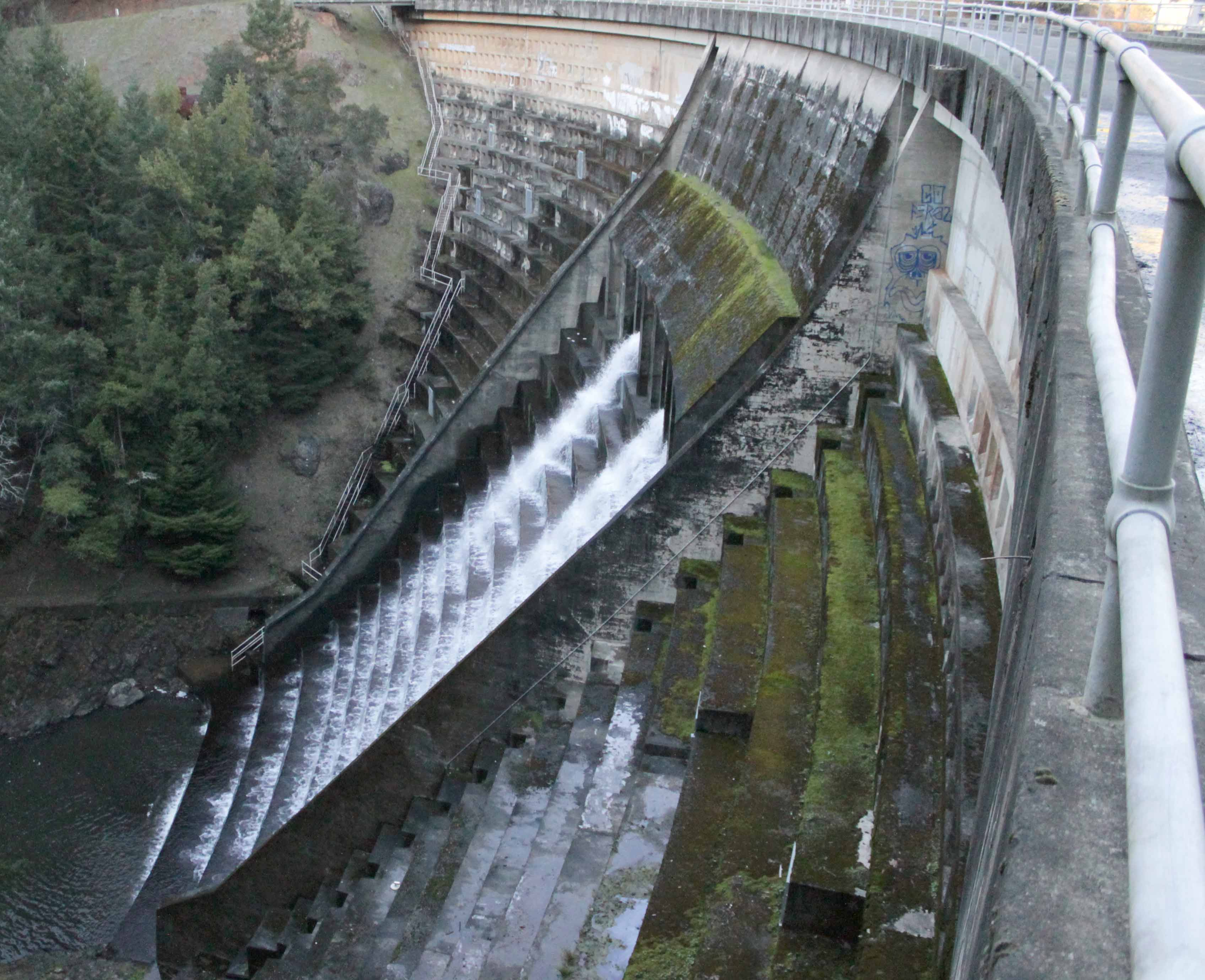
Alpine Dam and its spillway in 2013

== See also ==
- Lake Alpine
- List of dams and reservoirs in California
- List of lakes in California
- List of lakes in the San Francisco Bay Area
