= Shutter ridge =

A shutter ridge is a ridge that has moved along a fault line, blocking or diverting drainage. Typically, a shutter ridge creates a valley corresponding to the alignment of the fault that produces it. Shutter ridges occur exclusively at strike-slip faults.

== Example Locations ==
- Oakland, California
- Dragon's Back, Carrizo Plain, CA
