= Nicasio Creek =

- Nicasio Creek

Location
- Country: United States
- State: California
- Region: Marin County
- District: West Marin

Physical characteristics
- Source: Big Rock Ridge
  - location: 4 mi (6 km) southwest of Novato
  - coordinates: 38°3′42″N 122°37′37″W
  - elevation: 1,030 ft (310 m)
- Mouth: Lagunitas Creek
  - location: 2 mi (3 km) east of Point Reyes Station
  - coordinates: 38°4′12″N 122°46′12″W
  - elevation: 33 ft (10 m)

Nicasio Creek is an 11.9-mile-long (19.2 km) stream in Marin County, California, United States and is the primary tributary of Lagunitas Creek. It flows in turn into Tomales Bay and the Pacific Ocean. The Nicasio Reservoir, formed in 1961 by Seeger Dam is located on this stream.

== History ==
Nicasio Creek and the Rancho Nicasio are probably named for a Coast Miwok named "Nicasio" by the Spanish missionaries. The original diseno for the 1835 and 1844 land grants shows Arroyo de Nicasio, Casa de los Indios de Nicasio, and Roblar de Nicasio for Nicasio Creek, the house of the Nicasio Indians, and the oaks of Nicasio.

In the mid-1830s, General Mariano Vallejo promised 80,000 acres (324 km^{2}) to the Marin County Coast Miwok Indians and asked them to choose the lands, since their original lands had been co-opted by the Mission San Rafael. In 1835, the land was granted by the Mexican Governor José Figueroa, however, the Indians were subsequently swindled out of the land by General Vallejo and Governor Juan Bautista Alvarado. By the time the scheme was discovered in 1843, the disputed lands were quietly granted to Pablo de la Guerra, an aristocratic Spaniard, and John B. R. Cooper, an Irishman who already owned the Rancho Punta de Quentin near San Rafael. In 1855, the Miwok claim was rejected by the Public Land Commission. Subsequently, de la Guerra sold his land in 1850 to Henry Wager Halleck. Halleck had arrived in California in 1847 as a lieutenant in the United States Engineers, accompanied by his friend, Lt. William Tecumseh Sherman. Halleck was a partner in the San Francisco law firm, Halleck, Peachy & Billings, and in the Civil War was promoted by President Abraham Lincoln to general-in-chief of the armies of the United States. Halleck hunted and fished at Rancho Nicasio, and built a house on the creek near Nicasio, now called Halleck Creek.

== Watershed and course ==
The Nicasio Creek watershed drains 36 square miles (93 km^{2}) of the coastal area of Marin County, California. This creek is the primary tributary of Lagunitas Creek which enters the Pacific Ocean at the head of Tomales Bay.

Originating on Big Rock Ridge west of the city of Novato, Nicasio Creek descends initially to the south. Approaching Lucas Valley Road, it turns and follows the road as it winds westward, passing south of Skywalker Ranch to the town of Nicasio. North of Nicasio, it feeds into Nicasio Reservoir just as Halleck Creek enters from the east. The reservoir drains to the west, through a gap in Bolinas Ridge. Seeger Dam is located approximately 1 mile (1.6 km) upstream from the confluence of Nicasio and Lagunitas Creeks. The dam was constructed in 1960 by the Marin Municipal Water District (MMWD) to store water for cities in southern Marin County. From the dam, Nicasio Creek parallels Point Reyes-Petaluma Road westward until it empties into Lagunitas Creek.

== Ecology ==
Before Seeger Dam presented an impassable barrier to anadromous fish passage, Nicasio Creek supported half of the steelhead trout (Oncorhynchus mykiss) and coho salmon (Oncorhynchus kisutch) spawning populations in the Lagunitas Creek watershed. By blockage and inundation the dam reduced by 50 percent of the salmon and steelhead populations entering Lagunitas Creek watershed. Author and landscape artist Russell Chatham wrote, "One of the most tragic sights I ever beheld was the year after Nicasio Dam blocked that critical watershed. An uncountable number of silvers, between 10,000 and 15,000, crowded into the mile from the gravel company to the base of the dam. They were so thick that many were forced out onto the banks, where they died without spawning." For mitigation, the Marin Municipal Water District initialled trapped inbound coho below the dam and transported them above the dam. By 1991, only 20 pairs of coho returned to spawn and none reached the trapping site below the dam. In addition, because the dam blocks sediment transport, there is a lack of suitable spawning gravel in the lower mile below the dam for spawning. Most spawning in the Lagunitas Creek watershed now takes place in San Geronimo Creek, an unregulated tributary, and the region immediately downstream of its confluence with Lagunitas Creek.

A river otter (Lontra canadensis) was collected by the Museum of Vertebrate Zoology at the southwest corner of Nicasio Reservoir in January, 2008.

== Bridges ==
There are at least two bridges spanning Nicasio Creek. Point Reyes-Petaluma Road crosses the creek in two places: once 3.47 miles (5.58 km) east of State Route 1 on a 133-foot (41 m) concrete continuous tee beam constructed in 1960, and again 3.2 miles (5.1 km) east of State Route 1 on a 102-foot (31 m) concrete tee beam built in 1937.

== See also ==
- List of watercourses in the San Francisco Bay Area
