= Samuel Penfield Taylor =

California entrepreneur (1827–1886)

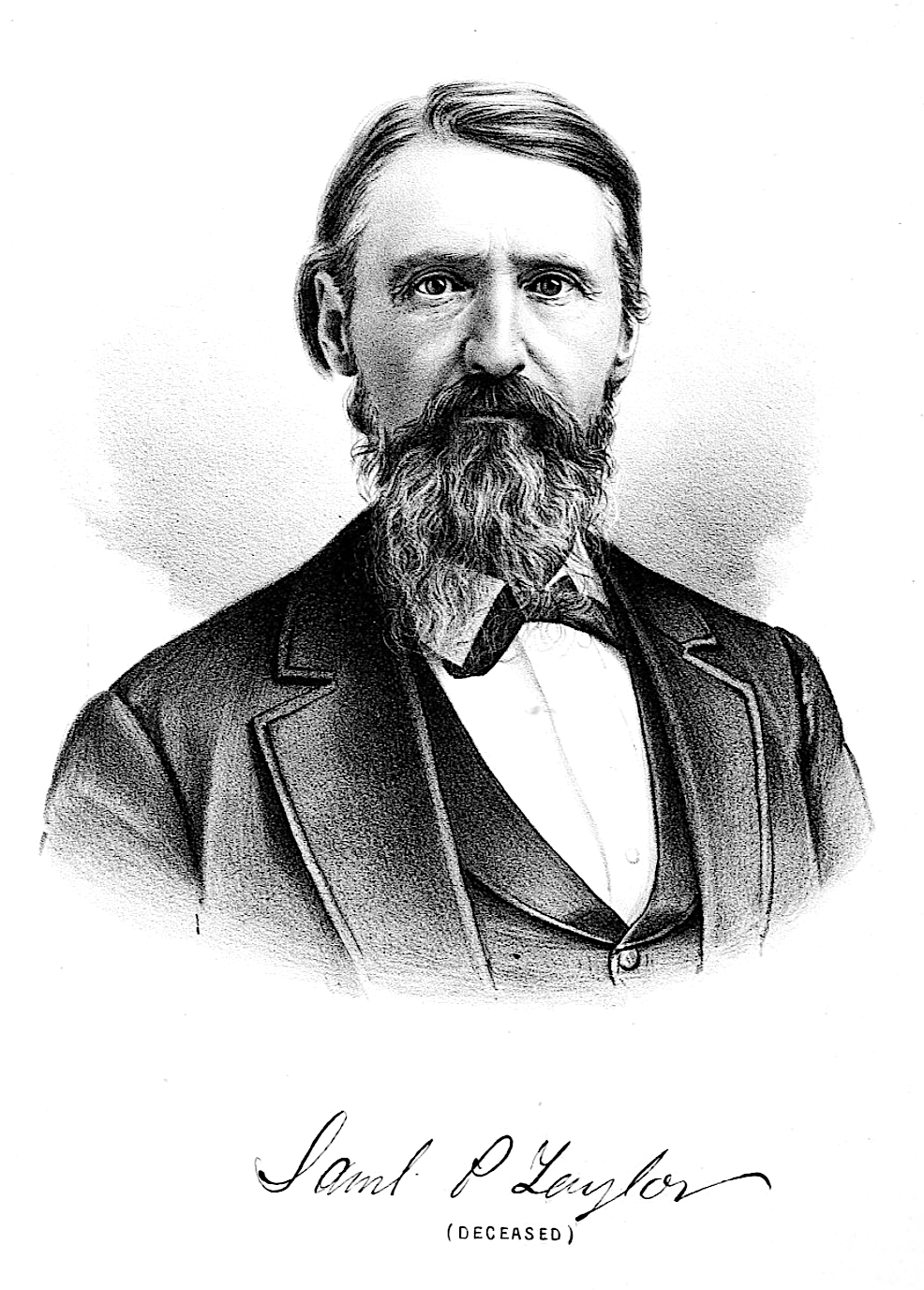
- Born: October 9, 1827; Saugerties, New York, U.S.
- Died: January 22, 1886 (aged 58); San Francisco, California, U.S.
- Other name: Samuel P. Taylor
- Spouse: Sarah Washington Irving
- Children: 8

Samuel Penfield Taylor (October 9, 1827 – January 22, 1886) was an American entrepreneur who made his fortune during the California Gold Rush. He is best known for building the Pioneer Paper Mill, the first paper mill in California. Taylor sailed from Boston Harbor in a schooner that he purchased with a group of friends, arriving in San Francisco ten months later.

Taylor's first business in California was a bacon and egg stand on the beach. "Upon arrival Taylor found a wooden cask of eggs floating near the shore. He cooked the eggs, overturned the cask, and set up a food stand on the beach." In 1853, Taylor left for Hawkins Bar, California, in Tuolumne County to prospect for gold. He used his profits to buy land in Marin County and enter the paper business.

Taylor was ahead of his time in producing recycled paper products from rags and old papers that his employees collected from various California cities and in creating the first fish ladder on the West Coast to help fish swim upstream around the dam near his paper mill. Taylor married Sarah Washington Irving, raised a family of seven boys and one girl, and served on the San Francisco Board of Supervisors. Working with other concerned citizens, Mr. and Mrs. Taylor helped stop the importation of Chinese slave girls into San Francisco.

After Taylor's death in 1886, his wife lost the paper mill and land around it in the Panic of 1893. The new owners of the Taylors' land (who refused to allow Sarah Taylor to be buried next to her husband on the family plot) lost the property themselves when it was taken by the State of California in 1945 for non-payment of taxes. The state then created Samuel P. Taylor State Park.

Taylor is buried on a hill overlooking the former site of the mill. His gravesite was restored in 1997 by Freemasons of San Francisco Oriental Lodge No. 144. Sarah Washington Irving now lies next to her husband on the southwest slope of Barnabe Mountain (near 38.0263°N 122.732°W).

== Genealogy ==
It has been claimed that Taylor was the grandson of George Taylor, a Pennsylvanian who signed the Declaration of Independence, and that Sarah Washington Irving was the favorite niece of writer and poet Washington Irving. In 2010, however, Judy Coy and George Stevens disputed these claims, providing evidence that Samuel Taylor's grandfather was Captain George Taylor Sr. of Catskill, Greene County, New York. Captain George Taylor Sr. was born August 15, 1756, in Glastonbury, Connecticut, the son of John and Mary Taylor, and died in New York City on July 4, 1831. Coy and Stevens further maintain that Sarah Washington Irving Taylor's parents were James W. Irving and Mary Doak of Providence, Rhode Island, and later of Fall River, Massachusetts (1850 census of Fall River).

There were many Sarahs in Washington Irving's family. His niece Sarah who lived with Irving until his death never married according to officials at his Sunnyside residence.

There is no record that Samuel P. Taylor ever claimed to be the grandson of the signer of the Declaration of Independence, nor that Sarah Washington Irving Taylor claimed to be the niece of Washington Irving. The earliest known written record of the claim is in Pioneering in Marin County, A Historical Recording by Bertha Stedman Rothwell, dated June 1959.

== See also ==
- California Historical Landmarks in Marin County
