= Nicasio Reservoir =

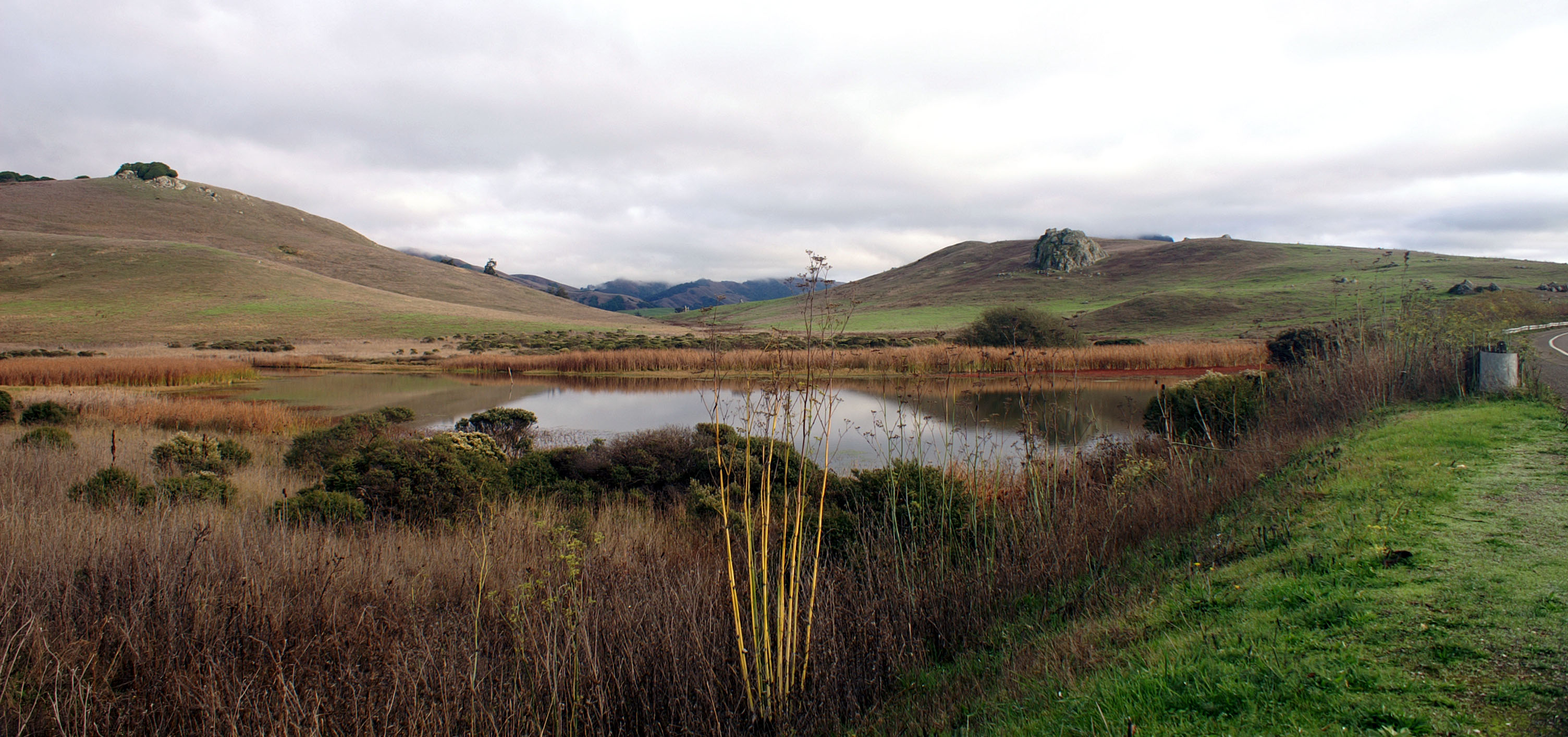
- Nicasio Reservoir seen from Nicasio Valley Road

- Location within California Location within the United States
- Location: Marin County, California
- Coordinates: 38°04′36″N 122°45′16″W
- Type: reservoir
- Primary inflows: Nicasio Creek
- Primary outflows: Nicasio Creek
- Basin countries: United States
- Surface area: 845 acres (3.42 km^{2})
- Water volume: 22,400 acre⋅ft (27,600,000 m^{3})
- Surface elevation: 144 ft (44 m)
- Settlements: Nicasio, California

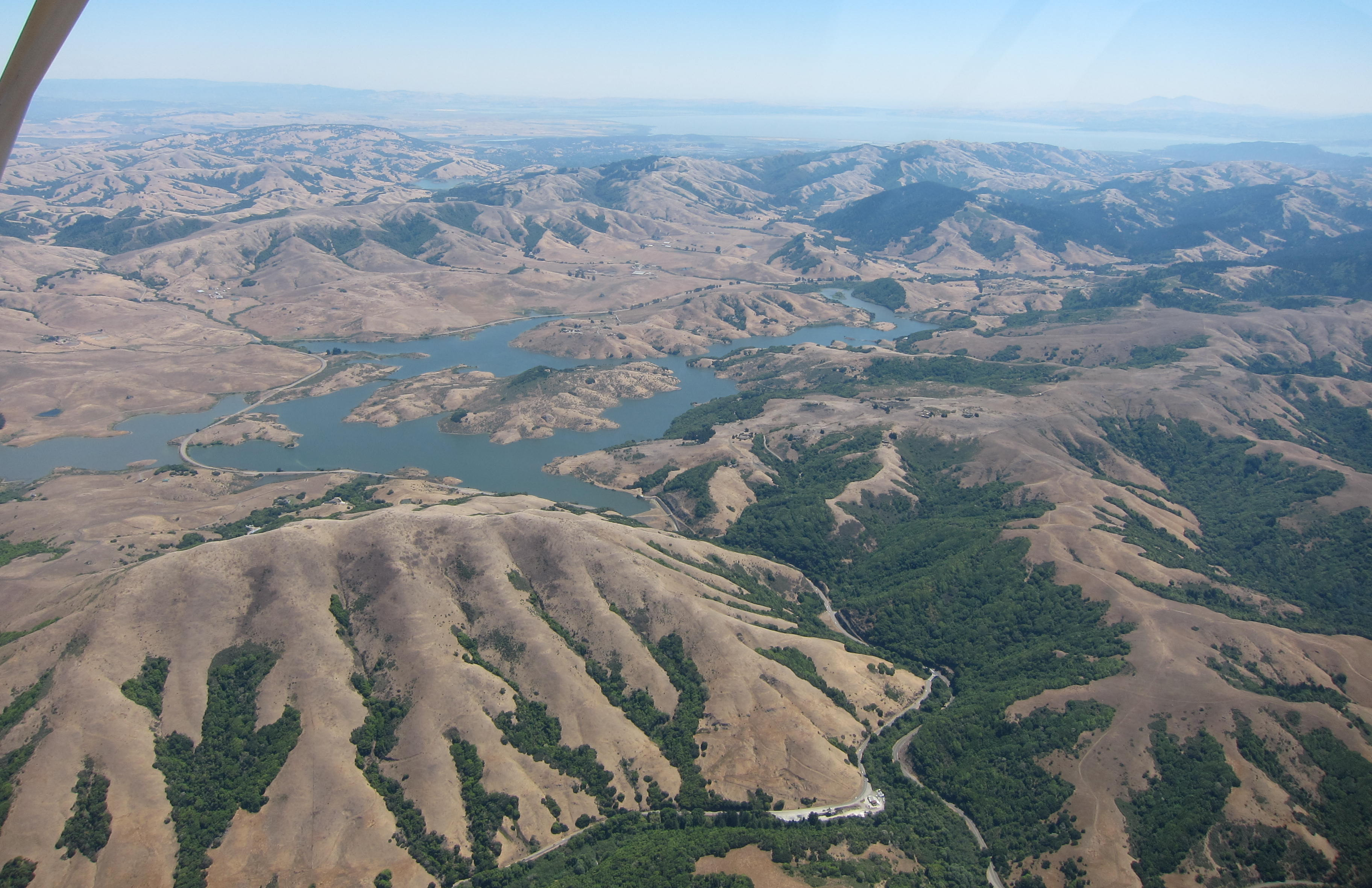
Nicasio Reservoir aerial, 2012

Nicasio Reservoir is a shallow, artificial reservoir in the Nicasio Valley region of Marin County, California, United States. It covers 845 acres (3.42 km^{2}) and sits in a 35.9 square miles (93 km^{2}) drainage basin. It was created by the construction of Seeger Dam on the Nicasio Creek in 1961 (65 years ago). Seeger Dam is a 115-foot (35 m) tall, 400-foot (120 m) long earthen dam owned by the Marin Municipal Water District.

== Controversy ==
The construction in the dam aroused much controversy among longtime residents of the area. The Water District forced the displacement of many farms, including the McIsaac family farm and the Tomasini Ranch, on which the majority of the reservoir sits. The controversy stems from the fact the water from the reservoir is rarely used by the Water District, that the broad and shallow nature of the reservoir leads to quick evaporation, and that the dam has blocked valuable spawning areas for endangered coho salmon and threatened steelhead trout. Construction of Seeger Dam wiped out the salmon population in Nicasio Creek. The District briefly and unsuccessfully attempted to trap salmon below the dam and transport them by truck further up Nicasio Creek and Halleck Creek.

== Ecology ==
A river otter (Lontra canadensis) was collected by the Museum of Vertebrate Zoology at the southwest corner of Nicasio Reservoir in January 2008.

== Recreational uses ==
The reservoir is used for recreational purposes; mainly fishing and hiking. Largemouth bass, carp and catfish are caught in the lake. There are problems with illegal poaching.

The California Office of Environmental Health Hazard Assessment (OEHHA) has developed a safe eating advisory for fish caught in Nicasio Reservoir based on levels of mercury or PCBs found in the fish species.

== See also ==
- List of lakes in California
- List of lakes in the San Francisco Bay Area
