= Kent Lake =

Reservoir in Marin County, California

- Location within California Location within the United States
- Location: Marin County, California
- Coordinates: 37°59′49″N 122°42′15″W
- Type: Reservoir
- Primary inflows: Lagunitas and Big Carson creeks
- Primary outflows: Lagunitas Creek
- Catchment area: 22.1 square miles (57 km^{2})
- Basin countries: United States
- Max. width: 700 ft (210 m)
- Surface area: 431 acres (174 ha)
- Water volume: 32,900 acre-feet (40,600,000 m^{3})
- Surface elevation: 404 ft (123 m)

Kent Lake is a reservoir in western Marin County, California formed by the construction of Peters Dam across Lagunitas Creek. Built in 1954 (72 years ago), the lake is the most recent lake of the Marin Municipal Water District, as well as the largest. It lies to the west of Alpine Lake; among the five major lakes in the area it is the only one to the west of Fairfax-Bolinas Road. It is named for the longtime president of the Marin Municipal Water District, Thomas Kent, the son of William Kent.

== Geography ==
Of the four reservoirs on the Lagunitas Creek mainstem, Kent Lake is the lowest and northernmost. Its named tributaries are Lagunitas Creek, then Little Carson Creek and Big Carson Creek, the latter two wrapping around Pine Mountain to the east.

== Access ==
An easy hike to the lake is available from the Leo T. Cronin Fish Viewing Area on Sir Francis Drake Blvd. Unlike the other lakes in the area, Kent Lake has almost no hiking trails around it. By automobile, major access points to the area include parking to the southeast off the Bolinas Fairfax road, or from the northwest, with seasonal parking off Sir Francis Drake Blvd or in one of the pullouts along the road. Minor access points include the dam at the southwestern point of Alpine Lake on the Bolinas Fairfax road. Despite the lack of trails, Kent Lake can be traversed or accessed by foot, bike, or horse from unpaved roads such as Pine Mountain road, which runs to the highest elevation, Kent Pump road which runs from the Alpine Lake dam down to the lake at low elevation, or Continental Cove road at the north. Visitors should be prepared for the size of the area and the mountainous terrain surrounding the lake.

== See also ==
- List of lakes in California
- List of lakes in the San Francisco Bay Area
- William Kent (U.S. Congressman)
