= Fringe theories on the location of New Albion =

From 1577 to 1580 Sir Francis Drake circumnavigated the world. In 1579 as part of this voyage he landed on the west coast of North America which consequently has drawn the attention of scores of historians, geographers, linguists, anthropologists and other professionals. In addition, many history buffs have sought to locate Drake's New Albion. The established site for Drake's 1579 landing at New Albion is at Drake's Cove in Drakes Bay in Marin County, California (38.034°N 122.940°W). More than a score of ideas for an alternative to Drake's New Albion claim have been put forth which cover the coast from Alaska to Baja California Sur, Mexico. These ideas span the eighteenth through the early twenty-first centuries.

== Fringe theories in general ==
Fringe theories are concepts that markedly diverge from widely accepted scientific frameworks, often lacking sufficient empirical support or contradicting established knowledge. Financial journalist Alexander Davidson characterized fringe theories as "peddled by a small band of staunch supporters," but not necessarily without merit.

== Official recognitions of Drake's New Albion landing site ==
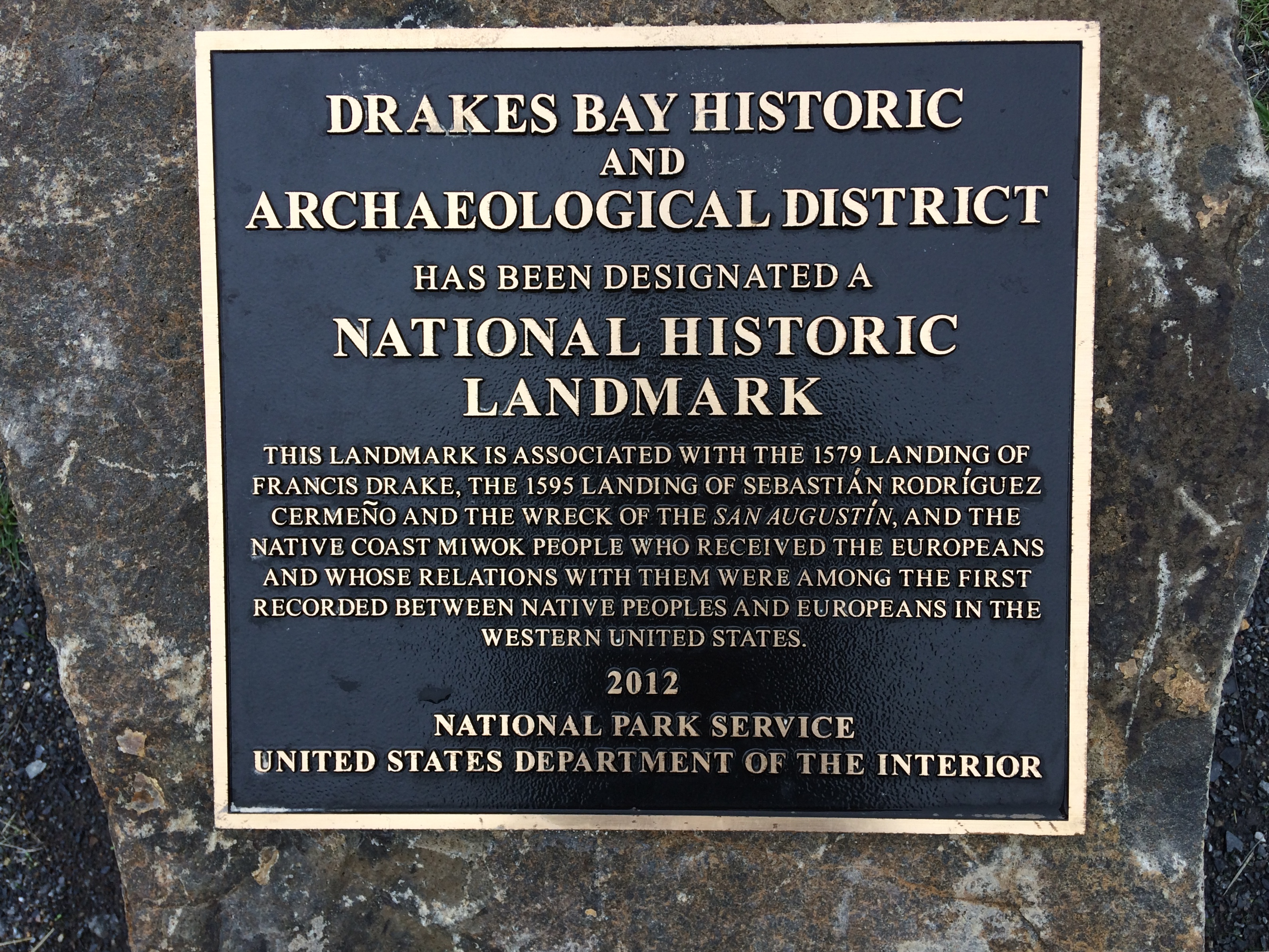
National Historic Landmark commemorating Sir Francis Drake, Sebastian Rodriguez Cermeño, and Coast Miwok people at Point Reyes, California

Several official agencies have commemorated the possible location of Francis Drake's landing in Marin County, California. 38.034°N 122.940°W The site of Drake's landing is still unknown, but thought to be the most likely site, as part of a National Historic Landmark by the U.S. Department of the Interior, the Drakes Bay Historic and Archeological District. As of October 2021, the State of California recognizes Drake's landing as a California Historical Landmark. That the Coast Miwok people's first contact with Europeans was with Sir Francis Drake is also recognised by both the Federated Indians of Graton Rancheria and the Coast Miwok Tribal Council of Marin, both organized under United States federal law. Both the Oregon State Parks and Oregon Historical Society support that Drake anchored at Cape Arago and proceeded to sail south to seek a suitable careenage site for Golden Hind.

== Other ideas ==
Over twenty locations have been proposed for the site where Drake careened the Golden Hind. Brian Kelleher compiled a list of over 140 opinions for the Drake landing site.

It has been suggested that Queen Elizabeth's desire to maintain secrecy of the locations and extent of Drake's north Pacific explorations led to suppression and obfuscation of the reports. Much confusion over the location may have resulted. Although the defeat of the Spanish Armada by Drake in 1588 may have alleviated the need for secrecy, the strategic quest for the Northwest Passage remained long after. Michael Turner's visits to Drake sites around the world have otherwise shown accurate records.

Following the coast from north to south, there are many suggested alternative locations.

== Alaska ==
There are several theories that place Drake's New Albion at various places along the Alaskan coast.

=== Devil's Cove ===
Donald and Charlene Viles proposed that Drake repaired his ship at Devil's Cove, Alaska.58.36°N 154.17°W

=== Prince William Sound ===
Laird Nelson proposed that Drake sailed as far north as Prince William Sound, Alaska 60°N 146.5°W based on the westward run of the land in the area. Laird believes Drake was at 58 degrees north and "may have been even further north." Drake then turned south to anchor at Birch Bay, Washington.

=== Stephens Passage ===
Samuel Bawlf maps Drake's voyage as far north as the Stephens Passage 53.233°N 133.759°W in the now state of Alaska. Bawlf proposes that Drake established New Albion at Comox Bay (see below) and careened the Golden Hinde at Whale Cove (see below).

== British Columbia ==
There are several theories that place Drake's New Albion at various places along the British Columibian coast.

=== Victoria, Vancouver Island, BC ===
In December, 2013, metal detector operator Bruce Campbell found an English coin made between 1551 and 1553 near Victoria, British Columbia. Campbell believes the coin is only the oldest thing he's likely to ever find, and Royal British Columbia Museum curator Grant Keddie does not believe the find can be connected to Drake. Loose finds such as coins have little value in establishing landing sites.

=== Comox Bay, Vancouver Island, BC ===
In 2003 Canadian R. Samuel Bawlf suggested that Drake's New Albion was Vancouver Island and that Drake erected a post containing such a proclamation at what is today Comox, British Columbia, located on Vancouver Island.49.66°N 124.95°W Bawlf supports the idea that Drake completed the "Neahkahnie Mountain Survey" and believes Drake careened the Golden Hind in Whale Cove, Oregon. He points to a number of pieces of evidence in support of his view that the official published record of Drake's voyage was deliberately altered to suppress the true extent of his discoveries. Bawlf also relies heavily upon the configuration of the coastline as depicted in some of the maps and globes of the era, including the so-called French and Dutch Drake Maps which depict his voyage as having reached a point northward of a chain of islands to the northwest of New Spain and other maps depicting New Albion at latitudes above those of northern California, such as Richard Hakluyt's 1587 map of the New World showing Nova Albion at 50 degrees north latitude. Bawlf also placed emphasis on the fact that, on an initial rendition of his globe in 1592, Emery Molyneux depicted the line of the coast of North America behind Vancouver Island with remarkable accuracy, although the islands themselves, depicted on the French and Dutch Drake maps, do not appear.

Although Bob Ward initially drew some of the discrepancies between the official published accounts of Drake's voyage and other documents to Bawlf's attention, and concluded that Drake likely sailed much farther to the north than northern California, he has been critical of some of Bawlf's conclusions, such as Drake's erecting a post proclaiming New Albion at what is now Comox Bay.

Bawlf's claims regarding "spectral analysis" and four matching islands have been disputed by Derek Hayes. Oliver Seeler disputes Bawlf's conclusions, as does Eric Powell.

Bawlf's work has also been criticized by Edward Von der Porten, who calculated that Bawlf's theory requires the Golden Hinde to have traveled "an average of 5.95 knots [...] in a ship capable of less than one knot in those conditions." Further, Bawlf fails to identify the white cliffs, the Islands of St. James or the Coast Miwok People. Von der Porten states that Bawlf "has no evidence for either the conspiracy or his 'ten degree rule.'"

Dr. John Sugden describes Bawlf's proposed route for Drake into Alaska and British Columbia, then concludes: "There is simply no evidence for this adventure, which even Bawlf admits is 'impossible' to reconcile with the records of the voyage."

=== Foul Bay, Vancouver Island, BC ===
In 2013, Bob Graham proposed that Drake landed at Foul Bay 48.4116°N 123.3287°W at the southern end of Vancouver Island. Foul Bay is within the City of Victoria, at the city's southeast corner.

=== Boundary Bay, BC ===
About 1995, Will Paulik, a local historian and environmentalist, suggested Drake landed at Boundary Bay 49.0795°N 122.8595°W Northeast of Point Roberts, Washington and to the east of Vancouver Island.

== Washington ==
There are several theories that place Drake's New Albion at various places along the Washington coast.

=== Birch Bay, Washington ===
Fisherman Laird Nelson has proposed that Drake left Guatulco, Mexico, headed west 2,100 miles, then magnetic north for 2,700 miles with three ships: the un-renamed Pelican; the Los Reyes, a captured Spanish vessel; and a pinnace. From that point, the ships travelled an additional 550 miles north to Prince William Sound and back along the coast. The ships then travelled 700 miles south through the Inside Passage to the first of three landing sites: Birch Bay. 48.92°N 122.78°W Here, on the third day, the Pelican sank.

Nelson does not explain how Drake could have covered 5,350 miles west and north when The World Encompassed establishes the distance traveled as 1,400 English 16th-Century leagues which is only 4,000 miles. (Laird's distance of 4,800 miles for the west and first portion north is equivalent to 1,400 modern leagues.) Laird's proposal has Drake traveling the entire distance and dangerous Inside Passage at surprising speed, covering the 6,600 miles in 62 days.

=== Lummi Bay, Washington ===
Nelson proposed that after the loss of his flagship, Drake explored in a small boat for five days and then moved the Los Reyes to a second port at Lummi Bay, Washington.48.77°N 122.67°W . Here Drake careened the Los Reyes.

=== Sandy Point, Washington ===
Nelson puts Drake's second anchorage at Sandy Point, Washington, a part of Lummi Bay, where Drake reportedly spent the second week of his New Albion visit.48.73°N 122.54°W At Post Point, within Bellingham Bay, Drake created his "monument", rock carvings in the cliff face of King Henry VIII and his sixth wife Katherine Parr. Initials attributed to the carver, Richard Cadwell were inscribed. The 3 ton rock carvings have been knocked down, but still there in 2000. The Plate of Brasse refers to the "thick coat of bottom paint" the carver put over the carvings.

=== Strait of Juan de Fuca ===
Robert Ward proposes that Drake ventured as far north as the Strait of Juan de Fuca, 48.478°N 124.688°W but traveled south to Whale Cove (see below) to careen the Golden Hinde and establish New Albion.

The Strait of Juan de Fuca is the only practical access to Comox Bay, given the difficult waters and warlike tribes of the Johnstone Strait.

== Oregon ==
There are several theories that place Drake's New Albion at various places along the Oregon coast.

=== Nehalem Bay, Tillamook County, Oregon ===
In 1971, Don Viles and Wayne Jensen published the idea that Drake landed at Nehalem Bay.45.686430°N 123.932860°W

Garry Gitzen has continued to support this idea. Gitzen claims the "Neahkahnie Mountain Survey," the Hondius Map, the Edward Wright World Chart of 1599, the Nehalem Indians and the Three Arch Rocks prove Drake's landing site was in Nehalem Bay, Oregon as well as the Indian culture of the Pacific Northwest.

Gitzen argues that the "Survey" is a formal survey by Robert Schultz A.S.C.E and Phillip Costaggini's 1981 Oregon State thesis "Survey of Artifacts at Neahkahnie Mountain Oregon (1976-1981)" of the coastal area two to four miles north of Nehalem Bay encompassing the area up to one mile over the countryside of Neahkahnie Mountain. The incised rocks and carins are explained as recordings of a land survey and latitude showing angles and bearings in "The Treasure Rocks of Neah-kah-nie Mountain" (2012)., the "W" rock which has components that "represent a combination of sun and star sighting points to determine the longitude, date and time and day," and the "Rays Rock" which "is a compass rose point used to measure points on Neahkahnie Mountain and beyond."

Gitzen claims the outline and topography of Nehalem Bay match the Hondius Map, and that the Islands of Saint James are the Three Arch Rocks 13 miles south of the entrance to Nehalem Bay.

An article "Edward Wright's World Chart 1599 published in the blind peer-review "Terrae Incognitae" journal of the Society for the Histories of Discoveries contains Queen Elizabeth's Privy Seal. The only such map of the 16th century to carry the Queen's seal. The map was originally published in 1599 by Richard Hakluyt and reissued by the Hakluyt Society's 2 volume publication "The Hakluyt Handbook"(1974) where it is identified by David Beers Quinn, editor, and Helen Wallis, Map Curator of the British Museum, both agree the map is the most authentic map Hakluyt published in his books.

Gitzen presented a case for Nehalem Bay as a more northern landing site in front of the San Francisco Yacht Club as recently as December 2024.

=== Whale Cove, Lincoln County, Oregon ===
Zelia Nuttall was first to challenge (1917) the prevailing theory of a California landing in spite of much adversity. Drake would have sailed and careened further North into the Pacific Northwest before heading out on the circumnavigation. So the expedition sealing activities reported after leaving the Drakes Bay careening site would not have occurred by the Farallon Islands but by the islands off Cape Blanco after sighting Cape Arago and leaving the Whale Cove careening site.

In 1978 British amateur historian Bob Ward, after making a study of the geography of the Pacific coast of the U.S. and Canada, and a single visit to the site, suggested that Drake actually landed much farther north, in Whale Cove in present-day Oregon.44.788944°N 124.070689°W Advocates of the Whale Cove theory argue that when Captain James Cook first sighted the American coast at Cape Foulweather two centuries later, he described it in his log, with unknowing accuracy, as "the long-looked for coast of New Albion." Whale Cove lies just north of Cape Foulweather. Advocates of the Whale Cove theory dismiss the latitude given by Drake on the grounds that he may have deliberately falsified it in order to deceive the rival Spanish. Although the official account of Drake's voyage gives the anchorage location as 38 degrees, the only two known hand-written accounts of the voyage, preserved in the British Library, say that it was at 44 degrees, which is on the mid-Oregon coast. Drake and Queen Elizabeth, they argue, falsified the location because he mistakenly thought he had discovered the North West Passage when he found, and sailed into, the Strait of Juan de Fuca, which today separates Vancouver Island, British Columbia from the mainland Olympic Peninsula of Washington state. In 2012, Ward established a website supporting Whale Cove.

Melissa Darby has established the Drake Anchorage Research Collaboration (DARC) in support of the possible Whale Cove landing site, although she says she "can not say for sure where he (Drake) was."

Whale Cove is the site identified by Bawlf as Drake's careening location. Ward, Bawlf and Darby do not agree on the general route taken by Drake, but all have Drake's careening site at Whale Cove.

Whale Cove remains an unnavigable bay in a dangerous part of the Oregon coast: mariners are advised to stay at least 600 yards offshore for the distance one mile north of Whale Cove to one mile south of Whale Cove. Whale Cove is not considered a usable bay by any size of vessel.

=== Oregon Dunes, Coos County, Oregon ===
The Drake Navigators Guild studied the landfall site for Drake - the place where he found land after his northwest, then east sailing - and determined that the site was Oregon Dunes.43.597°N 124.202°W This site had the same mysterious "snow" even though the temperatures were well above freezing as were observed by Captain George Vancouver in 1792.

=== South Cove, Oregon ===
The accepted site of the "bad bay" described by Drake is South Cove, Oregon. It is here that Drake anchored, but was unable to land or repair his ship.43.298°N 124.397°W The site was recognized as an Oregon landmark by the Oregon Historical Society and Oregon State Parks in 1977: it also recognizes that Drake later spent five weeks in California.43.304291°N 124.399177°W

=== Port Orford, Coos County, Oregon ===
Brereton reported that local citizens had suggested that Drake had landed at Port Orford, Oregon.42.741°N 124.496°W

=== Chetco River, Curry County, Oregon ===
Brereton reported that local citizens had suggested that Drake had landed at the Chetco River in Oregon.42.045°N 124.271°W

== California ==
There are several theories that place Drake's New Albion at various places along the California coast.

=== Trinidad Bay, Humboldt County, California ===
In 1926, Henry Wagner wrote about Drake's circumnavigation. Determining that Drake would have stopped at the first suitable location, Wagner concluded that Drake spent most of his time at Trinidad Bay.41.057°N 124.144°W

=== Albion, Mendocino County, California ===
In 1989, Rex Whipple proposed that Drake landed at Albion Cove, Albion, California.39.228947°N 123.771823°W After "ten years of research," Whipple announced his conclusions.

=== Bodega Bay, Sonoma County, California ===
Several ideas that Drake entered Bodega Bay have been put forth. Two specified actual landing sites.

In the 19th century, a number of observers argued that Bodega Bay was the site of Drake's New Albion. One of the most prominent of these was Alexander von Humboldt, who, however, had never been in California."

In 1894, Edward Berthould wrote in National Geographic that the geography of Bodega Head and its proximity to the Farallon Islands seem to point to Bodega Bay as Drake's landing site.

Bob Graham has evaluated the reported latitudes and the technologies available to Drake. If the 38-1/2 degree value is more accurate than the 38 degree value, and if Drake took a scientific series of experimental data and averaged it (for which there is no evidence), then the Bodega Bay latitude is more likely to be right than the Drakes Bay latitude. In comparison to other reported Drake latitudes across the globe, the reported latitudes establish that Drake's harbor was within 1/2 degree of 38 degrees north latitude or 38-1/2 degrees north latitude based on average errors.

==== Campbell Cove, Bodega Bay, Sonoma County, California ====
Brian T. Kelleher established a website which concludes that Drake careened at Bodega, California.37.407°N 122.107°W –

==== Inner Bodega Bay, Sonoma County, California ====
John W. Dwinelle suggested Drake careened his ship in the northern center of Bodega Bay. The white cliffs were assumed to be sand dunes. The natural harbor lacks sufficient depth for the Golden Hind.

=== Tomales Bay, Marin County, California ===
==== Sand Point ====
Just inside the entrance to Tomales Bay, behind Sand Point 38.2317°N 122.967°W is a location which has been suggested as Drake's landing site.

==== Tom's Point ====
Historian Robert Becker found a location to which the Hondius Broadside map could apply at Tom's Point on the east side of Tomales Bay.38.171°N 122.913°W

=== Drakes Bay, Marin County, California ===
One of San Francisco's earliest historians, Frank Soule, wrote in support of a Drakes Bay landing site. George Davidson concluded that Drake was at Drakes Bay, but believed the actual careening point was just inside Point Reyes Head. 37.994°N 122.974°W Davidson's work was based on sailing the coast. The identification of the careening point required exploring the site the way the artist of the Hondius Broadside inset viewed the site.

=== Bolinas Bay, Marin County, California ===
Two Bolinas Bay locations have been proposed:

==== Agate Beach ====
George Epperson believed Drake stayed at Agate Beach 37.9°N 122.713°W at Bolinas Bay in Marin County, California. Epperson collected many objects from the area, but none could be linked to Drake.

==== Bolinas Lagoon ====
In 1974, Aubrey Neasham and William Pritchard wrote in support of Bolinas Lagoon 37.906°N 122.682°W as Drake's landing site.

=== San Francisco Bay, generally ===
Several early claims put Drake in San Francisco Bay, but did not establish where in the Bay Drake visited and then careened the Golden Hind. These include Robert Greenhow in 1845, Jules Verne in 1879 and Samuel Johnson.

Laurence Bergreen believes Drake entered San Francisco Bay, but fails to address any details of the navigation, landing, or site or to explain Drake's apparent failure to explore the extensive inland waterway as the possible Strait of Anian.

Modern San Francisco Bay landing ideas share several important clues with the accepted Drakes Bay site: meeting with the Coast Miwok people, latitude close to 38°north and proximity to the Farallon Islands.

These landing ideas also claim that after sailing 400 miles down the Oregon and California coasts unsuccessfully seeking a harbor, Drake saw Drakes Bay and the white cliffs in the excellent bay, but continued past the harbor.

The new ideas suggest birds above the inland from Drakes Bay suggested the harbor of San Francisco Bay or that the Spanish had earlier surveyed San Francisco Bay and that Drake had those maps.

The new ideas ignore the difficulty of finding the Bay from the sea including the fog and islands which make the entrance to the Golden Gate nearly invisible.

The entrance to San Francisco Bay is dangerous and none of the accounts discuss the shoals and difficulties of entering the Bay, especially on an unknown basis.

The accounts indicate that there was a single anchorage within the harbor, not the scores of possible sites for a mariner within San Francisco Bay.

Except for the entrance to the Bay, the San Francisco Bay shoreline is warm or even hot on summer days, far different from the continuous cold and fog reported by Drake.

Late in the five-week stay, Drake took a trip up and into the interior of the country which was found to be far different. This corresponds to a coastal site, not a site within San Francisco Bay.

Had Drake entered San Francisco Bay, he would have spent weeks exploring up the Sacramento and San Joaquin Rivers in the belief that the Strait of Anian had, indeed been found. He would have reported one of the world's most important bays. Neither of these occurred.

All of the specific proposed landing sites, below, within San Francisco Bay are north of the Golden Gate. Holmes reports that if Drake had entered San Francisco Bay, the summer winds would have forced Drake to find a harbor south of the Golden Gate. John Lenz presented a case for San Francisco Bay as a Drake landing site as recently as December 2021.

==== Strawberry Cove, Marin County, California ====
Duane Van Dieman developed a notion that Drake entered San Francisco Bay and careened the Golden Hinde at Strawberry Cove. 37.888°N 122.511°W Van Dieman relies on the Hondius Broadside insert being a formal overhead map which does not correspond with the conventions of the 16th century or the other Hondius inserts. Van Dieman ignores the other problems with all San Francisco Bay claims including the multiple harbors, the lack of continuous fog, the difficulty of finding San Francisco Bay from the sea and the dangers of entering San Francisco Bay on an unknown basis.

==== Larkspur, Marin County, California ====
Robert Stupack believes Drake established New Albion at Portsmouth Cove 37.967°N 122.495°W and then careened the Golden Hinde at Larkspur. 37.943°N 122.504°W Stupack believes "Drake's Treasure" was cached in the area and has done extensive excavations. 525,000 pounds of material have been removed from the site. 37.9495°N 122.5142°W In 2017, Stupack claimed, "There are 7,347,000,000 people on this planet who would like to find a buried treasure on their property. IT HAPPENED TO ME." Stupak presented a case for San Francisco Bay as a landing site on the Procrastination Station podcast as recently as July 2025.

==== Point San Quentin, Marin County, California ====
Robert H. Power (1926–1991), co-owner of the Nut Tree in Vacaville, CA, promoted the idea that Drake's New Albion was inside San Francisco Bay near Point San Quentin.37.939400°N 122.486700°W Among his arguments was that the Hondius Broadside map matched a part of the topography when parts were adjusted using a 2:1 correction. Among the problems with Power's idea is the difficulty of sailors finding San Francisco Bay from the ocean (it was first discovered by land and the first sea attempts to then locate the Bay failed), the lack of continuous foggy weather, the multitudes of good harbors, and the extreme dangers of entering such a bay on an unknown basis.

To support his idea, Power formed an organization called Nova Albion Explorations which supported investigative work including archaeology of San Francisco Bay Shellmounds. The excavations "did not reveal any historic material which would lead anyone to believe the site experienced any contact with Caucasian parties of the 16th century."

A. Bray Dickinson supported an upper San Francisco Bay site in 1954.

Walter Starr and Francis Farquhar supported the San Quentin site.

==== Olompali, Petaluma River, Marin County, California ====
Robert C. Thomas advocates that Drake landed at Olompali, on the Petaluma River, inside San Francisco Bay. "Under the shelter of cliffs" at Drakes Bay, Thomas believes Drake's men saw seagulls that rode east on updrafts, so that the men "could see that the land over which they (the birds) were flying was really a peninsula (a Marin County peninsula formed by the Pacific coast and San Francisco Bay.)" "The home-bound gulls swept inland" to Olomp-ali. Thomas dismisses the likelihood that Drake stayed at Drakes Bay, but instead headed south.

Thomas believes that while "there appeared to be no break in the shoreline" showing San Francisco Bay, Drake ran into a "strong current." Risking "imminent danger," Drake "was committed to an uncontrollable approach" and then "miraculously...found that they had passed through..." the Golden Gate.

According to Thomas, over the next five days, Drake explored the 21 nautical miles in the northwest portion of San Francisco Bay, ignored numerous promising harbors, and moved "his ship on June 21" to Chok-olom, the port near Olomp-ali.38.119°N 122.515°W

Thomas glosses over the fact that the Marin "peninsula" is not visible or discernible from the coast. Thomas does not solve the problems with any proposed San Francisco Bay Drake landing site: the difficulty of sailors finding San Francisco Bay from the ocean (it was first discovered by land and the first sea attempts to then locate the Bay failed), the lack of continuous foggy weather, the multitudes of good harbors, and the extreme dangers of entering such a bay on an unknown basis. Thomas also proposes that Drake sailed inland a significant distance quickly without it being noted in any of the accounts

==== Grizzly Bay, Suisun Bay, Solano County, California ====
Allen Schuh suggested that Drake landed at Grizzly Bay38.130°N 122.033°W in Suisun Bay, Solano County, California.

==== Rio Vista, Solano County, California ====
Mrs. Duncan S. Robinson wrote that "Drake probably explored this region on his trip up the Sacramento River in 1578"38.157°N 121.687°W

=== Half Moon Bay, San Mateo County, California ===
Alan Brown posed the question, "Did Drake Land Here" in 1960.37.5°N 122.49°W Frank M. Stanger proposed that Drake landed at Pillar Point.

=== Point Año Nuevo Cove, San Mateo County, California ===
Louise Welshons Buell, Harry Morrison, Richard Scott and Gerald Webber suggested that Drake landed at Point Año Nuevo Cove.37.116°N 122.312°W

=== Monterey Bay, Monterey County, California ===
Around 1934, a bottle found with a thin, rolled lead plate was found at Monterey Bay, California. Myron Oliver and Ed Kennedy believed this proved Drake at been at that location.36.603°N 121.88°W

=== Carmel River, Monterey County, California ===
In 1718, mission friar Juan Amando Niel, speculated that Drake had entered the Carmel River.36.536°N 121.929°W

=== Pirate's Cove, San Luis Obispo Bay, San Luis Obispo County, California ===
Margie Mallagh reported a local legend regarding Drake landing in San Luis Obispo Bay at a site known as Mallagh's Landing 35.1740°N 120.7165°W or Pirate's Cove.35.175°N 120.715°W Robert Pate, Richard Dobson and Ethyl Sagen pursued this work.

=== Goleta, Santa Barbara County, California ===
Justin M. Ruhge reported that he believed Drake landed at Goleta, California. 34.412°N 119.839°W Jim Gilmore believes that cannon found in the area came from Drake.

== Mexico ==
There are several theories that place Drake's New Albion at various places along the Mexican coast.

=== Cedros Island, Baja California Norte, Mexico ===
Harry Kelsey speculates that Drake did not head out to sea on a northerly course. Instead, Kelsey speculates that Drake coasted north to the known Spanish areas near the Baja California Sur and Baja California Norte border coastal area. Three possible sites are identified without any detailed analysis and no specific harbors are found. Cedros Island is the northernmost of these ideas.28.19°N 115.21°W

=== San Benito Islands, Baja California Norte, Mexico ===
The San Benito Islands is the middle of the Kelsey ideas.28.304°N 115.59°W

=== Magdalena Bay, Baja California Sur, Mexico ===
Magdalena Bay is the southernmost of the Kelsey ideas.25.418°N 111.99°W
