= Drake in California =

In 1579, Francis Drake was halfway during his circumnavigation and sailed out in the Pacific, then turned east seeking the Strait of Anián (a water passage from the Pacific to the Atlantic, known in the reverse direction as the Northwest Passage), or for a place to repair his ships.

After reaching land in Oregon, at the Oregon Dunes, near Coos Bay, Drake headed south, seeking a safe harbor.

== Landing in California ==
Drake's ship The Golden Hind landed in a coastal harbor, which Drake named New Albion, after nearby white cliffs which reminded him of England's White Cliffs of Dover. His crew unloaded the ship and careened it on a beach, where they built a stone fort and spent five weeks repairing their ship.

Like most early explorations, mainly by Spaniards, Drake's harbor was not marked by a large, permanent marker that could be found by future visitors. Instead, smaller pieces of physical and documentary evidence lead to the identity of Drake's landing site. Scholars find uncertainty over Drake's landing site "a little strange since most of the voyage and layovers are described in such satisfying detail by Francis Fletcher." Historian Derek Wilson states the evidence points to either Drake’s Bay (38.0138° latitude) or Bodega Bay (38.3332°) near Point Reyes, California. The pieces of evidence include:

=== Eleven keys ===
1. The bay is within one-half degree (thirty nautical miles) of 38 degrees or 38 degrees, 30 minutes north latitude.

2. The bay is in Coast Miwok territory.

3. Islands of Saint James are not far without the bay.

4. There is no strait leading into the continent, nor currents at sea suggesting one.

5. White banks and cliffs resemble counterparts along the English Channel.

6. The climate was cold, very foggy and windy from 27 June through 2 August (new style dates).

7. The bay is the second in a charted sequence of two bays when traveling south.

8. Drake found the bay unexpectedly, as by godsend and "fell with" a harbor within the bay.

9. The bay faces south, with depths from six to eight fathoms within a prominent point, diminishing gradually to three fathoms on a course leading northeasterly into the bay toward an anchorage off a river or estuary in the north end.

10. A fertile and hospitable inland region contrasts sharply with the barren, cold and foggy haven at the shore.

11. Artifacts attributable to the Drake expedition are in Native- American village sites.

Drake's Cove in Drakes Bay fits these criteria.

=== The three most important keys ===
Robert Allen recognizes three of these items as the keys that identify the location of Drake's landing site:

1. "A latitude of 38 degrees was given six times in contemporary accounts as the latitude where Drake came ashore."

2. "Not farre without this harborough did lye certain lands (we called them the Islands of Saint James)" The only islands in the vicinity of 38 degrees north latitude are the Farallon Islands. They are visible only as far north as Point Reyes.

Upon leaving his landing site, Drake was reported "from thence setting his course southwest."

Working backwards, from the Farallon Islands, heading northeast, takes one directly into Drakes Bay.

3. "White bancks and cliffes, which lie toward the sea" are prominent features of Drakes Bay. The cliffs face both south and west, "toward the sea." These are similar to the white cliffs of Dover along the English Channel, hence the name "Nova Albion."

=== Additional keys ===
Raymond Aker recognizes ten specific additional keys beyond the eleven, above:

12. Agreement with the Dudley Charts

13. A Fair and Good Bay

14. Indian Houses Close by the Waterside

15. No Choice of Havens

16. Flora and Fauna

17. Agreement with the Hondius Portus Novae Albionis Inset

18. Indian Village Three Quarters of a Mile from Encampment

19. Hills in Relation to Encampment

20. The Nature of the Fort

21. Relation of the Montanus Engraving.

=== Additional keys ===
22. Further exploration of the area was a hike inland.

23. The area is suitable to the requirements of careening and ship repair.

24. There is abundant supply of stone for the fort's "bulwarks".

25. The site is in the area of the first finding of the Plate of Brass.

26. The area abounds in foods of the types mentioned in the contemporary accounts and offers an adequate supply of water and food.

27. The cove area is sufficiently extensive to accommodate the expedition.

29. The water visibility enabled the Indians, when they "chanced to see a fish so see a fish so neare the shoare that they might reach the place without swimming, they would never or very seldom miss to take it."

== Legacy ==
- Many things in Marin County, California are named after Sir Francis Drake. These include Sir Francis Drake Boulevard, Drakes Bay, Drakes Estero, and Drakes Beach.
- Poet and playwright George Sterling wrote a poem about Drake's visit, "The Homing of Drake." The poem was first published in Sunset Magazine, v. 16, n. 3 (February 1906), p. 366. It was reprinted in Sterling's book A Wine of Wizardry and Other Poems (San Francisco: A. M. Robertson, 1909 [stated publication date, but actually published in 1908]), pp. 42-43.

== See also ==
- Fringe theories on the location of New Albion
- Drake's Plate of Brass, a forgery of a plate purported to have been posted by Drake in California
- New Albion
- Drake Navigators Guild
