= Timeline of Francis Drake's circumnavigation =

Historical event

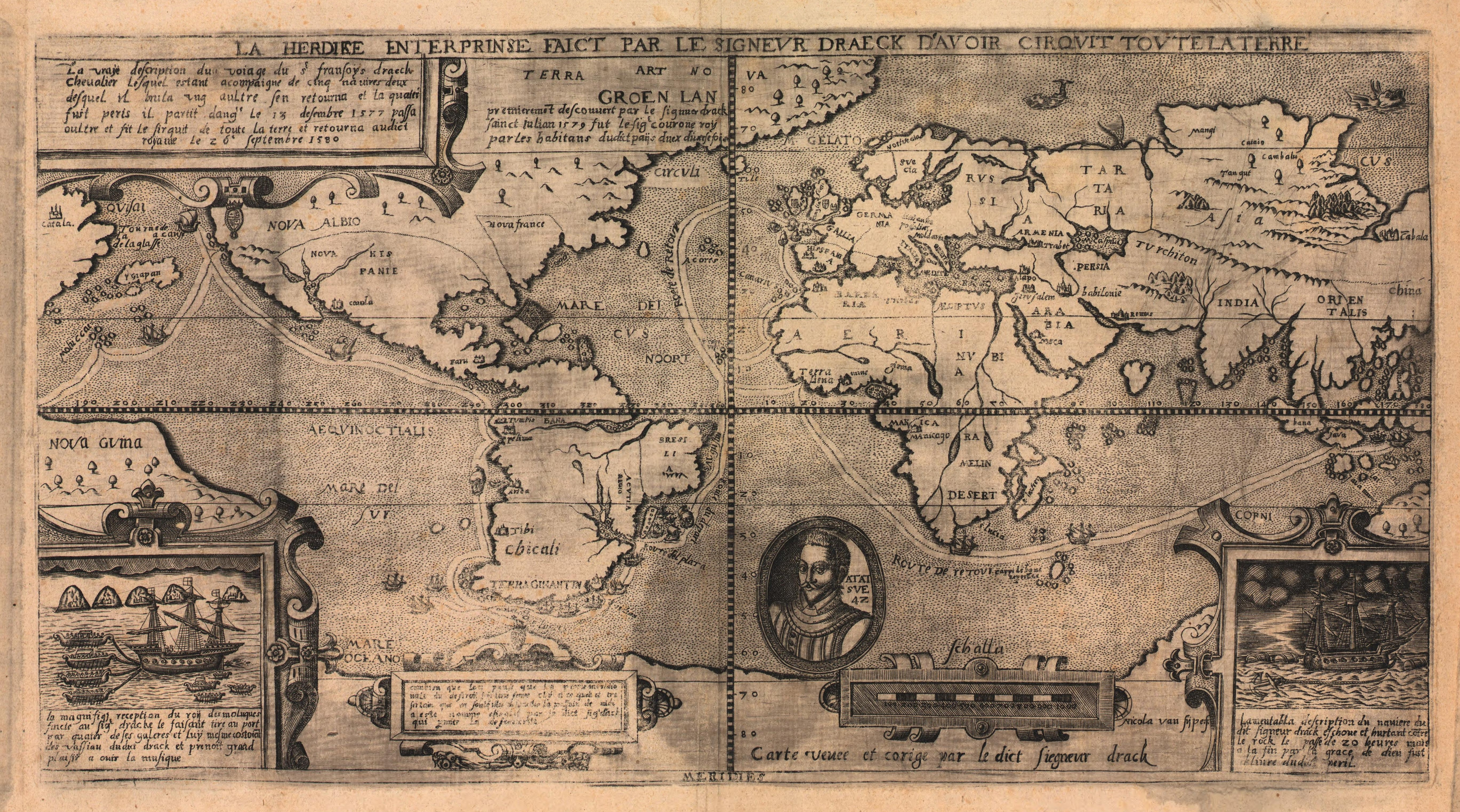
Map of Franics Drake's circumnavigation by Nicola van Sype

On 15 November 1577, Francis Drake began a circumnavigation which would last for 1046 days. Before this journey, only a single expedition had completed a circumnavigation, one pioneered by Ferdinand Magellan. On Drake's voyage, Drake was the first Englishman to navigate out of the south Atlantic Ocean and during the journey, he established the first overseas possession claims executed during the reign of Queen Elizabeth I. At its completion, this was the longest voyage humans had made to date.

Ideas of this journey arose amidst cold war tensions between Spain and England. During this time, Drake formed the idea to plunder Spanish ships in the Pacific Ocean and John Dee developed a formal proposal for English circumnavigation. After Dee submitted his proposal to Elizabeth's Privy Council, Elizabeth and Drake met at her Greenwich palace in 1577 where they finalized written details of such a voyage. In the plan, Elizabeth directed Drake to pass through the Strait of Magellan and sail north, up the coast of Chile, to 30° south latitude. There was also the unwritten understanding, one too dangerous to record on paper, that Drake was to raid Spanish property. He was to return home by the same route. During the ensuing circumnavigation, an uncertain number of English sailors were lost at the cost of zero Spanish lives.

From Plymouth Sound, England, Drake navigated into the Atlantic and then the Pacific, successfully plundered Spanish ships and settlements, and eventually departed from the original plan when he continued north of 30° south latitude to what is now Guatulco, Mexico. Due to treacherous sailing conditions in and around the Strait of Magellan and the possibility that Spaniards would be searching for him along the coast of South America, Drake abandoned the notion of returning to England by reversing his route. Instead, he sailed northward since he believed the quickest way home could be through the hypothetical Strait of Anian. Failing to find the supposed waterway, Drake eventually circumnavigated home. The expedition returned to England in September 1580 with one ship, Golden Hinde, which was laden with treasure. The fleet's chaplain, Francis Fletcher, and impressed pilot, Nuno da Silva, both kept logs of the journey. Drake's log was lost in the Whitehall Palace fire of 1698.

Drake's successful circumnavigation led to him being held with high regard as a sailor and explorer by his contemporaries and he became famous throughout Europe. The value of the treasure deposited in the Tower of London, £264,000, eclipsed the revenue collected by the English Parliament each year. Drake's feat resulted in his knighthood, attempts to the strengthen Spanish defenses, and along with the defeat of the Spanish Armada in 1588, upset the geopolitical balance of power.

== 1577 ==
| Date | Location | Details | Ref(s) |
| 25 November [O.S. 15 November] 1577 | Plymouth Sound, England | In what would prove to be a false start, Drake's five ship fleet sails from the sound at five o'clock in the afternoon. The ships are Pelican (150 tons/18 guns), commanded by Dake; Elizabeth (80 tons/16 guns), commanded by John Wynter; Marigold (30 tons/16 guns), commanded by John Thomas; Swan (50 tons/5 guns), commanded by John Chester; and Benedict (15 tons/1 gun), commanded by Tom Moone. Drake's brother, Thomas Drake, and cousin, John Drake, are among the crew. The ships hold four pinnaces which await final assembly should they be needed. The crews, who total 164 men and boys, include common sailors, artisans, and gentlemen. The expedition is supplied with a chaplain, Francis Fletcher, who records the most complete surviving account of any who serve on this journey. The crew believes they are on a voyage to Alexandria, Egypt. The mix of social classes will eventually lead to problematic tensions. | |
| 16 November – 27 November O.S. (all following dates O.S.) | Falmouth, England | A gale forces the fleet to seek safe harbor here. Even so, Marigold and Pelican lose masts within the harbor. | |
| 28 November – 13 December | Plymouth Sound, England | The fleet returns to the journey's starting point and effects repairs. Amidst embarrassment and castigation in the awkward situation, Drake dismisses James Sydae for unsatisfactorily provisioning the ships for the voyage. The dismissal leads to spoken displeasure from Thomas Doughty, to carpenter Edward "Ned" Bright, about Drake's command. Additionally, Doughty makes other private comments describing his influence and authority in terms as equal to that of Drake's. Drake sails from Plymouth to the coast of north-west Africa. | |
| 25–31 December | Mogador Island, Morocco | Running south-westerly with favourable winds along the Moroccan coast, the crew realises they are not bound for Alexandria. Although some discontent was later recorded, no resentment is chronicled in expedition narratives at the time. A mile off the mainland and north-northwest of the island, Drake's crew casts anchor for the first time since leaving England. Here they assemble a pinnace. On the island, crewman John Fry is kidnapped. Drake organizes efforts to locate and rescue Fry but they are unsuccessful. Fry is released after the expedition sails and eventually finds passage home on an English merchant ship. | |

== 1578 ==
| Date | Location | Details | Ref(s) |
| 17 January [O.S. 7 January] 1578 | Cape de Guerre, Morocco | After progress is impeded by contrary winds and weather, the fleet follows the African coast to de Guere which is only 53 nautical miles south of Mogador. They encounter three canters, a type of Spanish fishing boat. The English sailors use the recently assembled pinnace to seize the boats which are forced to join the fleet. | |
| 13 January O.S. (all following dates are O.S.) | Rio del Oro, Morocco | Here, in what is currently southern Morocco and just under the Tropic of Cancer, Drake releases the three canters. Using the pinnace, they take a caravel. | |
| 15 January | Cape Barbas, Morocco | Under the high cliffs of this cape, Marigold seizes another caravel. | |
| 16–21 January | Cape Blanc, Mauritania | Here, the fleet takes a Spanish ship which was riding at anchor, her crew having fled. With her, they enter the harbor, anchor, and land. The crew cleans their ships and has friendly interactions with the local people. The local people offer to sell Drake a woman, a transaction he declines. Several locals, who are in need, try to trade for water. Drake refuses to trade; instead he simply gives them what they desire. The Englishmen release all the captured ships except one for which they exchange the diminutive Benedict. Her name is recorded as Christopher. After six days, the expedition sets sail for the Cape Verde Islands. | |
| 28–30 January | Maio, Cape Verde | The fleet anchors on the western part of Maio, facing the nearby island of Santiago. Local inhabitants salt the wells and flee which forces Drake to send Wynter and Doughty, with of a detachment of 60 men under them, inland to procure food and water. A Portuguese pilot who had been impressed at Cape Blanc guides the men to the island's main settlement. | |
| 31 January – 2 February | Santiago, Cape Verde | Drake anchors on the east shore of Santiago Island and lands. Following a set tradition of armed conflict between Portuguese and English seamen in these waters, Drake captures a ship, Santa Maria despite coastal shore fire from the Portuguese-claimed island, Maio. Santa Maria yields useful supplies, and Drake impresses Portuguese pilot Nuño da Silva with whom also comes invaluable charts. Wynter later distances himself from these actions as he fears a piracy charge. Drake renames the ship Mary and places Thomas Doughty in command. Drake sails west, into the Atlantic, with Nuño da Silva aboard. The impressed pilot will remain with the expedition for over a year. Upon leaving Cape Verde, Fletcher wrote in anticipation of the journey ahead: "And so we take our farwell from the antient knowne parts of the world or earth, to travill into the new discovered partes of the world, by the Gracious Providence of God, the God of all the world, Who, hitherto, in His singular mercy and grace, has preserved us alive to see and behold more and more of his excellent workes, and to declare his power." After departing Cape Verde—while sailing west in the Atlantic—a problem unfolds. Accounts differ as to the nature of trouble, but they agree that Drake intervenes when Doughty quarreled with sailors under his command. Drake relieves Doughty and takes command of Mary. | |
| End of February | Fernando de Noronha, Brazil | This marks the completion of the expedition's trans-Atlantic journey. In da Silva's log—which is the only mention of this location in period records—the pilot records the date of arriving at the Brazilian island as "at the end of the month." With his charts, da Silva can be confident of the fleet's exact location. | |
| 10 March | Todos os Santos, Brazil | The fleet approaches a Portuguese settlement, Salvador, on the coast of Brazil. Da Silva cautions against entering the bay to seek food and water due to the presence of galleys. Wishing to avoid conflict and alerting authorities to English interlopers, Drake heeds the warning and continues to sail south along the coast of Brazil. Da Silva is the lone person to record this landfall. | |
| 5 April | 31 ½° and 33 ½° south latitude off the Brazilian coast | At 31 ½°, Wynter records that the fleet fell with the coast of Brazil on this day. He observes that the land is flat with higher elevations within the country. Fletcher assigns 33 ½° south latitude as the fleet's first landfall and also records it on this day. He describes the land in positive terms saying that it appeared to be a fair opportunity to perform much needed maintenance on the ship's hulls. He writes that a deadly fog prevents them from availing this location for those purposes. | |
| 6 April | South of 33 ½° south latitude off the Brazilian coast | In this region, the fleet encounters a violent storm. It is so strong that Christopher is lost and prevents any landing along the Brazilian coast. | |
| 14 April–8 May | Rio de la Plata at the border of Argentina and Uruguay | Here, a mountainous outcrop amidst a generally undistinguished coast alerts Drake that fresh water is likely to found nearby. The fleet anchors near Cape Joy in Rio de la Plata which today forms the border separating Argentina and Uruguay. Even though this body of water is identified as a rio, or river, in the name, it is best understood as a bay or estuary. This is the fleet's first anchorage after having crossed the Atlantic. The sailors re-provision by hunting for meat, taking on water, and gathering wood under pleasant conditions. Here, Christopher rejoins the fleet after she had been lost from the fleet during turbulent weather encountered while sailing south along the Brazilian coast. Drake gives the cheerful name to the cape as recognition of this reunion. The fleet anchors at various points within the bay here: Isla de Flores, Arazati, and Cape San Antonio. | |
| 8 May | South of Rio de la Plata in the Atlantic along Argentina's coast | The expedition sails south, and Swan is quickly separated from the fleet. Later, on 8 May, a storm cuts Mary from the fleet. Among the Mary's crew is Drake's brother Thomas and da Silva. | |
| 12–15 May | Cape Blanco and Banco Bryon (named Cape Hope by Drake), Argentina | Drake comes upon Banco Bryon, and anchors along the bank's seaward edge where he is temporarily reunited with Swan. Drake names nearby land Cape Hope while anchored well off the shore from the rocky bay. As he takes a boat into the bay with other crew to sound for depth, a thick, misty storm overtakes and threatens the men. They are saved when Captain Thomas sails Marigold and rescues them. Threatened further when the ships drag their anchors, the fleet heads for open water. The next day is calm so Drake goes ashore to light fires to signal the scattered fleet to return. Except for Mary, they safely do. The crew has congenial interactions with the indigenous inhabitants. With the land lacking resources such as water and wood, the fleet left the harbor on 15 May. They sail with a minimal spread of canvas hoping this will allow Mary to overtake them. | |
| May 17–3 June | Nodales Bay (named Seal Bay by Drake and known to the Spaniards as Baya de Lobos), Argentina | Fletcher writes that the fleet came to this bay at 47° 30′. Raymond Aker's nautical analysis and Michael Turner's field study place the bay 28 miles south of Fletcher's reckoning. They identify this location as Nodales Bay in Argentina. After anchoring at Seal Bay on May 17, the fleet moves deeper into the harbor in May 18 where they remain for the duration of their stay. During the stay here, the crew hauls ashore Swan and burns it in order to salvage the iron work. Drake nurtures friendly relations with the indigenous people by using patience and gifts. The two groups interact daily and entertain each other with music and dancing. One inhabitant opportunistically snatches Drake's scarlet hat from his head. A sailor raises an arquebuse to fire after the fleeing man but Drake forbids him to shoot by ordering "not to kill a man for a cap." Rather, Drake reacts with humor and does not try to retrieve the stolen item. On 3 June, they weighed anchor and sailed south. Here, Drake received reports of growing discontentment. Doughty's self-promotion has resulted in harsh words with John Saracold. Tensions have also grown among the crew as the gentlemen linger while common sailors toil. Bitter words and blows are exchanged between Doughty and a sailor named Gregory. In the ensuing complaint to captain John Chester, Doughty uses insubordinate language. Later Thomas Doughty and his brother John are ordered aboard Christopher. Thomas refuses so Drake has him forcibly removed, quells a short protest over the matter, and returns to Pelican. Having re-joined the fleet, Swan, which is badly damaged, is abandoned to consolidate the fleet. | |
| 12–14 June | Cape Blanco, Argentina | Period accounts lack agreement as to the location of this anchorage. While Fletcher tells us that the fleet sailed south, others say Drake sailed north and returned to Cape Blanco, the cape Drake had named Cape Hope. Although Christopher is briefly separated from the fleet, she re-joins Drake here. Drake and his crew are warmly greeted by the indigenous inhabitants and exchange gifts. Christopher is unloaded and abandoned. Because Mary is still missing from the fleet, Drake believes if he enters the Strait of Magellan without the ship, they would likely never see her again. Thus, when he weighs anchor, he sets a course that takes them north instead of heading for the strait. | |
| 17–18 June | Puerto Santa Cruz, Argentina | The fleet anchors at this bay only to pause on their way to their next anchorage. | |
| 19 June– 17 August | Port San Julian, Argentina | The crew rejoices when they sight this Patagonian port which was first used by Magellan. With a figure similar to a figure-eight, this port is formed by twin basins and dotted with small islands which calls for especially diligent navigation. A battered, leaking Mary re-joins the fleet on the evening of the 19th. She is eventually stripped, burned, and abandoned here. While relations began well with the indigenous Patagonian inhabitants, they turned tragic when Robert Winterhey, a gentleman, demonstrates his bow to them and the string breaks. One Patagonian puts an arrow into Winterhey and another through a sailor named Oliver. Drake and the other men present protect themselves with shields as a general attack upon the Englishmen ensues. Drake eventually picks up an arquebus and inflicts a devastating wound on the Patagonian who initiated the violence. This scatters the rest of the attackers. Drake does not allow retribution for the two Englishmen's deaths, and the Patagonians do not return. For defensive purposes, Drake positions his crew's camp on a small island within the bay. On 30 June, all crew members are summoned to the island and Drake addresses the tensions involving Doughty by empaneling a jury and convening a trial for capital crimes. Drake prosecutes and Doughty defends. The jury renders a guilty verdict and passes a sentence of death. On 2 July, two days after the trial, Doughty faces the beheading block with dignity and courage. Just before the execution, Drake and Doughty even dine and take the communion sacrament together. Doughty, Winterhey, and Oliver are all buried on the island, and their graves marked with an engraved stone. On another stone, Drake's name is engraved in Latin to record his presence on the island. The exact location of the island is uncertain. Drake subsequently offers Marigold to any who wish to return to England. All decline. During a Sunday religious service, Drake gives a sermon in which he unites the crew by urging that the common sailors cease despising the gentlemen and that the gentlemen work alongside the sailors at all tasks. Morale slowly rises through the month of July as the men prepare the fleet for navigating the Strait of Magellan. On 17 August, the fleet sets sail with the three remaining ships, Marigold, Elizabeth, and Pelican. in July 1578, Drake sent Wynter ashore where he learned from indigenous people that they ate the astringent bark Drimys winteri. The bark would likely aid the Golden Hind and the Elizabeth in avoiding scurvy among their crews. | |
| 20 August– 6 September | Strait of Magellan, Chile | On the 20 August, the fleet passes Cape Virgins which signal the entrance to the series of straits. At this point, they delay for two days until favourable winds allow their entrance into the strait and relatively uninhabited land. During the pause and at a religious service, Drake renames Pelican as Golden Hinde to honor Sir Christopher Hatton. The Hatton crest incorporated a golden hind, and Hatton was the employer of the deceased Thomas Doughty. Fletcher records, "we joyfully entered the Straight with hope of good success." Information about the fleet's passage is most completely found in da Silva's and John Drake's accounts. No one in the fleet, including the Portuguese pilot da Silva, has sailed through these waters and anchorages will be problematic. If the ships should become separated, all captains know they are to rendezvous at 30° south latitude. While currents are favourable, winds vary and shoals and rocks present hazards. On 24 August, they come across the islands Isabel, Marta, and Magdalena. Here, Drake and several crew members go ashore, took possession of the land, and name the island Elizabeth Island. Today it is identified as Isabel Island. This is the first English overseas territorial claim made in Queen Elizabeth's name. The fleet anchors five miles west of the claim. At Magdalena, the crew hunts 3,000 penguins. As they continue, anchorage locations remain uncertain although several possibilities are suggested. The strait narrows at the entrance of Pasa Largo and remains so for 40 nautical miles before spilling into the Pacific. The three vessels depart from the strait on 6 September. The fourteen day passage is by far the fastest passage of the 16th century. | |
| 6 September– 6 October | Southern Pacific west of Chile | Drake enters the Pacific believing that Chile trends northwest instead of north as it actually does. Sailing 70 leagues west into the ocean the fleet is hit by a storm and after 10 days, it worsened. Marigold and her 29 crewmen were lost, and captain Wynter later stated he had never lived through such a terrible tempest. Aboard Golden Hind, Fletcher and John Brewer hear the cries of the doomed seamen. | |
| 7 October | Diego de Almagro Island, Chile | On 7 October, Golden Hinde anchors for only one hour while Wynter remains close to shore in a deep and dangerous bay. This uncertain location of this 40 fathom deep bay is recorded at 51° by da Silva. Raymond Aker suggests the location to be at the east side of Isla Diego de Almargo. A gale strikes and Golden Hinde loses her anchor which forces the two ship fleet to struggle out to sea as they are forced southward and separated. After Golden Hinde and Elizabeth are separated, Wynter returns to the Strait of Magellan instead of the Pacific rendezvous point. He abandons the fleet, enters the strait on 8 October and eventually anchors in England on 2 June 1579. Fletcher assesses the abandonment as partially due to negligence of Elizabeth's commanders and partly due to the desire of crewmen who wanted escape from the difficult conditions. | |
| 14 October | Paso Occidental, Chile | Da Silva records that Golden Hinde anchored at 54 1/2° in 50 fathoms of water and three leagues from the shore. As another uncertain location, Aker suggests the roadstead of Paso Occidental as the ship's anchorage. At this point, his crew is struggling: thirsty, hungry, and in need of firewood. They set sail the next day, and Drake is forced further southward. | |
| 15 October | Basquet Island, Chile | The ship's crew is carefully sounding a bay at this island. The water is studded with barely submerged rocks and rocky islets. The bay is large, 10 miles long and 8 miles wide. Fletcher tells that they gather fresh water and herbs. Before they complete re-provisioning, another tempest strikes and Golden Hinde drags her anchors. Drake and the crew execute skilled seamanship as they are forced through the treacherous waters and head out to sea. Eight crew members, who are in a pinnace which is serving as a tender to Golden Hinde, are unable to follow the ship. They eventually navigate back through the strait to the Atlantic. After much hardship, only Peter Carder survives, and he eventually returns to England in 1586 where he tells his story to the Queen. | |
| 18 October | Cape York Minster, Chile | On the 18th, Golden Hinde lay at anchor in a bay inside what is now called Cape York Minster. With difficulty, the men land to take on fresh water and firewood. They also briefly parlay with the indigenous people there who, by being in canoes, were able to trade with the sailors. Another gale strikes the Golden Hinde, this time so violently that she loses her anchor. Drake is again forced to head to open water. | |
| 24–28 October | Horn Island (named Elizabeth Island by Drake), Chile | Drake anchors in Saint Francis Bay which lies between Horn Island and Hermite Island within the Hermite Islands. Here the men enjoy respite from the adverse weather. Golden Hinde anchors in 20 fathoms of water, and on the next day, they land to gather water, herbs, and firewood. On a day trek, Fletcher uses tools to record the Englishmen's presence on a stone by carving Elizabeth's name, her kingdom, and the date. The stone has not been found. Drake explores the island on foot and takes measurements on the southern-most part of the island, two miles from Golden Hinde's anchorage. Drake names the island Elizabeth Island. He gives this name despite already using it for a different island within the Strait of Magellan. The crew knows the significance of this anchorage: despite conventional wisdom that maintains a continental mass emanates from the south shore of the Strait of Magellan, it is actually a series of islands. Additionally, they learn that no heavy current prevents ships from navigating east through the strait or at the meeting of the two oceans. This discovery contradicts to popular thought of the time. With fair winds, Drake sets sail on 28 October. Fifty days have passed since the crew first encountered storms and violent seas. | |
| 30 October– 1 November | Islas Ildefonso, Chile | Drake anchors at this location which is 72 nautical miles north of Horn Island. Da Silva describes the islands as low and small. The crew hunts seal meat and ducks to provision the ship. Upon leaving, Drake begins a 25-day stretch of nonstop, northerly sailing. | |
| 24 November | Valdivia River, Chile | According to da Silva and Captain San Juan de Antón, whom Drake would later briefly take prisoner, Drake reaches the area near the mouth of this river on 24 November. | |
| 25-26 November | Mocha Island, Chile | This island, situated near the Chilean coast at 38°, is where Drake anchors in 12 fathoms of water a quarter of a league from the land and takes ashore roughly a dozen men. He is met by the indigenous inhabitants, probably Aruacanian people, whom he believes were probably forced from the mainland by Europeans. They give the Englishmen sheep, hens, and grain who then return to Golden Hinde. While the aggressiveness of Native Peoples who had prior encounters with Spaniards suggests caution for the English, the first day's transactions get Drake's guard down. He returns the next day with 10 men for water without firearms and bows: the crew is only armed with shields and swords. Upon landing their boat, two men climb out. The crew is attacked by at least 100 armed Araucanians. The two sailors, Tom Brewer and Tom Flood, are captured and killed. Escaping only by cutting the boat's rope, the boat retreats, but every Englishman is wounded at least once, and two of them soon die of their injuries. Drake takes an arrow into his face under his right eye. The death of Diego several months later is ascribed to the wounds he suffered at Mocha Island. (Note: The World Encompassed and other sources confirm the nature of the attack and closely provide the numbers captured and executed, the numbers of injuries and numbers who died shortly thereafter. Francis Fletcher's account in the Sloane Manuscript No. 61 provides the most details and descriptions of the deaths and cannibalism of the captives. The accounts could allow that two were captured and eaten, one died soon after and Diego was the fourth death, many months later.) When aboard Golden Hinde. Drake's crew urges him to order the ship's guns to fire upon the Aruacanians. Drake refuses and explains to his men that the Aruacanians' hostility is because they mistake the Englishmen for Spaniards who have dealt so poorly with them. Drake desires that his country avoid such a legacy with the people as had Spain. Later in the day, Drake sails Golden Hinde north. | |
| 30 November | Quintero Bay (named Philips Bay by Drake), Chile | This bay is named Philips Bay by Drake, and it marks the first time any of the expedition members set foot on the mainland of Chile . This body of water lies near 32° and is 2 ½ miles wide at its mouth, marks . Here they meet an indigenous man who is rowing in a canoe made of reeds. He comes aboard the ship, is well greeted by Drake, and shows gratitude for the gifts he receives from Drake. This man and several comrades return some hours later with a canoe full of provisions including hens, eggs, and a fat hog. This is insufficient for the Golden Hinde crew so the man offers to guide the ship south to a nearby harbor to seek further provisions. Fletcher refers to their guide as a, "new Indian pilote." | |
| 5-8 December | Valparaíso, Chile | Drake anchors in the bay Valparaíso. The small town Saint James stands along the shore. Here the Englishmen begin their task of taking treasure and provisions from the Spaniards along the Pacific Coast. From town's storehouses, they take 1,770 jars of wine, they loot the town's nine houses and church. From a Spanish ship also anchored in the harbor, the crew easily removes gold, silver, wine, and timber. They are able to sufficiently supply themselves with purloined bread, bacon, and other food. When leaving the harbor, Drake steers Golden Hinde north into the Pacific. | |
| 9 December | Along Chile coast north of Valparaíso, precise location unknown | Drake obliges their guide by setting him ashore at a point the guide chooses. | |
| 12–14 December | Tongoy Bay, Chile | Here, at 30°, is the rendezvous point which lost ships were to rejoin the expedition. Low hills outline the bay which opens to a mile wide mouth. Drake lingers for three days waiting in vain for Elizabeth's return. He sends men ashore to look for water. They find none. Drake leaves the harbor for open sea. | |
| 15–16 December | In the Pacific north of Tongoy Bay, Chile | Da Silva records in his log that Drake sailed only 6 leagues during this time. On the 17th, he notes that Golden Hinde, "Remained stationary." Drake is loitering in the rendezvous area as he hopes for Elizabeth to rejoin him. | |
| 18–19 December | La Herradura, Chile | Here, Drake anchors opposite this 1 ½ mile long cove instead of sailing directly into it. In the morning of the 19th, crew members go ashore to look for water. They take two large pigs and several small ones. At 1:00 that afternoon, they are attacked by the Spaniards. Da Silva records the number of horsemen as 250 and Fletcher estimates 100. Following the horsemen are 200 indigenous men on foot. In the ensuing attack, Richard Minivy is killed before Drake is able to come with a boat and rescue the others. The Spaniards mutilate the Englishman's body by cutting off the head and right hand before plucking out the heart and carrying them all away. The crew later returns and buries the body. When they return to the vessel and make to sail, Spaniards return to the shore with a flag of truce. Drake mistrusts this gesture and departs. | |
| 19 December | Pájaros Rocks, Chile | Shortly after leaving Herradura, the crew tries to sail past these two tight collections of rocky islets and into the port of Coquimbo. The islets stand about 1 mile north of La Herradura's entrance. The channel is an area adversely affected by a 700 wide rocky channel, strong winds, current, and swell. In attempting to enter the port, Drake narrowly escapes losing his ship. The resulting damage causes a leak that afflicts Golden Hinde for months. | |
| 21 December | Pájaros Islands, Chile | These two imposing and steeply sided rocks rise on either side of the channel which separates them, and are situated 21 miles farther north of the dangerous rocks Drake encountered on the previous day. The crew takes some birds, possibly penguins, but the ship drags her anchors and they forced to sail on after only a brief stay. Da Silva's log places this anchorage on the 21st. No other period record mentions it. | |
| 20 or 22 December-19 January | Madio Cove at Salada Bay, Chile | The expedition finds a cove within Salada Bay a convenient harbor. It is uninhabited, and here is where they will spend Christmas and celebrate New Year's Day. The crew careens, cleans, and caulks Golden Hinde's hull. They also adjust the ship's ballast. The men are able to catch hundreds of fish a day, and Fletcher writes that this is one of the most abundant anchorages since they first embarked upon the voyage. During this interlude, the crew unloads lumber from their ship to build a pinnace which is launched on the afternoon of 9 January. The next day Drake sails the pinnace southward in a futile attempt to find and reunite with Elizabeth. Fletcher writes that the pinnace was forced back to harbor after only one day of sailing due to "the winde being contrary." Da Silva records the pinnace returned on 12 January after being forced to return "because natives came from the shore." Fletcher places the date of arrival to this anchorage on the 20 Dec while da Silva records the date as the 22 Dec. Both record 19 January as the day Drake sails from this location and takes the expedition farther north. | |

== 1579 ==
| Date | Location | Details | Ref(s) |
| 1 February [O.S. 22 January] 1579 | Pan de Azucar, Chile | From 22 January to 25 January, period sources lack agreement as to locations and dates. Here, the crew anchors along an island only a few hundred yards from the mainland. The possible location is situated today roughly 30 miles north of Copiapó, Chile. They encounter four Camanchaca fishermen, invite them aboard Golden Hinde, and present them with food and gifts. The fishermen indicate that water is not readily available ashore, so Drake continues sailing ahead of the continually favourable southerly wind. | |
| 22 January O.S. (all following dates are O.S.) | Santa Maria Island, Chile | Drake comes across more fishermen, four in canoes. They guide Golden Hinde crewmen to fresh water. | |
| 24 or 25 January | Coloso, Chile | Drake see three fishermen who are on the mainland. He takes a pinnace ashore and invites the fishermen to board Golden Hinde. He also confiscates half of the fish he finds with them. From this location Drake is able to see mountains which lie to the north. To him, this indicates the probability of a fresh water supply. | |
| 4 February | Pisagua, Chile | From Golden Hinde, crewmembers see houses near the shore and anchor close by in shallow water. A landing party finds and takes the load of silver bars off seven llamas. While continuing their search for water, the crew lands again close by. Here they find a Spanish man accompanied by an indigenous boy. From the Spaniard, they purloin additional silver. | |
| 6–7 February | Arica, Chile | Drake's last landing in Chile is at this port with a town of about 20 houses. The Englishmen are impressed with the pleasant and fertile setting. Two small, Spanish ships lie at anchor and are pillaged by the Englishmen. They take 37 bars of silver and almost 300 jars of wine. A Fleming, Nicolas Jorje who is a pilot serving aboard one of the Spanish ships, it impressed by Drake. The Englishmen attempt a landing to search for additional booty, but church bells raise the alarm. The threat of armed horsemen send the Golden Hinde crew back to their ship. While in Arica, Drake learns that in neighboring port at Chule, Peru, there is a ship bearing 800 bars of silver. | |
| 8–9 February | Chule, Peru | A pinnace has set out from Arica to Chule with the warning of Drake's intentions. The Spanish warning is successful and the cargo is unloaded two hours before Drake arrives. The town's people jeer his failure to take the treasure and shout, "Go you thief!" Drake is able to take is some linen from another ship which is anchored nearby. Drake sails away with a bit of fresh water and the Spanish ship. While still close to the shore, Drake sets the ship adrift with her mainsail and foresail set. He has lost the advantage of surprise. Drake impresses two pilots. | |
| 10 February | Sailing along the Peruvian coast north of Chule | Records are vague regarding exact location. On this day, Drake's crew encounter two Spanish ships. One has nothing of value for plunder, the other contains 200 jars of wine. | |
| 15 February | About 12° latitude along the Peruvian coast | With the wind still at her back, Golden Hinde is continuing north. At about 25 miles before Callao, she encounters a Spanish vessel which Drake stops. In the ensuing questioning, the captain, Gasper Martin, informs Drake of two possible prizes. He learns of a ship anchored at Callao, belonging to Miguel Angel, which is taking a cargo of silver to Panama. Drake is also informed that another ship, Nuestra Señora de la Concepción, informally referred to as Cacafuego, has recently departed from the port. She is a 120-ton vessel commanded by Captain San Juan de Antón who is entirely unaware of any threat from English ships. Since the Spanish vessel is heavily laden with silver and will be stopping at other ports, Drake believes he can overtake her. Drake impresses two men from the ship and releases her. | |
| 15 February or 15–16 February | Callao, Peru | Drake arrives to this port for Lima at night. Golden Hinde strikes a shoal as she sails through Boquerón Channel. After Drake threatens to hang the pilots he had recently impressed, the vessel makes way without further trouble. The harbor holds an uncertain number of ships: reports vary from as low as nine to as many as 30. All are almost entirely empty of crew. As Golden Hinde is in the harbor San Cristobol arrives from Panama and sails in. A skirmish for the ship ensues as Drake's men swarm aboard. One of Drake's men is shot, and the Spaniards flee to shore in a boat. Drake's crew leaves the harbor aboard both vessels, Golden Hinde and San Cristobol. With them, they carry eight prisoners. (Note: Identified as "four men and four negroes.") Da Silva records that they left Callao on the 15th and Fletcher records the 16th as the day of their departure. | |
| 16 February | Along the northern coast of Callao, Peru | Two Spanish ships, carrying about 300 men, pursue Drake. Nuestra Seńora del Valle is commanded by Trejo and Pedro de Arana commands Nao de Muriles. The vessels, which have never faced threats in the Pacific, carry no cannons and few firearms. They pursue Drake for only a short while and fail to catch him. Drake releases San Cristobol to the eight prisoners, and continues up the coast three days behind Nuestra Seńora de la Concepción. Immediately after this failure, the viceroy will outfit another two ships and a launch to again pursue Golden Hinde. Although directed to pursue as far as Nicaragua, the vessels of 120 soldiers commanded by Pedro Sarmiento de Gamboa proceed only to Panama before returning without catching Drake. | |
| 20 February | Paita, Peru | As Golden Hinde sails north, the crew takes a vessel bound for Lima at Paita. They meet no resistance as most of the vessel's crew flees by swimming for shore. Drake learns from the captured pilot, Custodio Rodriguez, that he is within two days of catching Nuestra Seńora de la Concepción. So, Drake continues his pursuit. | |
| 20 February | Punta Pariñas, Peru | Running before a stiff wind, Drake makes three to four knots and shortly boards another ship which belongs to Gonzálo Alvarez. Even though it carries a cargo of merchandise, Drake releases it. | |
| 28 February | Near the equator off the coast of Ecuador | Drake captures a Panama bound ship belonging to Benito Diaz Bravo. His crew removes gold, silver, ships' tackle, and food from the prize. Diaz Bravo estimates these losses at 22,000 pesos. Following his usual practice, Drake liberates four Black slaves and offers them employment on Golden Hinde at the same rate as the rest of his crew. (Note: The First Declaration of John Drake in Nuttall (p. 31) states that one of the freed Black men arrived at New Albion and left on the Pacific Crossing.) Golden Hinde crewmen test Diaz Bravo's ship for sailing worthiness. Providing a pinnace for Diaz Bravo's crew, Drake directs the crew to remove their belongings and board a pinnace he provides. Diaz Bravo pleads to Drake, asking that Drake not deny Diaz Bravo his only property. Drake relents and returns the vessel to her owner. One of the Black seamen informs Drake that the vessel's clerk, Francisco Jacome, has hidden treasure on the vessel. When confronted with this by Drake, Jacome denies the accusations. Disbelieving the clerk, Drake has a rope placed around Jacome's neck to compel information. Drake momentarily hoists the clerk from the deck, drops him into the sea, and retrieves him from the water with a boat. At this point, Drake is satisfied Jacome is truthful and allows him to releases him without further violence. Before departing, Drake has several sails removed from Diaz Bravo's ship and casts them into the sea. This hinders the vessel from moving quickly and spreading the alarm that Golden Hinde is nearby. | |
| 1–6 March | Cape San Francisco, Ecuador | As Golden Hinde sails nears the cape, the crew scans the sea for Nuestra Seńora de la Concepción. Drake has offered the prize of a gold chain to he who first sights the vessel. At mid-day, she is first sighted by John Drake who spots her from the crow's-nest. She sails four leagues seaward from Golden Hinde. To avoid alarming Nuestra Seńora de la Concepción's crew by approaching quickly, Drake orders wine jars be dragged behind his ship. Nine hours later, Golden Hinde and a pinnace approach. Drake orders Antón to strike sail. Antón refuses and Drake responds with a formidable volley of arrows and arqueubus shot. Artillery, firing chainballs, bring down the vessel's mizzen mast. Eleven Spanish crew and passengers seek shelter below deck and leave Antón to stand alone against the English threat. The pinnace grapples alongside the treasure ship and swarms over it. Antón surrenders and is taken to Drake's cabin where he is embraced and treated well. Drake takes both ships farther out to sea where, over the course of several days, the Spanish treasure is transferred to Golden Hinde. The haul is immense: 80 pounds of gold, 26 tons of silver, and 13 or 14 chests of reals is removed along with two casks of water, food, tackle, sails, and canvas. This amounts to £126,000 which equals half of Elizabeth's annual revenue. An additional £4,800 of unregistered cargo is taken. A young sailor aboard the ship suggests that the ship not be informally called the Cacafuego (Spitfire or Shitfire), but rather it should be known as Cacaplata (Silver-Shitter). Before Antón's passengers and crew are allowed to sail away, Drake personally bestows upon each of them valuable gifts, provides Antón a safe conduct pass, and releases the pilot, Jorje. Drake also charges Antón to beg the Viceroy of Peru to spare the lives of the Englishmen captured during John Oxenham's failed expedition. After indicating to Antón that he will be back in England within six months, Drake sails Golden Hinde north. The large amount of treasure intensifies the problem of her leaking hull. | |
| 13-15 March or 16–24 March | Coronado Bay, Caño Island, Costa Rica | Period sources disagree regarding the exact day of landfall with this island off the coast of Costa Rica. At this point, Drake is not at the territory he knows as New Spain. Fletcher and Da Silva imply there were two anchorages here. The second anchorage is in the southeast corner of Coronado Bay since it was near a suitable careenage site. The first is located a mile off what is today called River Drake where the sailors found water and wood. Spanish mariner Pedro Sarmiento de Gamboa notes that despite being careened here, Golden Hinde has a serious leak and is in much need of caulking. Since the men need to refit Golden Hinde, they careen their ship to clean the hull of barnacles and collect food, water, and wood. Fletcher notes that they are hit by an earthquake powerful enough to shake the ship. Drake uses a scouting pinnace and takes another prize, a bark owned by Rodrigo Tello, off the coast of Nicaragua. He places the all the prisoners, except one, into the pinnace and exchanges it for Tello's vessel. Along with the prisoner, Alonso Sanchez Colchero, he take charts and dispatches from the Viceroy and King Philip II that were intended for the Philippine governor. Both, he hopes, will aid him for his eventual journey across the Pacific. When Drake leaves the island, he sails with both ships. | |
| 4 April | Off the Pacific coast of Guatemala | After skirting the coast of New Spain since March 30, Golden Hinde and Tello's bark come across another prize this day at one hour before sunrise. Most of the Spanish crew on this ship of Don Francisco Zarate are asleep. Calling out falsely to be the ship of Miguel Angel from Peru, Drake's crew is able to fool the Spaniards as to their identity and take easily take the ship. Along with silk, linen, food, and water, Drake also removes four chests of Chinese porcelain ware. Also leaving the ship to travel aboard Golden Hinde is a Black woman, Maria. Drake takes another pilot, Jaun Pascual and leaves behind Colchero. As Colchero has refused to cooperate, Drake hopes Pascual will prove useful. Later that day, Drake continues north along the coast. Drake is disgusted with the poor condition of Zarate's ship. He threatens to hang the ship's pilot for carrying such a fine gentleman as Zarate on a ship of ruinous conditions. Before he leaves Zarate's ship, he gives gifts to each person aboard the ship and presents Zarate with a safe conduct pass. Zarate notes the weight and damage Golden Hind has suffered and considers repairs to the ship as urgent. | |
| 13–16 April | Guatulco, Mexico | As Drake approaches the shore of this settlement, the Spanish pilot assures him that it is not defended by soldiers. He quickly takes a ship and her merchandise in the port and severed her bowsprit and topmasts. Drake frees "three Negroes that had conspired the burning of the towne..." The townspeople hide in the woods as the Englishmen plunder the town. They take water, food, and clothing, smash religious symbols within the church and remove the bell from its belfry. Drake spends most of his time aboard Golden Hinde politely entertaining hostages—town dignitaries—which include the alcalde, Gaspar de Vargas. While anchored, Drake consults with da Silva over a map as the two consider options for returning to England. Da Silva believes Drake will sail north with his two vessels to search for the fabled Strait of Anian. Drake releases da Silva here after 15 months of impressed service. While in the harbor, Drake prepares for open sea sailing from this location by dismounting his artillery and sealing the gun ports by closing and caulking them. | |
| 16 April–possibly 4 June | In the Pacific west of Guatulco | Drake is briefly becalmed when he exits the harbor. He eventually makes his way 500 leagues west into the Pacific until he catches the northeast trade winds belt. Period sources indicate that Drake then navigates either to the 48th or the 42nd parallel before he quits his northerly course, turns toward land, and follows the coast southward. Cold weather prevents further penetration into the northern latitudes. | Critical northern Pacific expedition period sources information such as latitudes, timedates and unique coastal features sightings information have to be taken with a grain of salt according to Drake biographer Harry Kelsey: "English authorities had determined to keep details of the voyage secret after Drake returned. []To accomplish their goal, English authorities gave out a series of changing and conflicting accounts". |
| 5 June | Possibly South Cove at Cape Arago, Oregon | Contrary winds force Drake to run towards shore and seek shelter for his two ships at what Fletcher terms, "a bad bay." They do not land. Drake realizes the Strait of Anian has eluded him and knows he must circumnavigate to return home. Drake decides to seek safe harbor to careen and refit Golden Hinde in preparation for the trans-Pacific journey. He steers south to run along the coast. | |
| Possibly 17 June–23 July | Possibly Drakes Bay and Drake's Cove near Point Reyes, California | Near 38° latitude, Fletcher writes that it "pleased God to send us into a faire and good Baye with a goode winde to enter the same." While anchored in the bay, the crew makes first contact with a lone man in a canoe with whom they exchange gifts. He is of the Coast Miwok people and it is their first contact with Europeans. The ships reposition from the bay into what is now known as Drakes Estero and anchor in what is now called Drake's Cove. The crew encamps and careens Golden Hinde so to prepare her for sailing across the Pacific. The crewmen are visited by a large contingent of Coast Miwok who hold a ceremony where they give speeches and place a feathered crown upon Drake's head. Later, Drake has a plate of brass fashioned that names the land Nova Albion (New Albion) and claims the region for his queen. Drake chooses this name for two reasons: first, the white banks and cliffs which he saw were similar to those found on the English coast and, second, because Albion was an archaic name by which the island of Great Britain was known During this stay, Drake treks up and into the country to visit an inland Coast Miwok village. Fletcher notes the striking difference of the pleasant inland area compared to the cold and foggy shoreline where the men's encampment lies. Fletcher also records details of the people, homes, baskets, language as well as detailed descriptions of the flora and fauna. All interactions between the Coast Miwok and Englishmen are friendly. The Coast Miwok show distress as Golden Hinde sails into the Pacific over a month after first arriving here. Drake leaves behind Tello's bark and Chinese porcelain ware. | |
| July 24 | Possibly Farallon Islands, California | The next day, Drake makes landfall at these California islands which lie southwest of Drake's Bay, and he names them the Islands of Saint James. Golden Hinde anchors while the crew takes seals and birds for food before they embark on the Pacific crossing. | |
| 30 September– 3 October | Palau, Caroline Islands | Drake anchors at Palau Island in the Carolinian Archipelago of present-day Micronesia. He has been at sea for 68 days without sighting land. Multitudes of the people arrive in canoes and swarm the ship. After brief trading, they begin taking what they please and begin fighting among themselves. Golden Hinde sailors get the people off the ship, but find themselves under fire from darts and arrows. After one ineffectual warning shot, Drake reluctantly directs artillery fire into the group. Mangling canoes and people, the damage scatters survivors. The Englishmen name this the Island of Thieves and sail on. Fletcher writes, "Till the third of October wee could not get cleare of these consorts." | |
| 16–21 October | Mindanao, Philippines | Drake makes landfall at four islands which Golden Hinde coasts until 21 October when they anchor to search for water at the largest, Mindanao. This is the first time since the expedition left California, three months earlier, that his crew has landed. | |
| 23 October | Sarangani Islands | South of Mindanao, Golden Hinde sails between two islands and is approached by men in two canoes. The two groups would have liked to talk to each other but are unable to as winds push Golden Hinde southwards toward the Indonesian Islands. | |
| 24 October | Louisa Bank, Indonesia | While sailing near these banks, Drake spies a Portuguese ship he hopes to take as a prize. Seeing this, the ship sails into shallow water and Drake declines to pursue. | |
| 25 October | Sangi and Siau Islands, Indonesia in the Celebes Sea | Between these two islands, Drake encounters two fishermen—who live on Siau—whom he recruits to pilot Golden Hinde through Siau Passage to the Moluccas. | |
| 2 November | Suaro Island, Indonesia | Fletcher notes that, from this point, they have sighted at their desired destination: the Moluccas. | |
| 3–9 November | Ternate, Moluccas | Within this archipelago, Drake finds the Sultan of Ternate anxious to do business with the Englishmen due to political reasons. The Sultan, Babu, who controls the bulk of the clove trade in the area, sends three galleys to ceremonially greet Drake and tow Golden Hinde to her anchorage. As the Sultan's vessel approaches, Drake responds with a gun salute, and the two vessels are joined. A solemn verbal agreement is made in which Drake pledges English ships to the Sultan within two years. The Sultan offers the promise of the clove trade to Elizabeth and the two men exchange valuable gifts. Golden Hinde is loaded with six tons of cloves and sails west. | (Note: Diego died in the vicinity of the Moluccas. See Kaufmann for a full discussion.) |
| 14 November – 12 December | little iland southward of Celebes | The location is so referred to by Fletcher who puts "little iland" at "1 deg. 40 min. toward the pole anartike." Historian John Sugden places the island in the Banggai Archipelago and Turner identifies as Potil Island. Despite being uninhabited, it is a pleasant, wooded location with plentiful water and food. Those who were weak with sickness, recover quickly. Again, Fletcher records details of the flora and fauna. The crewmen careen Golden Hinde and make preparations to exit these waters and cross the Indian Ocean. In his deposition to the Inquisition, John Drake stated that Maria and three Black men were left on the island "to found a settlement, leaving them rice, seeds and means of making fire. Another period source states that the woman was simply abandoned upon the island. | |

== 1580 ==
| Date | Location | Details | Ref(s) |
| 19-20 January [O.S. 9-10 January] 1580 | Vesuvius Reef | After sailing westward through the Kaloembangan Strait, Drake enters the greatest region of shoals and straits he has encountered on this voyage. After successfully threading his way through the dangerous waters, in the darkness of 8:00 that night, Drake runs Golden Hinde onto a reef where she is trapped. A stiff wind heels her to one side and holds her tight. While various sites have been suggested for this uncertain location, most recent scholarship identifies it as Vesuvius Reef. Fletcher records location as one or two minutes shy of two degrees south latitude, and he writes that this was the expedition's greatest encounter with danger. Before pumping water from the hold, Drake first calls the men to kneel and pray. Soon, it is clear the ship's timbers are solid. Drake tries to kedge the ship's way off the reef. This is when they learn of the reef's sharp rise from the floor: only a boat length from the ship, sailors sound 300 fathoms and fail to find bottom. Kedging is impossible. The Englishmen resort to lightening the ship so that she could ride higher in the water. Artillery pieces, spices, and victuals were among the items jettisoned. At 4:00 on the afternoon of 10 January, the wind slackens and Golden Hinde releases from the reef. The only damage is a slight leak. At one point during the dilemma, Fletcher sermonizes that their plight results from God's wrath due to Drake's execution of Doughty. After the ship is freed, Drake angrily excommunicates Fletcher, chains him to a hatch, and hangs a sign on him which states: "Frances fletcher, ye falseth knave that liveth." | |
| 14 January O.S. (all following dates are O.S.) | Wowoni Island, Indonesia | The crew spends the day anchored at this island to gather wood and water. | |
| 26 January– February 6 | In the seas southwest of Celebes | Almost a week after clearing Celebes, Golden Hinde is met with westerly gales that relentlessly drive her east into the Banda Sea. The crew sights islands and seeks anchorages, but none are possible until they make landfall at Damar Island. | |
| 6–10 February | Damar Island, Indonesia | On the second day after the crew spots five islands, casts anchor at the largest, and goes ashore to collect water and wood. While sailing from this anchorage two days later, they are met by people in canoes who invite Drake's crew to their town. Drake anchors and crewmembers visit the town. Fletcher, who spelled Indonesian names phonetically, records the name of the town as Baratiua. Turner identifies it as modern day Bebar at Damar Ilands's other principal anchorage. The Englishmen find the island to be rich in metals such as gold, silver, copper, and tin which the people work into various forms. There is much fresh food and spices including nutmeg, pepper, ginger, lemons, figs, and cucumbers. Fletcher is impressed with the inhabitant's comely stature, civil demeanor, and courtesy toward strangers. He describes the dress of both the men and women. Other than Ternate, the Golden Hinde's crew finds this to their most comfortable and refreshing stay. | |
| 10–17 February | Among Indonesian Islands between Damar and Rusa | With the winds now favourable, Drake is able to resume his homeward journey, and Golden Hinde passes several islands. On 12th and near the latitude of 8° 4', Drake passes along the northern shores of the islands Moa, Leti, and Kisar. Fletcher records that on the 14th and 16th they pass by additional islands located at 9° 40'. Since no islands exist here, Aker identifies these islands to be those which stand at 8° 40'. These indicates that Drake passed Atauro and Liran on the 14th and Alor, Kisar, Pantar and Batan on the 16th. He then went through the Alor Strait and steered for his next anchorage. | |
| 18-19 February | Rusa Island, Indonesia | Drake anchors his ship at this little island where they are able to acquire firewood. The only food they could obtain is two turtles. | |
| 9-26 March | Cilacap, Java | Drake sails Golden Hinde to the south of Java so that he could avoid the Portuguese who controlled the Malacca Strait and may have been as far as 50 miles south of the island. By going to the south coast of the island, he establishes that it is indeed an island and not an extension of the supposed continent Terra Australis. He will anchor at three different locations on the island. On the 10th, Drake anchors on a shoal two miles off the coast. On the 11th, he moves the ship to the islands northeast sheltered shore and into a cove near a town where he anchors and takes water. Drake sends a boat ashore to interact with the Java inhabitants and repositions Golden Hinde once more, moving closer to the town. On the 12th, Drake sends men ashore with gifts of linen, wool, and silk cloth which are well received by the king. In return, the king sends rice, hens and other food. Fletcher writes of the political leaders and notes the happy visits and exchanges the Englishmen have with the people of Java. Drake happily entertains them and Fletcher notes that they particularly enjoy the Golden Hinde's musicians. Fletcher also writes that the Java music was, "of a very strange kind, yet the sound was pleasant and delightfull." These visits and exchanges delay the crew from attending to badly needed maintenance on their ship. Her hull has collected so much shell fish that her sailing is greatly hindered. Finally, Drake either grounds or careens the ship for refitting. This is a crucial stop for Drake. From here, he will be at sea for months before his next landing. | |
| 21 May | East African coast | Fletcher records that since leaving Java on 26 March and sailing west-southwest toward the Cape of Good Hope that the crew had been "without touch and ought, but aire and water, till the 21 of May, when we espied land (to wit, a part of the maine of Africa), in some places very high, under the latitude of 31 deg, and halfe." | |
| 2 June | Plymouth Sound, England | After abandoning the expedition in October 1578 at the Strait of Magellan, John Wynter and his crew arrive aboard Elizabeth back in England. | |
| 15 June | Cape of Good Hope, South Africa | Golden Hinde sails so close to the cape that it is within range of her guns. Drake rounds the cape without stopping. | |
| 15 July | Cestos River, Liberia | Golden Hinde makes landfall at the mouth of the river where there are many fishermen in their boats. The fishermen come near the English ship but she sails on without any interaction between the two groups of people. | |
| 22 July | White Man's Bay, Freetown, Sierra Leone | Drake and his crew have completed a 9,700 mile run from Java to Sierra Leone. The water supply is at a critical level with only one pint for every three men. John Drake believes that only two or three days longer without water replenishment would result in crewmens' deaths. Here, theGolden Hinde crewmen are able to take aboard the desperately needed water and fresh fruit. Here, too, the Englishmen see elephants. To clean the ship's hull, the crew heels her without fully careening the vessel. This allows for most, but not all, of the hull to be cleaned. | |
| 26-28 September | Plymouth Sound, England | After 1046 days of absence from England Drake exercises caution as he enters English waters. He knows it is possible that he is out of favour since the political situation may have altered during his voyage. So, as Golden Hinde sails off Rame Head and heads into Plymouth Sound, Drake hails a fisherman and asks, "Is the queen alive and well?" Using discretion, he casts anchor on Saint Nicholas Island's seaward side so his ship is hidden from the city. Drake sends John Brewer to Sir Christopher Hatton with the news of Golden Hinde's return. Brewer will return three days later with Elizabeth's assurance that Drake has nothing to fear. Fletcher summarizes the voyage at its conclusion as "seeing the wonders of the Lord in the deep, in discouering so many admirable things, in going through with so many strange aduentures, in escaping out of so many dangers, and ouercomming so many difficulties in this our encompassing of this neather globe, and passing round about the world, which we haue related." | |
