= Cold war (term) =

Conflict not involving military action

A cold war is a state of conflict between nations that does not involve direct military action but is pursued primarily through economic and political actions, propaganda, acts of espionage or proxy wars waged by surrogates. This term is most commonly used to refer to the American–Soviet Cold War of 1947–1991. The surrogates are typically states that are satellites of the conflicting nations, i.e., nations allied to them or under their political influence. Opponents in a cold war will often provide economic or military aid, such as weapons, tactical support or military advisors, to lesser nations involved in conflicts with the opposing country.

== Origins of the term ==
The expression "cold war" was rarely used before 1945. Some writers credit the fourteenth-century Spaniard Don Juan Manuel for first using the term (in Spanish) regarding the conflict between Christianity and Islam; however, the term employed was "tepid" rather than "cold". The word "cold" first appeared in a faulty translation of his work in the 19th century.

In 1934, the term was used in reference to a faith healer who received medical treatment after being bitten by a snake. The newspaper report referred to medical staff's suggestion that faith had played a role in his survival as a "truce in the cold war between science and religion".

Regarding its contemporary application to a conflict between nation-states, the phrase appears for the first time in English in an anonymous editorial published in The Nation Magazine in March 1938 titled "Hitler's Cold War". The phrase was then used sporadically in newspapers throughout the summer of 1939 to describe the nervous tension and spectre of arms-buildup and mass-conscription prevailing on the European continent (above all in Poland) on the eve of World War II. It was described as either a "cold war" or a "hot peace" in which armies were amassing in many European countries. Graham Hutton, Associate Editor of The Economist, used the term in his essay titled "The Next Peace," published in the August 1939 edition of The Atlantic Monthly (today The Atlantic). It elaborated on the notion of cold war perhaps more than any English-language invocation of the term to that point, and garnered a least one sympathetic reaction in a subsequent newspaper column. The Poles claimed that this period involved "provocation by manufactured incidents." It was also speculated that cold war tactics by the Germans could weaken Poland's resistance to invasion.

During the war, the term was also used in less lasting ways, for example to describe the prospect of winter warfare, or in opinion columns encouraging American politicians to make a cool-headed assessment before deciding whether to join the war or not.

At the end of World War II, George Orwell used the term in the essay "You and the Atom Bomb," published on October 19, 1945, in the British magazine Tribune. Contemplating a world living in the shadow of the threat of nuclear war, he warned of a "peace that is no peace," which he called a permanent "cold war". Orwell directly referred to that war as the ideological confrontation between the Soviet Union and the Western powers. Moreover, in The Observer of March 10, 1946, Orwell wrote that "[a]fter the Moscow conference last December, Russia began to make a 'cold war' on Britain and the British Empire."

The definition which has now become fixed is of a war waged through indirect conflict. The first use of the term in this sense, to describe the post–World War II geopolitical tensions between the USSR and its satellites and the United States and its western European allies, is attributed to Bernard Baruch, an American financier and presidential advisor. In South Carolina, on April 16, 1947, he delivered a speech (by journalist Herbert Bayard Swope) saying, "Let us not be deceived: we are today in the midst of a cold war." Newspaper reporter-columnist Walter Lippmann gave the term wide currency, with the book Cold War (1947).

The term "hot war" is also occasionally used by contrast, but remains rare in literature on military theory.

According to academic Covell Meyskens, the term "cold war" was not employed in China during the Maoist era.

== Tensions labeled a cold war ==
Since the US–USSR Cold War (1947–1991), a number of global and regional tensions have also been called a cold war, both historical and modern.

=== 16th-century England and Spain ===
In his 1964 article of Francis Drake's New Albion claim, Adolph S. Oko Jr. described certain 16th century tensions between England and Spain as a cold war.

=== Great Game ===
The Great Game, a colonial confrontation that occurred between the 19th century British and Russian Empires in Asia, has been variously described as a cold war, though this has also been disputed.

=== Second Cold War ===
The Second Cold War, also called Cold War II, Cold War 2.0, or the New Cold War, is a term describing post-Cold-War era of political and military tensions between the United States and either Russia or China.

=== Middle East ===
Malcolm H. Kerr first coined the term "Arab Cold War" to refer to a political conflict inside the Arab world between Nasserist republics defending Arab socialism, Pan-Arabism, and Arab nationalism led by Nasser's Egypt, against traditionalist monarchies led by Saudi Arabia.

An Atlantic Council member Bilal Y. Saab, an About.com writer Primoz Manfreda, an Iranian scholar Seyyed Hossein Mousavian and a Princeton University scholar Sina Toossi, journalist Kim Ghattas, Foreign Policy journalist Yochi Dreazen, Brookings Institution researcher Sultan Barakat, and Newsweek journalist Jonathan Broder use the term "cold war" to refer to tensions between Saudi Arabia and Iran. In February 2016, a University of Isfahan professor Ali Omidi dismissed the assumptions that the conflict between Iran and Saudi Arabia would grow tense.

=== South Asia ===
Commentator Ehsan Ahrari, writer Bruce Riedel, political commentator Sanjaya Baru and Princeton University academic Zia Mian have used the term "cold war" since 2002 to refer to long-term tensions between India and Pakistan, which were part of British India until its partition in 1947.

=== East Asia ===
Naval Postgraduate School academic Edward A. Olsen, British politician David Alton, York University professor Hyun Ok Park, and University of Southern California professor David C. Kang used the term to refer to tensions between North Korea and South Korea, which have been divided since the end of World War II in 1945. They interchangeably called it the "Korean Cold War". In August 2019, the North Korean government said that further US–South Korean military cooperation would prompt North Korea to "trigger a new cold war on the Korean Peninsula and in the region."

China's Defense Ministry spokesman Geng Yansheng, The Diplomat editor Shannon Tiezzi, and The Guardian columnist Simon Tisdall used the term to refer to tensions between China and Japan.

=== China and the Soviet Union ===
British writer Edward Crankshaw used the term to also refer to the Sino-Soviet relations after the Sino-Soviet split. "Spy wars" also occurred between the USSR and China.

=== China and India ===
Imran Ali Sandano of the University of Sindh, Arup K. Chatterjee of the Jindal Global Law School, journalist Bertil Lintner, writer Bruno Maçães, politician-lawyer P. Chidambaram, politician and journalist Sanjay Jha, and some others use the terms like "new cold war" to refer to growing tensions between China and India.

=== US cold civil war ===
In spring 2017, professor emeritus Angelo Codevilla used the term "cold civil war" to criticize "the ruling class—government bureaucracies, the judiciary, academia, media, associated client groups, Democratic officials, and Democrat-controlled jurisdictions"—and what Codevilla considered "against a majority of the American people and their way of life."

In 2017 and 2019, journalist Carl Bernstein criticized then-President Donald Trump, whom he called in 2019 "a sham, a con, a grifter [...] president of the United States", for exacerbating what Bernstein considered "cold civil war", citing in 2017 Trump administration's scapegoating of Hillary Clinton amid the Mueller special counsel investigation and in 2019 his efforts to appeal "prejudices" of his supporters toward "the other side" whom they wanted "wiped out".

The Washington Post columnist Matt Bai in January 2021 used "a Cold Civil War" in reference to the US "imminent disunion", especially by rural Americans who "live increasingly in their own reality, nourished by their own 'alternative facts' and led by their own reckless leaders" and "separate themselves from [American] urban culture and establishment media".

A media studies professor David A. Love in March 2021 criticized the US Republican Party for instigating "a cold civil war by pushing for unprecedented voter suppression measures targeting minority and marginalised communities".

A Governing magazine contributor Tony Woodlief in October 2021 criticized "political pundits", their use of the term, and their emphases of political class divide for "overlook[ing] ample data illuminating substantial common ground among Americans."

== See also ==
- Iron Curtain
- Decolonization
