= Drake Navigators Guild =

The Drake Navigators Guild is the historical research group which has used multi-disciplinary methods to research Francis Drake’s visit to the west coast of North America in 1579 and related maritime explorations. Founded in 1949, the Guild’s research supports the long-standing conclusion that Drake’s “Nova Albion” is at Drakes Bay, California. The Guild's efforts build on the research of Professor George Davidson (geographer) and others who have studied Drake's voyage. The Guild’s research has identified the specific careening site at Drake’s Cove within the Bay.

== Founding ==
The Drake Navigators Guild began as an informal group of historians and mariners in 1949. It was incorporated as a non-profit organization in 1954.

== Officers ==
Chester W. Nimitz, Honorary Chairman

Robert D. Marshall, President

Adolph S. Oko, Jr., President

Raymond Aker, President (deceased January 2003)

Edward Von der Porten, President (deceased April 2018)

Steve Wright

== Multi-disciplinary research ==
The Guild supports involving experts in all applicable disciplines who can help understand Drake's travels and landing sites. These include archaeology, botany, cartography, Chinese porcelains, ethnography, geology, hydrography, marine biology, marine expeditions, museology, Native American studies, nautical history, navigation, seamanship, ship construction, and zoology.

== Archaeology ==
Following up on early archaeological work, the Guild conducted independent archaeological investigations of the Drakes Bay region from 1951 to 1961. Under the auspices of Santa Rosa Junior College, the Guild conducted archaeological excavations from 1961 into the 1980s. "It was recognized that it (archaeology) might yield corroborative evidence" related to Drake's landing site.

== Biology ==
Biological references are included in the historical record. The Guild has investigated the mammals reported. These include the strange kind of Conies with the tail of a Rat, being of great length leading to its identification as the Botta Pocket Gopher (Thomoys bottae bottae) and the elk.

== Botany ==
The records of Drake's California landing include botanical references. These have been evaluated by the Guild, including the identification of the "Herbe Much Like Our Letcuce."

== Cartography ==
The cartographic evidence related to Drake's landing have been evaluated in depth by the Guild. These include the Jodocus Hondius map and the many more maps showing Drakes Bay.

== Chinese ceramics ==
The Guild's extensive work on the porcelains of Drake and Cermeño along with those of other cargos from across the globe have firmly established that two different cargoes have been found at Drakes Bay native American sites.

== Geology ==
The geology of the Pacific coast has been investigated by the Guild and its collaborators. The north-Pacific coast is dominated by the volcanic basalts and hardened sedimentary rock that produce sea mounts and other dangerous rocks. Moving south, a mariner finds a very different geology in Marin County, CA where the San Andreas fault has moved the white cliffs north 300 miles over one hundred million years.

== Hydrography ==
The sands at Drake's Cove and the general hydrographic nature of the Pacific coast have been investigated by the Guild and its collaborators. The levels of the sea have not changed significantly since Drake's visit. The sand spit shown on the Hondius Broadside map have been evaluated and found to have a cyclical nature – which has been shown by the reappearance of the sand spit in 1952 and 2001.

== Identification of the location of Drake's Cove ==
The Guild recognizes Matthew Dillingham's photographic work on November 22, 1952 as the key break which allowed the identification of the specific Drake landing site.

== Marine expeditions ==
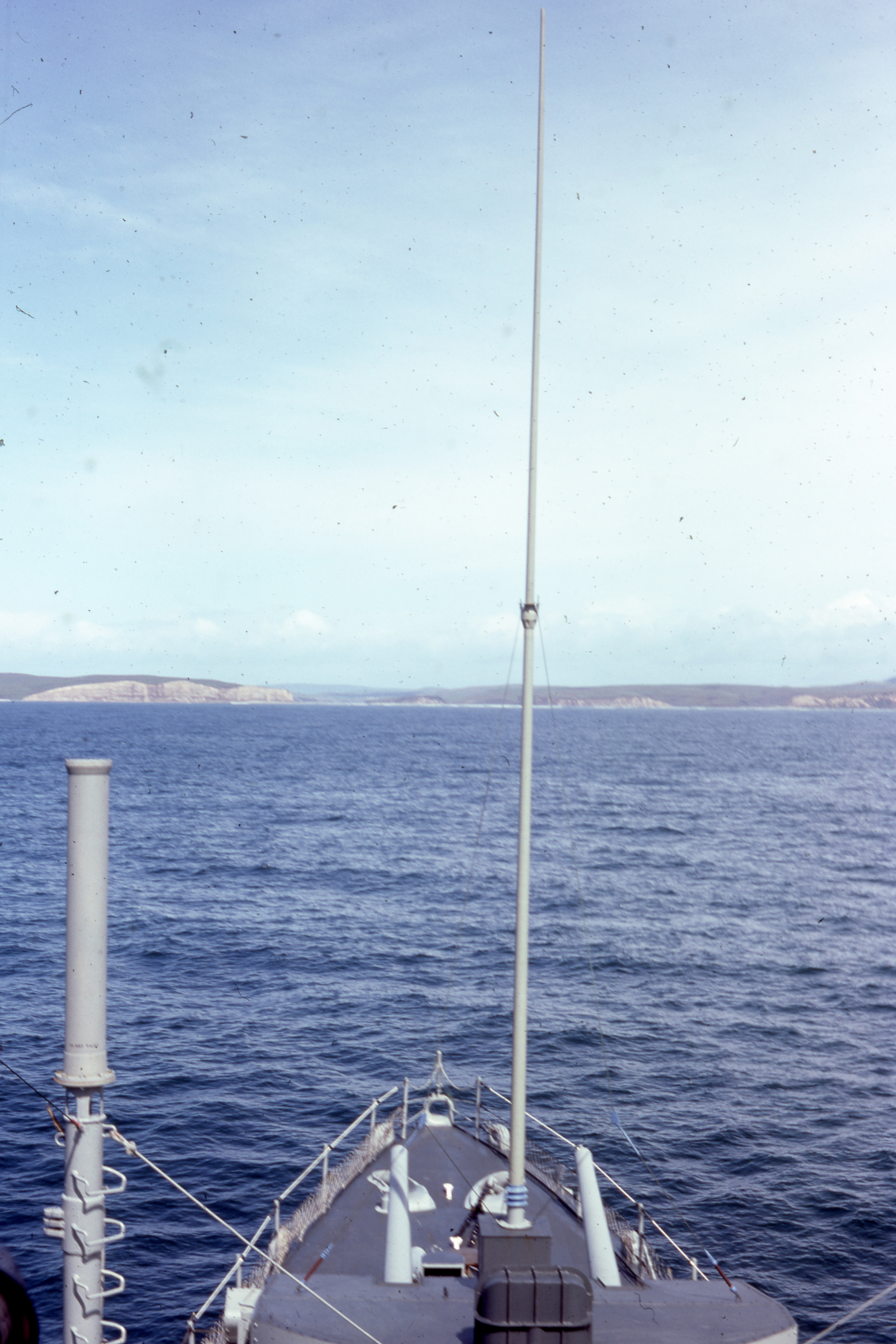
Drakes Bay's white cliffs seen from USS Wiltsie in the 1970s

The Guild has sponsored or co-sponsored several ocean studies of the Drakes Bay site. Since the discovery of Drake's landing site was by sea, it is critical to evaluate the landing site the way Drake and his crew saw it. One 1970s visit was aboard the USS Wiltsie (DD-716). The most recent expedition was co-sponsored by the Point Reyes National Seashore Association (PRNSA), Mother Lode Musical Theatre and the Guild on September 11, 2009.

== Navigation ==
Drake traveled 1,500 miles north from Guatulco, Mexico seeking the Strait of Anian. Encountering bad weather, Drake headed east, finding land at Coos Bay, Oregon on June 5, 1579. The Guild has investigated the site. It took Drake 15 days to travel the 400 miles south to Nova Albion. The Guild has evaluated the navigation of this leg of his voyage.

== Recognitions ==
Working with the English Navy and the Sir Robert Hadow, British Consul General, the Guild marked the landing site in 1954. An additional plaque was installed to honor the 400th anniversary of the landing in 1979. The Guild supported the marking of Drake's landfall in Oregon by the Oregon Historical Society and Oregon State Parks. In addition, the Guild led the work to establish the National Historic Landmark (2012) and the California Historical Landmark (#1061, 2021) which recognize the Drake's Cove landing site.

== Other investigations ==
The Guild has led or participated in the research on several other Drake-related matters including Drake's First Landfall, the Plate of Brass, "Drake's Cup," and Cermeño's 1595 wreck at Drake's Bay.

=== Drake's first landfall ===
The Guild has researched and identified Drake's North American landfall at Coos Bay, Oregon. The site was recognized as an Oregon landmark by the Oregon Historical Society and Oregon State Parks in 1977: it also recognizes that Drake later spent five weeks in California.43.304291°N 124.399177°W

=== Drake's Plate of Brass ===
Drake's Plate of Brass is described in contemporary accounts of Drake's California visit. The plate found in 1936 was accepted as authentic until 1977 when studies showed that it is a modern forgery The plate was created and planted in Marin in 1936 by members of ECV the E Clampus Vitus drinking and whimsical historical society. The letters ECV were painted on the plate's back, only visible under ultraviolet light. Wikipedia - Drake's Plate of Brass

=== “Drake’s Cup” ===
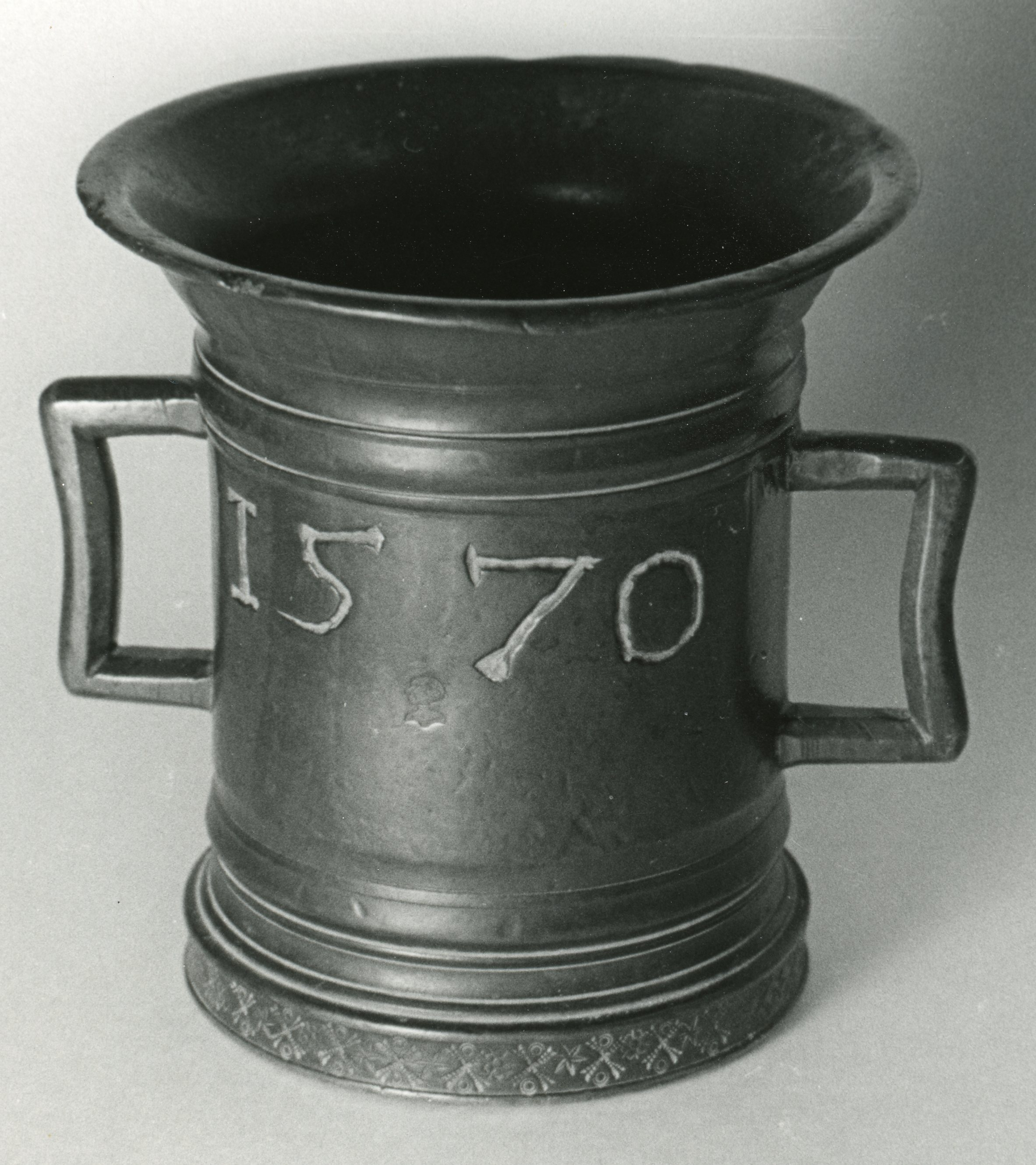
This is a bronze mortar from the Episcopal Church in Novato, California

The so-called “Drake’s Cup” is a bronze mortar with the date 1570 inscribed in it. The mortar hung in a Marin County, California church for many years and was called “Drake’s Cup” for decades. In the early 1970s, the mortar was researched extensively by the Guild. While the mortar is an authentic sixteenth century item from Nurenberg with a known moor's head maker's mark, no provenance associating it with Drake's California visit can be established.

=== Sebastian Rodriguez Cermeño ===
The Guild has also researched Sebastian Rodriguez Cermeño's anchorage and subsequent wreck in Drakes Bay in 1595. The Guild has been a cooperating group with the San Agustin Institute of Marine Archaeology.

== Collaborators ==
- F. Richard Brace
- Sir Alex A. Cumming
- Matthew P. Dillingham
- Captain Daniel Dillon, USN
- William T. Hall
- Admiral of the Fleet Lord Louis Mountbatten
- Captain Adolph S. Oko, Jr.
- Rear Admiral Samuel Eliot Morison
- Anna L. Wilson

== Other publications ==
- Von der Porten, Edward P., Our First New England, U.S. Naval Institute Proceedings, December, 1960.
- Von der Porten, Edward, The First New England, The Compass, January–February 1962

== See also ==
- Drake's Plate of Brass, a forgery of a plate purported to have been posted by Drake in California
- New Albion
- Drake in California
