= Edward Von der Porten =

American scholar (1933–2018)

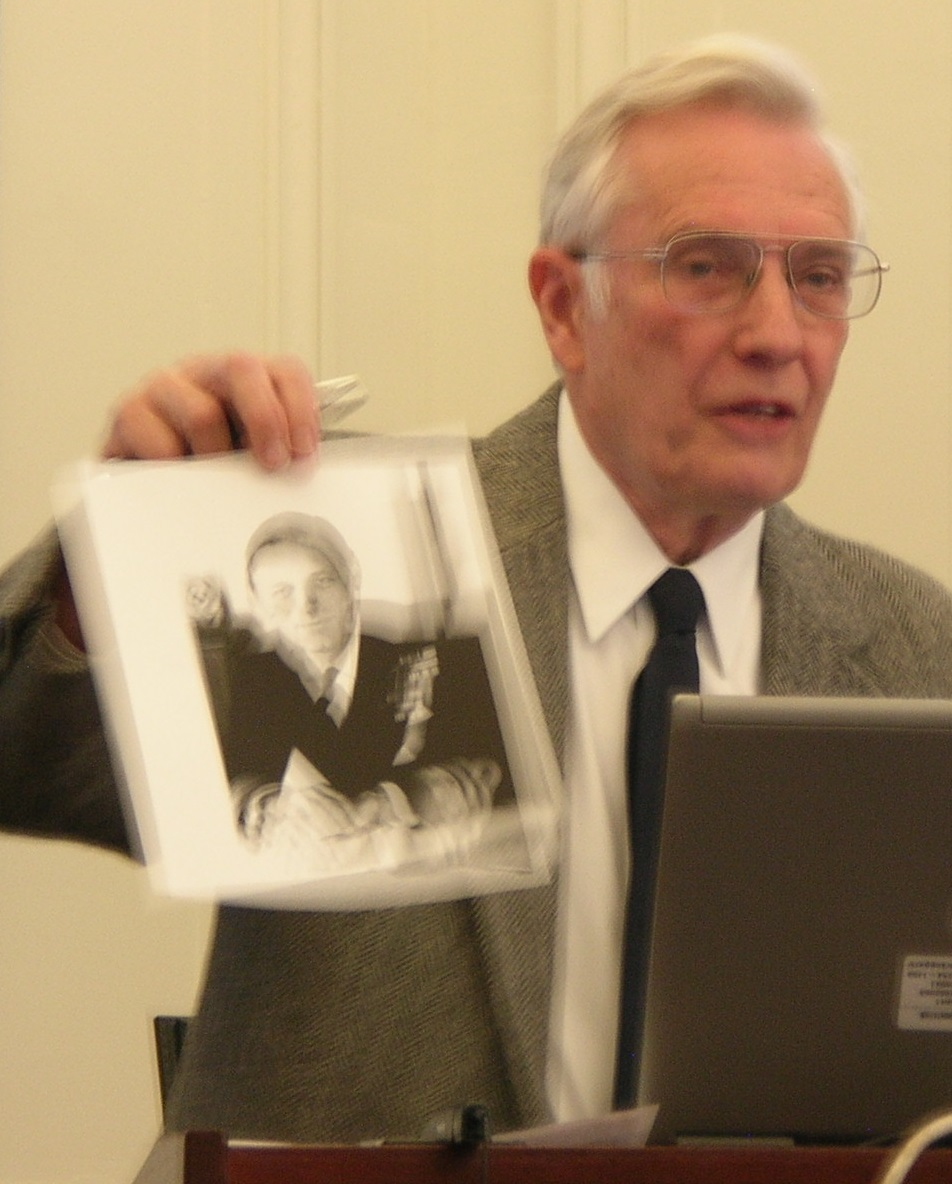
- Von der Porten in 2011
- Born: Edward Paul Von der Porten; October 29, 1933; New York City, U.S.
- Died: April 9, 2018 (aged 84); San Francisco, U.S.
- Occupations: Historian, archaeologist, school teacher
- Spouse: Saryl Corrick
- Children: Two sons
- Writing career
- Genres: History and archaeology
- Subjects: Kriegsmarine, Chinese porcelains, Manila Galleons, Francis Drake

Edward Paul Von der Porten (October 29, 1933 – April 9, 2018) was an American scholar noted for his work in history, archaeology, and museum practices. His areas of expertise included Sir Francis Drake, Drake's New Albion claim, Chinese porcelain, the Kriegsmarine, and Manila galleon history, and he was also the director of the Treasure Island Museum.

== Personal life ==
Edward Paul Von der Porten was born in New York City on October 29, 1933, and died in San Francisco on April 9, 2018, of strokes. His father was a banker, and when Von der Porten graduated from Stuyvesant High School, the family moved to San Francisco. At San Francisco State College (now San Francisco State University), he earned his Bachelor of Arts degree in 1955. While attending post-graduate school at San Francisco State, he researched the German World War II navy, the Kriegsmarine, and in 1965 was awarded a master of arts degree.

Von der Porten earned his teaching credential and first taught at Washington High School (Fremont, California). He later taught at Cook Middle School. Most of his career, he taught at Santa Rosa High School. Von der Porten also developed the program and taught archaeology at Santa Rosa Junior College (SRJC).

While in college, Von der Porten met Saryl Corrick and they were married in 1954. They had two sons.

== Career ==
Von der Porten both taught archaeology and founded the field archaeology program at SRJC. With the college, he did extensive archaeological field work regarding the protohistory of the area of what is now Point Reyes National Seashore, near Drakes Bay, California. In the fall of 1961, Von der Porten and 21 of his Santa Rosa Junior College students excavated four sites that had been previously identified by the Drake Navigators Guild (DNG). These sites were sites which he had previously investigated on behalf of—and while operating—as a member of the DNG. In 1962, he led a team of SJRC 23 students who further investigated DNG sites in Marin County and two other locations on the Sonoma Coast near the old Russian colony, Fort Ross. Later, SJRC continued the archaeology studies at Point Reyes National Seashore by including other instructors.

Maritime historian Barry Gough writes about Von der Porten: ‘’He was an American pioneer in writing the German naval history of the Second World War. . . .” For the book, Von der Porten interviewed numerous German naval officers including Großadmiral Karl Dönitz who authored and signed the book's foreword. The book, first published in 1969 was again published in an expanded pictorial edition in 1976. Von der Porten' last book, the posthumously published Ghost Galleon, describes the 16th century Manila galleon wreck off Baja California, the San Juanillo.

Von der Porten investigated 16th century maritime history at Drakes Bay and Point Reyes, particularly with respect to Chinese porcelains. Clarence Shangraw of San Francisco's Asian Art Museum and Von der Porten studied the archived porcelain sherds and distinguished two different cargoes: one from Francis Drake Golden Hind anchorage in 1579 and another from Sebastián Cermeño's 1595 San Agustin shipwreck. His work—primarily as an officer of the Drake Navigators Guild—was instrumental in the recognition as Drakes Bay becoming a National Historic Landmark acknowledging the place where Francis Drake careened his ship.

Von der Porten investigated and wrote regarding the mystery of Drake's Plate of Brass hoax. He often cautioned about the insufficient utility of the plate as an artifact by saying, "Such a lone find is nearly meaningless in the nature of archaeological evidence."

Von der Porten was the manager of the Treasure Island Museum, and he developed the museum and shop aboard the Jeremiah O’Brien Liberty Ship, currently berthed in San Francisco. He was also consulting displays curator for the Sonoma County Museum and worked with the Instituto Nacional de Antropologia e Historia in Mexico City. Among the conferences at which Von der Porten presented were those held by the Center For Scientific Research in Canada and at conferences of the Society for the History of Discoveries and The North American Society for Oceanic History. He was also a consultant for the National Geographic regarding the Hanseatic League and did significant research about Henry VIII’s Mary Rose and the development of big gun sailing ships.

== Books ==
Von der Porten wrote several books and almost 100 scholarly articles about maritime matters. This list represents some of the books he authored:

- Ghost Galleon: The Discovery and Archaeology of the San Juanillo on the Shores of Baja California. Texas A&M University Press (2019). ISBN 978-1-62349-767-5
- Write In Style. Perfection Learning; 5th edition (2012). ISBN 978-0789182968
- Discovering Francis Drake's California Harbor. Drake Navigators Guild (2000). (Co-authored with Raymond Aker) ASIN B0006RF8S6
- The Drake And Cermeño Expeditions' Chinese Porcelains At Drakes Bay, California 1579 And 1595. Santa Rosa Junior College and Drake Navigators Guild (1981). (Co-authored with Clarence Shangraw)
- Pictorial History of the German Navy in World War II . Crowell; Revised edition (1976). ISBN 978-0690010800
- The German Navy in World War II. T. Y. Crowell (1969). ASIN B0006BZ9A4
- The Mystery of the Plate of Brass: California's Greatest Hoax and The Search for its Perpetrators. Amazon (2020) ASIN 9798673403112
