= Point Reyes State Marine Reserve & Point Reyes State Marine Conservation Area =

Marine protected areas in California

Point Reyes State Marine Reserve (SMR) and Point Reyes State Marine Conservation Area (SMCA) are two adjoining marine protected areas that extend offshore of Point Reyes Headlands and within Drakes Bay in Marin County on California's north central coast. The combined area of these marine protected areas is 21.49 square miles (55.7 km^{2}), with 9.38 in the SMR, and 12.11 in the adjacent SMCA. Point Reyes SMR prohibits the take of all living marine resources. Point Reyes SMCA prohibits the take of all living marine resources, except the recreational and commercial take of Dungeness crab by pot and salmon by trolling.

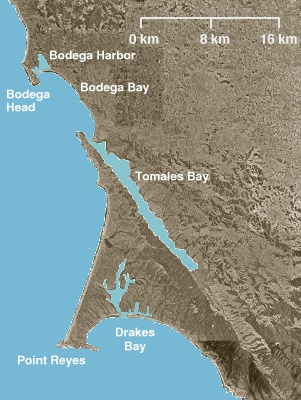

== History ==
Point Reyes SMR and Point Reyes SMCA are two of 22 marine protected areas adopted by the California Department of Fish and Game in August 2009, during the second phase of the Marine Life Protection Act Initiative. The MLPAI is a collaborative public process to create a statewide network of protected areas along California's coastline.

The north central coast's new marine protected areas were designed by local divers, fishermen, conservationists and scientists who comprised the North Central Coast Regional Stakeholder Group. Their job was to design a network of protected areas that would preserve sensitive sea life and habitats while enhancing recreation, study and education opportunities.

The north central coast marine protected areas took effect on May 1, 2010.

== Geography and natural features ==
Point Reyes SMR and Point Reyes SMCA are two adjoining marine protected areas that extend offshore of Point Reyes Headlands and within Drakes Bay in Marin County on California's north central coast. The SMR is onshore and the SMCA is offshore. Point Reyes is a spectacular and biologically diverse peninsula which has been designated a National Seashore.

Point Reyes SMR is bounded by the mean high tide line straight lines connecting the following points in the order listed:

37° 59.90'N. lat. 123° 01.29'W. long.; 37° 59.90'N. lat. 123° 02.00'W. long.; 37° 59.00'N. lat. 123° 02.00'W. long.; 37° 59.00'N. lat. 122° 57.34'W. long.; and 38° 01.75'N. lat. 122° 55.00' W. long.; thence westward along the mean high tide line onshore boundary to 38° 01.783'N. lat. 122° 55.286'W. long.; and 38° 01.954'N. lat. 122° 56.451'W. long.

Point Reyes SMCA is bounded by straight lines connecting the following points in the order listed except where noted:

37° 59.00' N. lat. 123° 02.00' W. long.; 38° 56.71' N. lat. 123° 02.00' W. long.; thence eastward along the three nautical mile offshore boundary to 37° 56.36' N. lat. 122° 57.34' W. long.; 37° 59.00' N. lat. 122° 57.34' W. long.; and 37° 59.00' N. lat. 123° 02.00' W. long.

== Habitat and wildlife ==
The Point Reyes peninsula hosts 45% of North American bird species and almost 18% of California's plant species, including 23 threatened and endangered species. At the receiving end of one of California's major upwelling zones, this coastal habitat is also home to humpback and gray whales, seals, sea lions, and elephant seals. Point Reyes SMR and Point Reyes SMCA protect multiple habitats including exposed high energy rocky shoreline, sand & gravel beaches, offshore islets, surf grass, and soft & hard substrates, and the diverse fish, seabird and marine mammals associated with them.

== Recreation and nearby attractions ==
Through a haze of salty fog, visitors can see, hear, smell and even feel the thunderous ocean breakers washing over long sandy beaches and crashing into rocky cliffs. Point Reyes National Seashore covers over 100 square miles (260 km^{2}) and includes 33,300 acres of coastal wilderness area. The undeveloped coastline stretches for 80 miles (130 km). Extensive recreational activities include hiking, biking, kayaking, camping and wildlife viewing. There are three visitor centers and extensive ranger-led programs.

Point Reyes SMR prohibits the take of all living marine resources. Point Reyes SMCA prohibits the take of all living marine resources, except the recreational and commercial take of Dungeness crab by pot and salmon by trolling. However, California's marine protected areas encourage recreational and educational uses of the ocean. Activities such as kayaking, diving, snorkeling, and swimming are allowed unless otherwise restricted.

== Scientific monitoring ==
As specified by the Marine Life Protection Act, select marine protected areas along California's central coast are being monitored by scientists to track their effectiveness and learn more about ocean health. Similar studies in marine protected areas located off of the Santa Barbara Channel Islands have already detected gradual improvements in fish size and number.
