= Drake's Plate of Brass =

Forged plaque allegedly placed by Francis Drake when landing in California in 1579

Drake's Plate of Brass

Drake's Plate of Brass is a forgery that purports to be the brass plaque that Francis Drake posted while anchored in Drake's Bay in Northern California in 1579. The hoax was successful for 40 years, despite early doubts. After the plate came to public attention in 1936, historians raised questions regarding the plate's wording, spelling, and manufacture. The hoax's perpetrators, members of the fraternal organization E Clampus Vitus, attempted to apprise the plate's finders as to its origins. Many presumed the plate to be authentic after an early metallurgical study concluded it was genuine. In the late 1970s, scientists determined that the plate was a modern creation after it failed a battery of physical and chemical tests. Much of the mystery surrounding the plate continued until 2003, when historians advanced a theory about who created the plate and why, showing the plate to be a practical joke by local historians gone awry. The plate was acquired by and is often on display at the Bancroft Library of the University of California, Berkeley.

== Historical plate ==
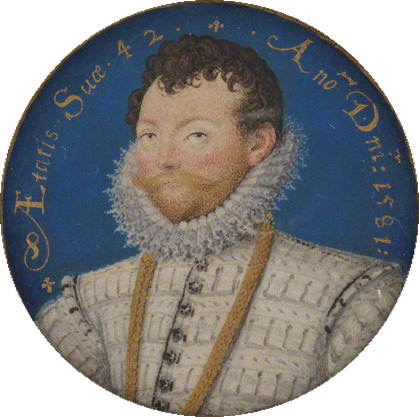
Sir Francis Drake, by Nicholas Hilliard, 1581

Drake landed at Drake's Cove in Drakes Bay, California. According to a contemporary account by Francis Fletcher, a member of Drake's party, Drake left behind "a plate" as "a monument of our being there" that claimed "her maiesties, and successors right and title to that kingdome". The memoirs also say that the plate included the date of the landing, and under it Drake's name, and the queen's portrait on a sixpence coin.

Fletcher's detailed description of the plate became the recipe for the prank that became the Drake Plate hoax.

== Hoax plate: description and text ==
The plate that came to light in the 1930s matched the description in the historical record in many ways. It was made of brass, with lettering that appeared to have been chiseled into its face. There was the hole for a sixpence coin, and the text contained all the content that Fletcher described:

BEE IT KNOWNE VNTO ALL MEN BY THESE PRESENTS.
IVNE.17.1579
BY THE GRACE OF GOD AND IN THE NAME OF HERR
MAIESTY QVEEN ELIZABETH OF ENGLAND AND HERR
SVCCESSORS FOREVER, I TAKE POSSESSION OF THIS
KINGDOME WHOSE KING AND PEOPLE FREELY RESIGNE
THEIR RIGHT AND TITLE IN THE WHOLE LAND VNTO HERR
MAIESTIEES KEEPEING. NOW NAMED BY ME AN TO BEE
KNOWNE V(N) TO ALL MEN AS NOVA ALBION.
G. FRANCIS DRAKE
(Hole for sixpence)

== Origins ==
Working for ten years, a team of four researchers pieced together a complete narrative of the out-of-hand joke. The four—Edward Von der Porten, Raymond Aker, Robert W. Allen, and James M. Spitze—published their account in California History in 2002.

=== Creation ===
According to the 2002 account, the plate was intended to be a joke among members of a playful fraternity of California history enthusiasts, the Ancient and Honorable Order of E Clampus Vitus ("ECV"). The ECV had originated during the 1849 California Gold Rush and was revived in the 1930s by Carl Wheat, George Ezra Dane, and Leon Whitsell as a fraternity of historians and Western lore enthusiasts. ECV describes itself as "dedicated to the erection of historical plaques, the protection of widows and orphans, especially the widows, and having a grand time while accomplishing these purposes." Pranks at fellow Clampers' expense were a regular part of the group's activities.

George Ezra Dane, an ECV leader, was blamed for initiating the hoax as a joke intended for fellow "Clamper" Herbert Eugene Bolton to find. The plate was likely made by George Clark in his workshop in 1917 working with Bolton's design.

The target of the hoax, Herbert Bolton, had a special interest in the plate. Bolton was a distinguished professor of California history and director of the Bancroft Library at the University of California. Over his career, he exhorted students to look for the plate—and to contact him if they ever heard of an artifact matching the historical description.

Dane initiated the plot. George Haviland Barron, a former curator of American history at the De Young Museum in San Francisco, designed the plate and bought the brass at a nearby shipyard, where a worker cut the plate from modern brass with a modern guillotine shear. George Clark, an inventor, art critic, and appraiser, hammered the letters into the plate with a simple cold chisel. Clark told his wife that the "C.G."—later taken to stand for "Captain General"—before Drake's name was essentially his own signature. As a final mark of the gag, Lorenz Noll (1891–1962) and Albert Dressler (1887–1960) painted "ECV" on the back of the plate in paint visible under ultraviolet light.

=== Discovery and loss ===
Von der Porten, Aker, and Allen surmise that the conspirators probably planted the plate in Marin in 1933, not far from the supposed location of Drake's landing. William Caldeira, a chauffeur, found the plate while his employer, Leon Bocqueraz, was hunting near the shores of Drakes Bay with a companion, Anson Stiles Blake. Bocqueraz was a banker, while Blake was a prominent and active Berkeley alumnus. Both were members of the California Historical Society.

Caldeira showed the dirt-covered plate to Bocqueraz, then stowed the plate in the car to investigate later and then forgot about it. Some weeks later, he found it while cleaning the car on the San Rafael Ferry and threw it away on the side of the road in San Rafael—several miles from its original location, but still in the Marin area. This was the first of a series of events that ultimately spun the joke out of the conspirators' control.

=== Re-discovery and publicity ===
The plate was found again, three years later, in 1936, by Beryle Shinn, a shop clerk. Shinn showed it to a friend, a Berkeley student, who suggested that he take the plate to Bolton. In February 1937, Shinn brought it to Bolton, which to Bolton was the fulfillment of a decades-old professional dream. Bolton compared it to Francis Pretty's contemporaneous description of the plate. He alerted Robert Gordon Sproul, the University of California president, and Allen L. Chickering, the president of the California Historical Society, to the possibility of a major find. Chickering and Bolton negotiated to buy the plate, offering to pay $2,500 (equivalent to $56,000 in 2025) and to assume all risk regarding the authenticity of the plate.

Then another series of events took the hoax to the next level. One day after agreeing in principle to sell the plate, Shinn took it back from Bolton, saying he wanted to show it to his uncle and then return it. Bolton and Chickering did not hear from Shinn again for four days. Apparently frightened that they might lose this major opportunity, Chickering moved to quickly buy the plate for $3,500 (equivalent to $78,400 in 2025). The plate was then given to the University's Bancroft Library.

Bolton soon announced at a California Historical Society meeting, on April 6, 1937, "One of the world's long-lost historical treasures apparently has been found!... The authenticity of the tablet seems to me beyond all reasonable doubt." Now, having only minimally investigated the plate, Bolton and Chickering had publicly committed themselves, personally and professionally, and their institutions to the authenticity of the plate.

=== Early doubts ===
Skeptics pointed out many suspicious elements of the plate. Reginald B. Haselden, a specialist in Elizabethan literature, published a critique of the plate in the September 1937 issue of California History, outlining a list of problems. The spelling seemed modern. The wording did not match normal Elizabethan forms. For example, the plate reads "Queen Elizabeth", not the standard style "Elizabeth, by the Grace of God, Queen of England, France and Ireland, Defender of the Faith". The plate contains the modern forms "the" and "this" instead of the 16th-century "ye" and "y(i)s". Physically, the plate seemed too uniform and the patina suspect. Yet none of these elements by themselves seemed to determine the matter, alternative interpretations of each being available. Haselden's points were immediately disputed. Chickering published a defense of the plate in the same issue of California Monthly.

=== Conspirators' warnings ===
The joke, originally intended as an internal Clamper affair, had quickly and suddenly broken out into the public eye. Rather than unveiling their prank at an ECV dinner among friends, revealing the hoax would now be a very public and painful proposition for all involved. As Von der Porten and others wrote, "Private confession could not be kept private, and public confession was fraught with great peril."

The conspirators found a number of ways of trying to tip off Bolton without coming forward. V. L. Vander Hoof, a fellow Clamper and Berkeley professor, made a spoof of the plate a few weeks after the announcement of the find, hoping to show Bolton that modern tools could make a plate that looked remarkably like the "real" plate. Clamper Edwin Grabhorn, a Western history publisher, published a spoof letter from the "Consolidated Brasse and Novelty Company" offering a "special line of brass plates" guaranteed to "make your home-town famous."

Finally, ECV produced a small press run of a book, Ye Preposterous Booke of Brasse, detailing problems with the metal content, wording and spelling. The book even instructed the reader to look for the "ECV" in fluorescent paint on the back and stated outright "we should now re-claim [the plate] as the rightful property of our ancient Order", meaning ECV.

Just before the Preposterous booklet was printed, fellow Clamper (and the person accused of the hoax) George Ezra Dane sent Bolton a promotional flyer soliciting preorders. Printed in the flyer was an interesting comment that may have alluded to the truth of the scheme: “As history thunders down the corridors of time, the name of E Clampus Vitus and the Francis Drake Plate will be forever joined.”

=== "Confirmation" ===
While Bolton and Chickering continued to defend the plate, doubts and rumors continued to circulate. Sproul, the University president, had become concerned as well. Bolton played down concerns while challenges to the plate’s authenticity were numerous and authoritative, as were demands for analysis of the relic. Journalists at home and abroad, as well as historians and archaeologists, sent requests for at least a good photograph of the plate. Bolton demurred, put off analysis, and did not follow up with experts on specific questions they had about the plate that could help determine its authenticity. A good photograph was not available even by August of 1937 when the editor of Antiquity wrote to Bolton “surely in the case of an object which, if genuine, is of the highest historical importance, at least one really adequate photograph should be made available!” Bolton chose Professor Colin Fink, chair of the Division of Electrochemistry of Columbia University, to authenticate the plate. While the California history community, and certainly Bolton, would have been aware of the Clampers' book of clues, Fink may not have been. In any case, in 1938 Fink and his colleague E. P. Polushkin confirmed the plate as genuine in no uncertain terms: "[I]t is our opinion that the brass plate examined by us is the genuine Drake Plate."

== Scientific investigation ==
In the early 1970s, physics caught up to Haselden's original findings. Professor James D. Hart, director of the Bancroft Library, assembled a re-testing plan in preparation for the 400th anniversary of Drake's landing. He asked the Research Laboratory for Archaeology, the History of Art at Oxford University, and the Lawrence Berkeley Laboratory for a detailed analysis. The tests included X-ray diffraction, stereo microscopy, and additional metallurgical analysis. X-ray diffraction and gamma-ray absorption tests revealed the plate to be too smooth, made by modern rolling equipment, not hammered flat by a sixteenth-century hammer. Dr. Frank Asaro, at the Lawrence Berkeley Laboratory of the University of California, Berkeley, working with colleague Helen Michels, used neutron activation analysis to study the plate and found that it contained far too much zinc and too few impurities to be Elizabethan English brass, while containing trace metals that corresponded to modern American brass. Cyril Stanley Smith of MIT examined the plate under a stereo microscope and found the edges to be consistent with modern cutting equipment.

== See also ==
- His Majesty, McDuck – a 1989 Walt Disney story fashioned after the plate discovery
- New Albion
- Drake Navigators Guild
- Oscar Hartzell – perpetrator of another hoax based on Sir Francis Drake
