= Adolph S. Oko Jr. =

American ship captain

Captain Adolph S. Oko Jr. was in 1948 the captain of the S.S. Kefalos, one of the first ships to smuggle arms to Israel during the 1948 Palestine war and, subsequently, an important vessel that rescued slightly over 7,700 Jewish refugees from the Balkans and transported them to Israel in two voyages the same year.

== Early life and education ==
Oko was born December 12, 1904, in New York to Adolph Sigmund Oko who became a celebrated biographer and Spinoza scholar associated with Hebrew Union College and Rose Susan Weisinger, an unmarried couple. The younger Oko grew up spending time with his father's and his mother's families in Cincinnati and Northern California. In the late 1910s, Oko attended the Cincinnati Academy of Art. Adept at drawing, Oko maintained a lifelong interest in fine art and antiquities, a fact that served him well when he worked in San Francisco as a salesman at S & G Gump in the 1920s, and in later years as well.

== Family life ==
In 1926, Oko married (Doris) Madge Reniff. In 1927, a son also named Adolph S. Oko, III was born. The marriage, an unhappy one, ended in divorce undertaken in 1933 and finalized in 1934. In 1933 or 1934, Oko married Gladys Zemple.

== Early career ==
At age 18, Oko went to sea, serving on at least eleven ships. During the Depression, Oko held a number of disparate jobs. In 1937, Oko's finances forced him into bankruptcy. In the ensuing years, Oko ran a public relations firm. In 1942, Oko joined the US Merchant Marine, serving on six ships on nine voyages, ending as a chief mate. On his last voyage, Oko and shipmates made a trip to the Great Wall of China where Oko was shot and captured by the Communists, and held briefly. In December 1945, Oko and business partners purchased the S.S. Amur.

In 1947, Oko and partners purchased the ex-USS Aries, then called the S. S. Adelanto with the intent of sailing the ship to Israel. When a plan to smuggle half-tracks from South America to Palestine fell through, the ship was put up for sale.

== Kefalos early history ==
The T/S Dicto was built in 1917 by Bethlehem Steel Company in San Francisco. Sold in 1929, the cargo's turbine was replaced by a triple-expansion steam engine. A sale in 1933 saw the name of the ship changed to S. S. American Cardinal. A 1936 sale resulted in the name S. S. Mallard. The ship was requisitioned by the US government in 1941 and renamed the S. S. Larranga (sometimes seen as Larraňaga). After service in World War II, the ship was placed in the reserve fleet.

In 1947, Michael P. Bonicos, a Greek immigrant, purchased the ship and named it Kefalos. Under his ownership, the cargo made a number of trips to Montevideo and to England. During these voyages, Bonicos and his brother Gerassimos, the vessel's captain, maximized profits by underpaying crews and severely neglecting the ship's conditions.

== Voyage to Israel ==
In 1948, Haganah, the main Jewish underground in Palestine, through two chief intermediaries, Elie Shalit and Rafael Recanati, in a series of complex transactions, purchased the Kefalos from its owners.

Oko traveled to Portland, Maine, where the vessel had arrived from its last trip from England, to captain the Kefalos. Finding the ship in very poor condition, he had basic repairs made. Oko brought his wife aboard as purser and nurse. Key crew members came from the Adelanto; many of whom were Spanish Republican refugees, including key officers of the Kefalos. (An admirer of the Spanish Republic, Oko showed a marked preference for hiring Spanish exiled Republican sailors. Their loyalty to Oko proved an important element in the vessel's eventual successful missions.)

The ship was taken to New York where the Todd Shipyard conducted extensive and expensive repairs.

Sailing from New York, the ship traveled to Tampico, Mexico. There, a cargo of machine guns from Hawaii via Los Angeles (where most were confiscated by U. S. authorities) and arms secured in Mexico City were loaded on the Kefalos. A cargo of sugar covered the arms.

On August 3, 1948, the shipped sailed from Tampico for Tel Aviv.

En route, the ship changed its name to the S.S. M.A. Pinzon and wood structures were built to make the ship appear more like the actual M/V Pinzon.

The ship was known as the Dromit in internal Israeli communications.

The ship survived several dangers en route, but managed to arrive at Tel Aviv on September 8, 1948.

During the day, 1,020 tons of sugar were slowly unloaded. At night, 784 tons of arms were expeditiously unloaded.

The Kefalos sailed from Israel on September 12, 1948.

== Rescue missions ==
The Kefalos traveled to Naples where modifications to carry passengers in near-slave-ship conditions took much of September and October 1948.

On November 8, 1948, the Kefalos left Naples and headed to Bakar where 4,300 refugees from Eastern Europe had arrived in boxcars. Five marriages and three births were recorded among the passengers. There were no deaths or serious injuries among the passengers. On November 23, the ship arrived in Haifa.

Oko also captained a second refugee trip in which 3,800 refugees were safely delivered to Haifa. The Kefalos arrived at Bakar on December 8, 1948, but had to wait until December 15 for all the refugees to arrive. The ship arrived in Haifa on December 25.

== Ship's final days ==
Apparently, fallout from Oko's concerns at Naples and in the refugee operations led to his dismissal by Israeli officials on January 5, 1949.

The ship entered the Israeli merchant fleet and was renamed Dromit. It was retired from service on March 6, 1962, and was scrapped in 1963.

== Later life ==
Oko resided in Point Reyes Station, California where he conducted a real estate business. Oko was president of the Drake Navigators Guild and promoted research on Drake's landing in California. Oko almost single-handedly rehabilitated the Inverness Yacht Club.

== Death ==
Oko died in 1963 of a heart attack at the age of 58. Gladys Oko remarried and moved to Massachusetts where she, too, died of a heart attack in 1977.
