= Raymond Aker =

American historian (1920–2003)

- Born: March 10, 1920; Yonkers, New York, U.S.
- Died: January 4, 2003 (aged 82)
- Education: California Nautical School
- Occupation: Historian

Raymond Aker (March 10, 1920 – January 4, 2003) was a U.S. historian who was noted as an authority on the voyages of Francis Drake in the late 16th century. Aker served as president of the Drake Navigators Guild in California, which promotes Drake and his explorations. It was the work of Aker that helped ensure that Drake received credit for the discovery of Cape Horn, at the southern tip of South America.

== Biography ==
Aker was born in Yonkers, New York and grew up in Atherton, California. He was interested in sailing from an early age, and developed a hobby of making models and paintings of ships. He continued this hobby throughout his life, making detailed drawings and models of ships.

At age nineteen in 1939, he enrolled in the California Nautical School. After the attack on Pearl Harbor, his class was graduated early in 1942 class. Aker become a deck officer on troop transport ships with Matson Lines. After World War II, he worked for 29 years at Westinghouse on projects that include the Polaris missile and ship propeller design.

He also continued to develop his skills as a navigator and mariner. He developed a fascination with Drake and used his own nautical skills to reconstruct Drake's 1577–1580 circumnavigation of the globe, during which Drake landed on the west coast of North America and founded a temporary colony of New Albion at a still undetermined spot, possibly in Northern California. Like many in the Drake Navigators Guild, Aker was a proponent of the theory that Drake landed at what is now called Drakes Bay in Marin County, California, north of San Francisco. To support his theory, Aker spent many years analyzing the variation in the tides in the cove called Drakes Estero. Critics of the Drakes Estero theory have maintained that the geography of the cove does not match the descriptions in the journals of those on the voyage, or the map made from voyage accounts by Jodocus Hondius. Aker maintained that the cove geography was cyclic over decades, and in 2001 he correctly predicted the reemergence of a spit in the cove which he claimed closely matched the contemporary accounts of Drake's landing spot. He led a longtime effort to lobby the National Park Service to designate Drakes Bay as a National Historic Landmark. That effort came to fruition in 2012 with the establishment of the Drakes Bay Historic and Archaeological District National Historic Landmark.

As part of his study of Drake's circumnavigation, Aker became convinced that Drake was the true discoverer of Cape Horn, rather than Dutch explorer Willem Schouten, who was thought to have discovered it in 1616. Most historians at the time believed that Drake landed on Henderson Island northwest of Cape Horn. In 1997 the American National Maritime Historical Society accepted Aker's argument that it Drake who first discovered Cape Horn. The argument was also accepted by the National Geographic Society.

Aker also became convinced that the partial remains of Drake's ship the Golden Hinde, are buried at the old Deptford Navy Yard along the Thames in east London.
