= Drakes Bay =

Bay on the coast of California, U.S.

- Drakes Bay Historic Archaeological District
- U.S. National Register of Historic Places
- U.S. National Historic Landmark District
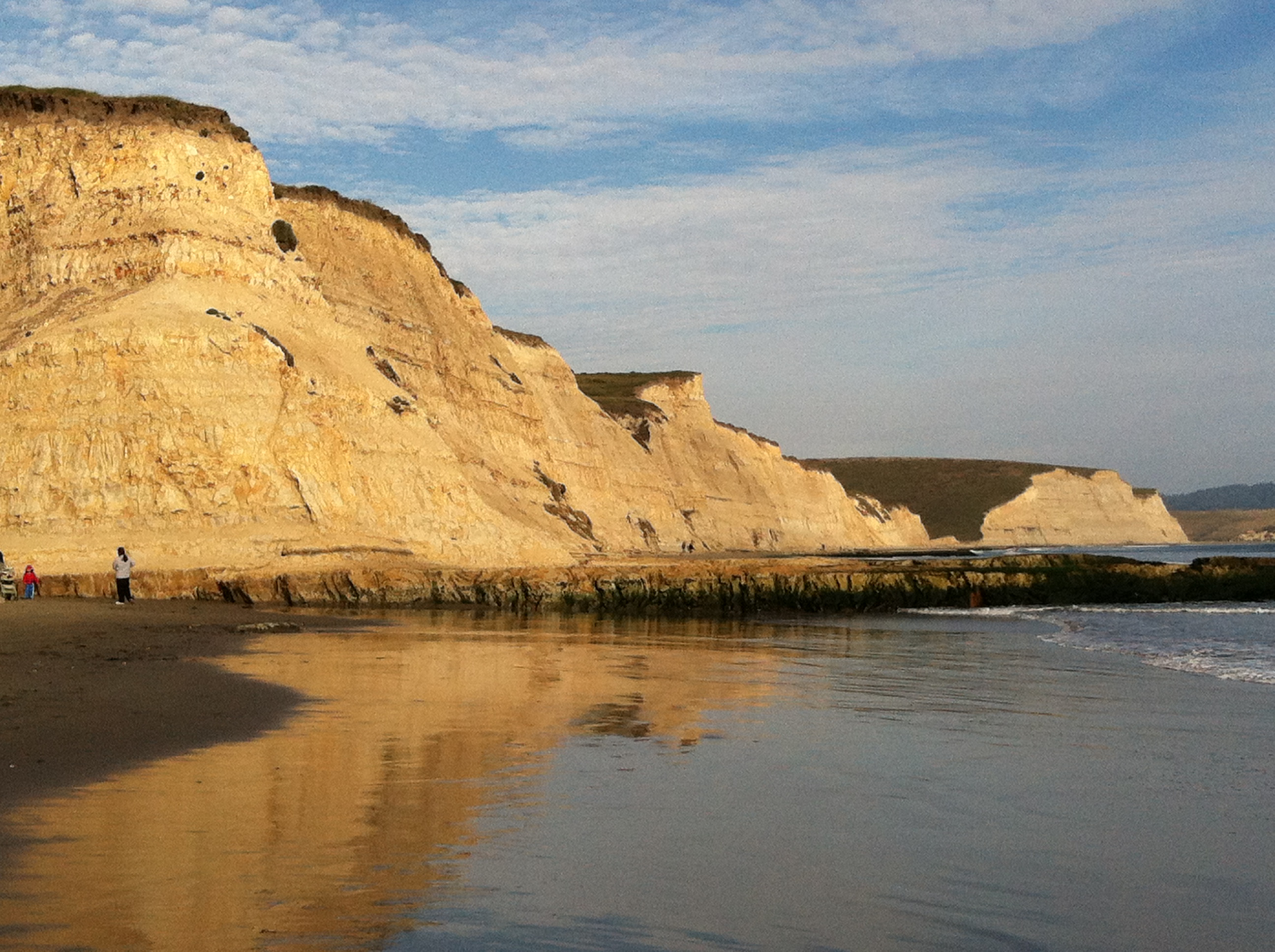
- 2013 view

- Location within California Location within the United States
- Coordinates: 38°0′43″N 122°55′9″W
- NRHP reference No.: 12001006

Significant dates
- Added to NRHP: October 10, 2012
- Designated NHLD: October 10, 2012

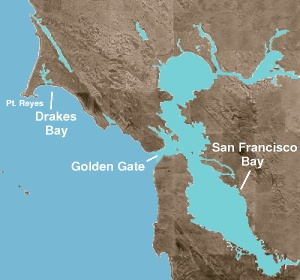
Drakes Bay

Drakes Bay (Coast Miwok: Tamál-Húye) is an 8-mile-wide (13 km) bay along the Point Reyes National Seashore on the coast of northern California in the United States, approximately 30 mi (50 km) northwest of San Francisco at approximately 38 degrees north latitude. It is formed on the lee side of the coastal current by Point Reyes. An alternative name for this bay is Puerto De Los Reyes.

== Naming ==
The bay was named by English-born American surveyor George Davidson in 1875, after Sir Francis Drake. It has long been considered Drake's most likely landing spot on the west coast of North America during his circumnavigation of the world by sea in 1579.

== Description ==
The bay is fed by Drake's Estero, an expansive estuary on the Point Reyes peninsula. The estuary is protected by Estero de Limantour State Marine Reserve & Drakes Estero State Marine Conservation Area. Point Reyes State Marine Reserve & Point Reyes State Marine Conservation Area lie within Drakes Bay. Like underwater parks, these marine protected areas help conserve ocean wildlife and marine ecosystems.

== History ==
A portion of the coastal area of Drakes Bay is archaeologically and historically important. It is believed to be the site of Francis Drake's 1579 landfall (which he called New Albion), and also the location where a Spanish Manila galleon sank during a storm in 1595. Both Drake and the Portuguese commander of the galleon, Sebastião Rodrigues Soromenho, interacted with the local Coast Miwok.

There are 15 archaeological sites on the bay of Miwok settlements where European trade goods have been found, including materials that the Miwok probably recovered from the wrecked galleon. The region was designated a National Historic Landmark District on October 17, 2012.

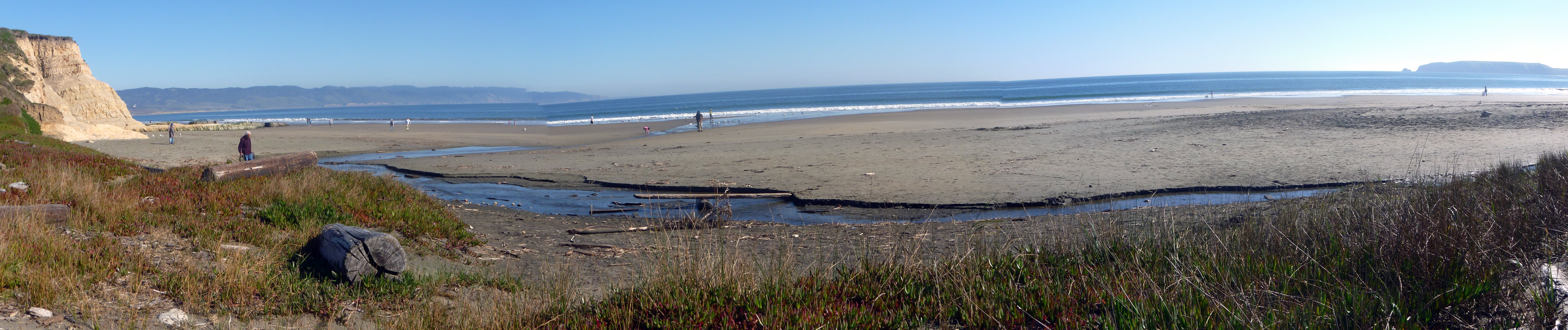
View of Drakes Bay from Drake's beach
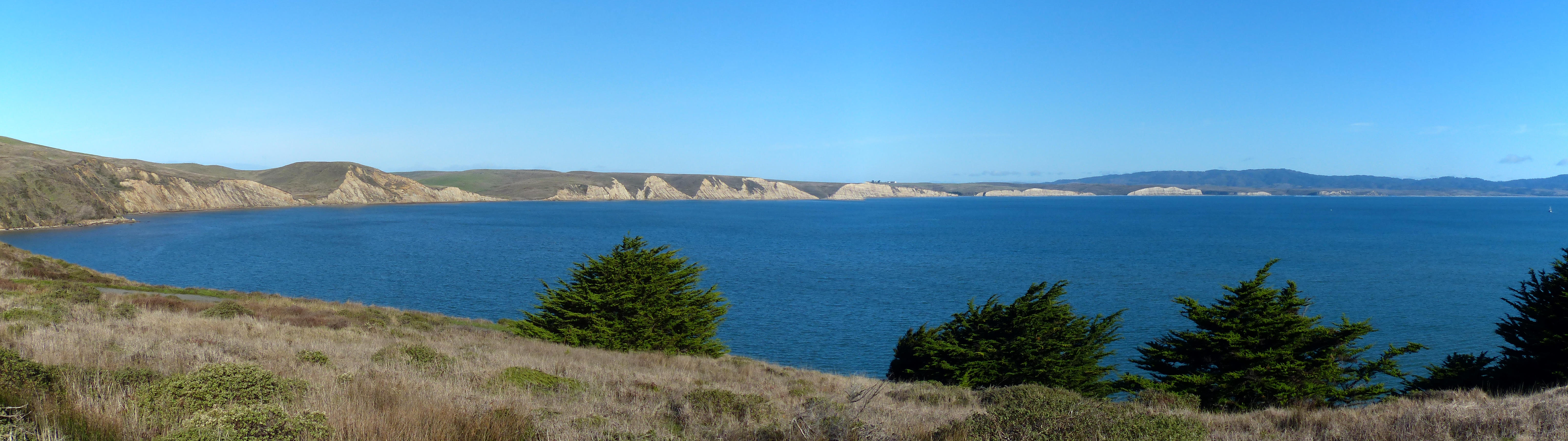
View of Drakes Bay from Elephant Seal Overlook trail

== See also ==
- Tomales Bay
- Drake's Plate of Brass
- Camp Hydle
- List of National Historic Landmarks in California
