= Johann Theodor de Bry =

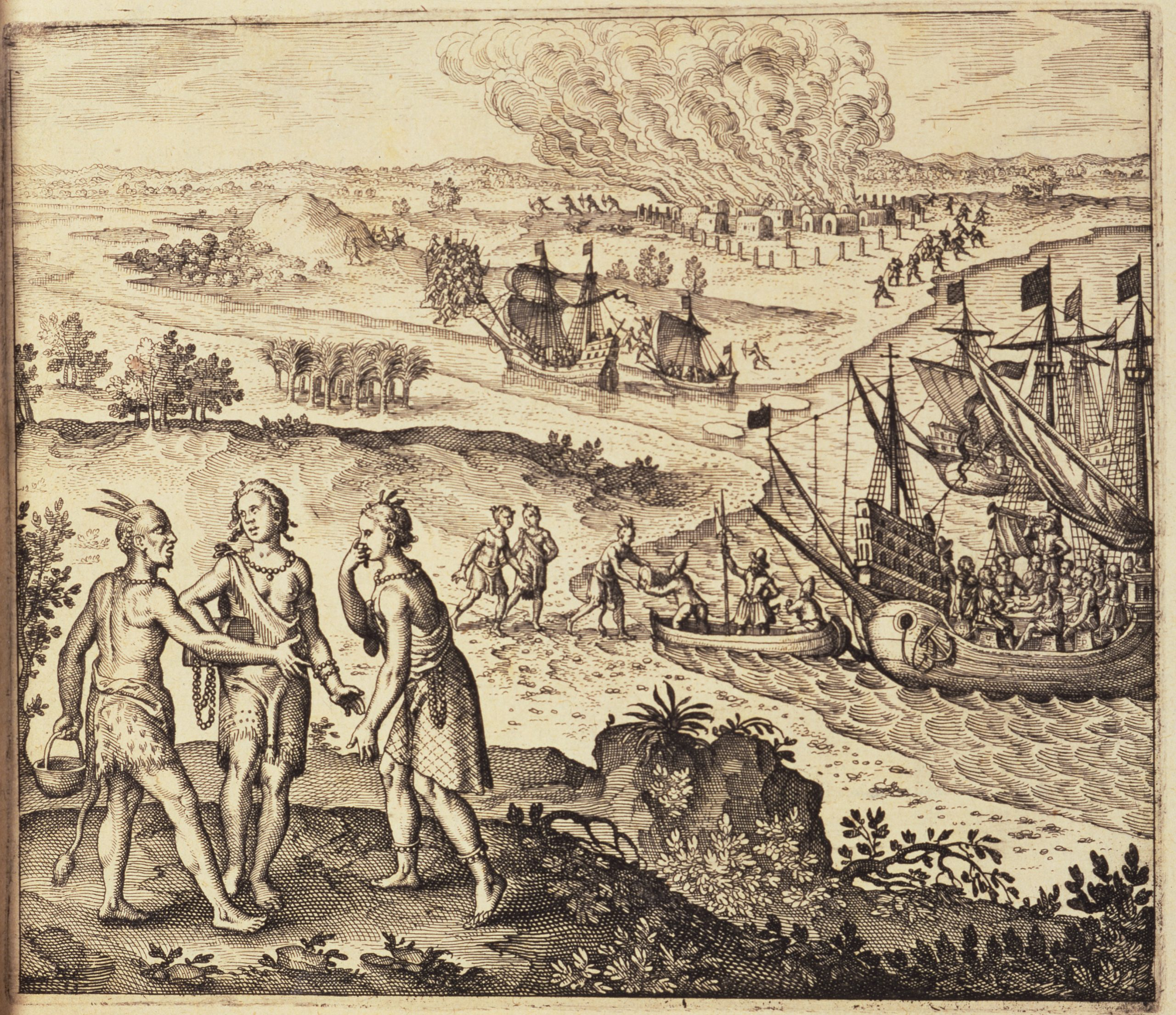
The Abduction of Pocahontas, 1624, after Georg Keller

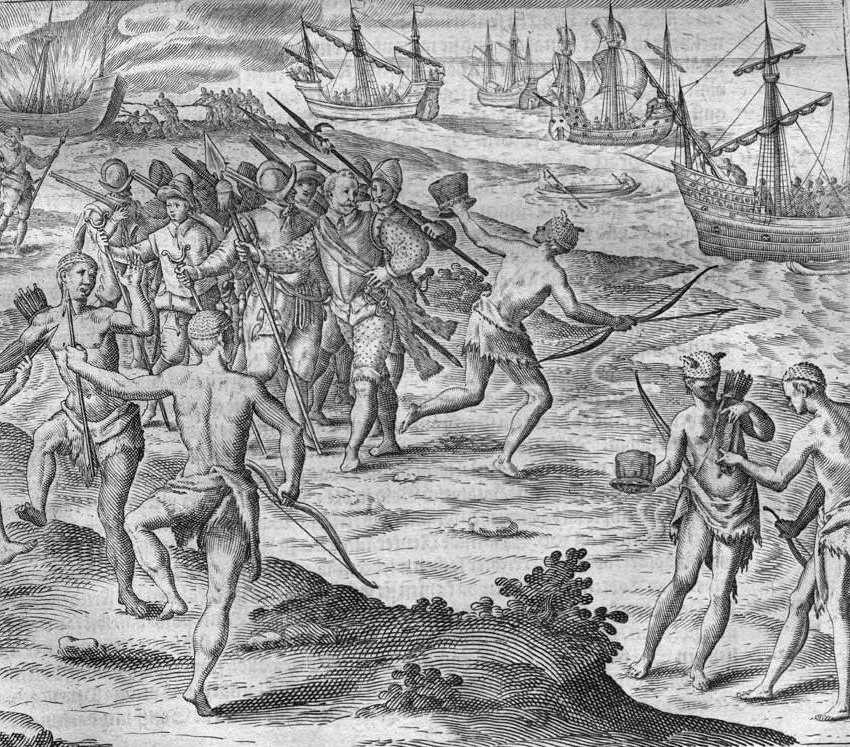
Francis Drake at the Rio de la Plata

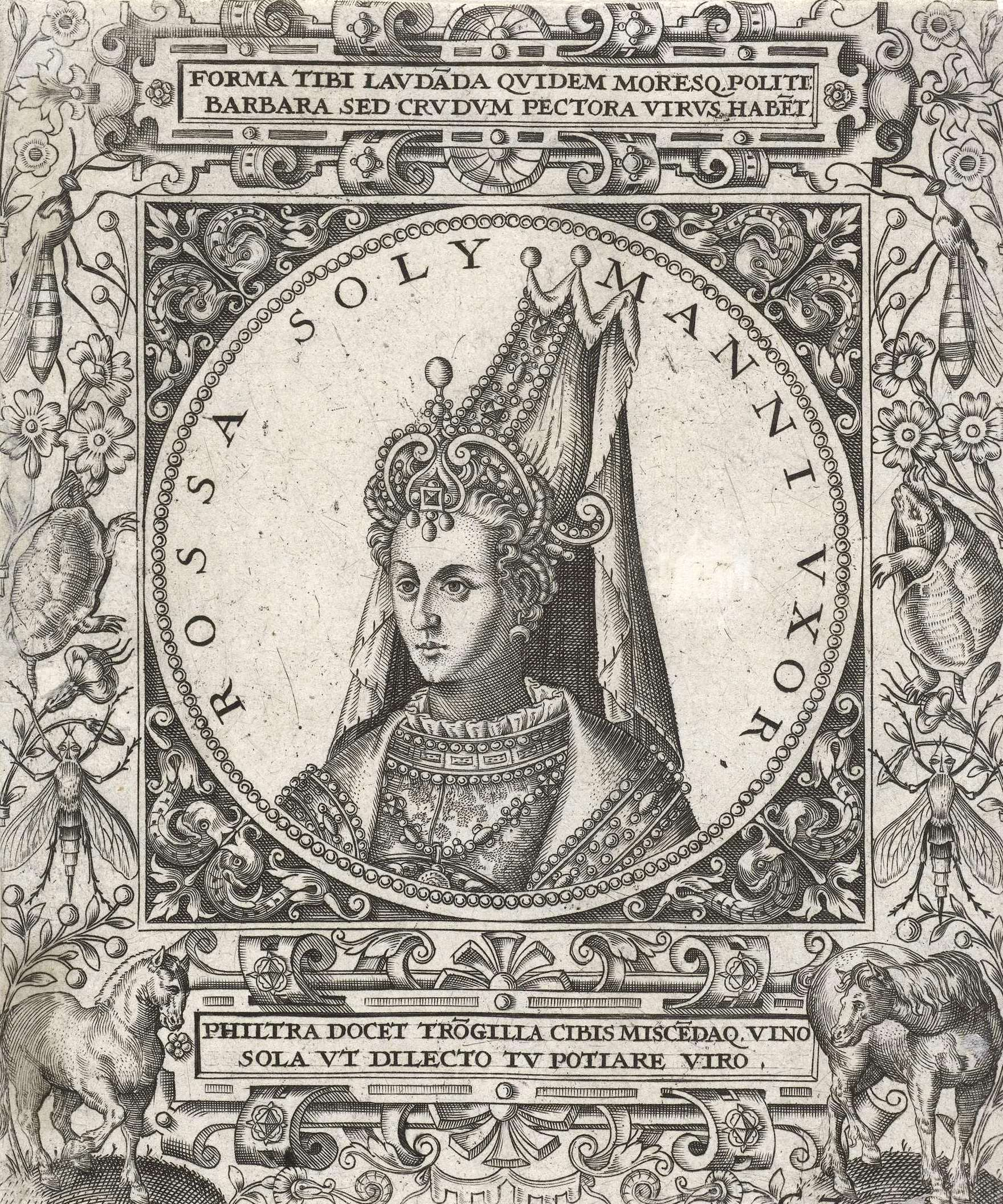
Portrait of Haseki Hürrem Sultan

Johann Theodor de Bry (1561 – 31 January 1623) was an engraver and publisher.

== Biography ==
De Bry was born in Strasbourg, the elder son and pupil of Dirk de Bry. He greatly assisted his father in works such as, the Florilegium novum, which was published at Frankfort in 1612, and, with the assistance of his brother Johannes Israel, he completed the two volumes of Boissard's 'Romanae urbis Topographia et Antiquitates,' which were left unfinished at his father's death. He also published 'Emblemata secularia,' 1596, and added considerably to the collection of Portraits of Illustrious Persons, begun by his father. His pupil was Frederik van Hulsen. He died at Frankfort in 1623. His prints are signed with the initials J. T. B. or a monogram.

He also made the following prints:

- Portrait of Gerard Mercator, geographer.
- Portrait of Daniel Specklin.
- Four plates of the Elements; J. T. de Bry, inv. et fec.
- The Marriage of Rebekah; after Baldassare Peruzzi.
- A March of Soldiers; a frieze; after Titian.
- Another March of Soldiers, conducting Prisoners, with Death riding on a Horse; a frieze, called the Triumph of Death; after the same.
- The Little Village Fair; after H. S. Beham.
- The Fountain of Youth; after the same.
- The Triumph of Bacchus; after Giulio Romano.
- The Venetian Ball; after Theodore Bernard; a circular plate.
- The Golden Age; from the print engraved by N. De Bruyn; after A. Bloemaert.

After his father's death in 1598, Johann Theodore took over the family's printing house. Sometimes before 1613, he moved the enterprise from Frankfurt to Oppenheim, where the firm published important works by the English Paracelcist physician Robert Fludd, and the Bohemian Michael Maier (also a follower of Paracelsus) who had served as physician to Emperor Rudolph II. Many of the works printed by De Bry also featured engravings by his son-in-law Matthäus Merian, for example A Hundred Ethico-Political Emblems by Julius Gulielmus Zincgreff (1619) which is dedicated to and celebrates the Elector Palatine Frederick V (Oppenheim's ruler). Historian Frances Yates suggests the De Bry publishing house had close ties to the Elector's court at Heidelberg given that it printed works by supporters of Frederick and the short-lived attempt to have him installed as King of Bohemia. She also points out the important role it played in publishing works (such as those by Fludd and Maier) in defense of the Fraternity of Rosicrucians. After the capture of Oppenheim in 1620, De Bry moved the printing house back to Frankfurt.
