= Golden Hind =

Ship captained by Francis Drake

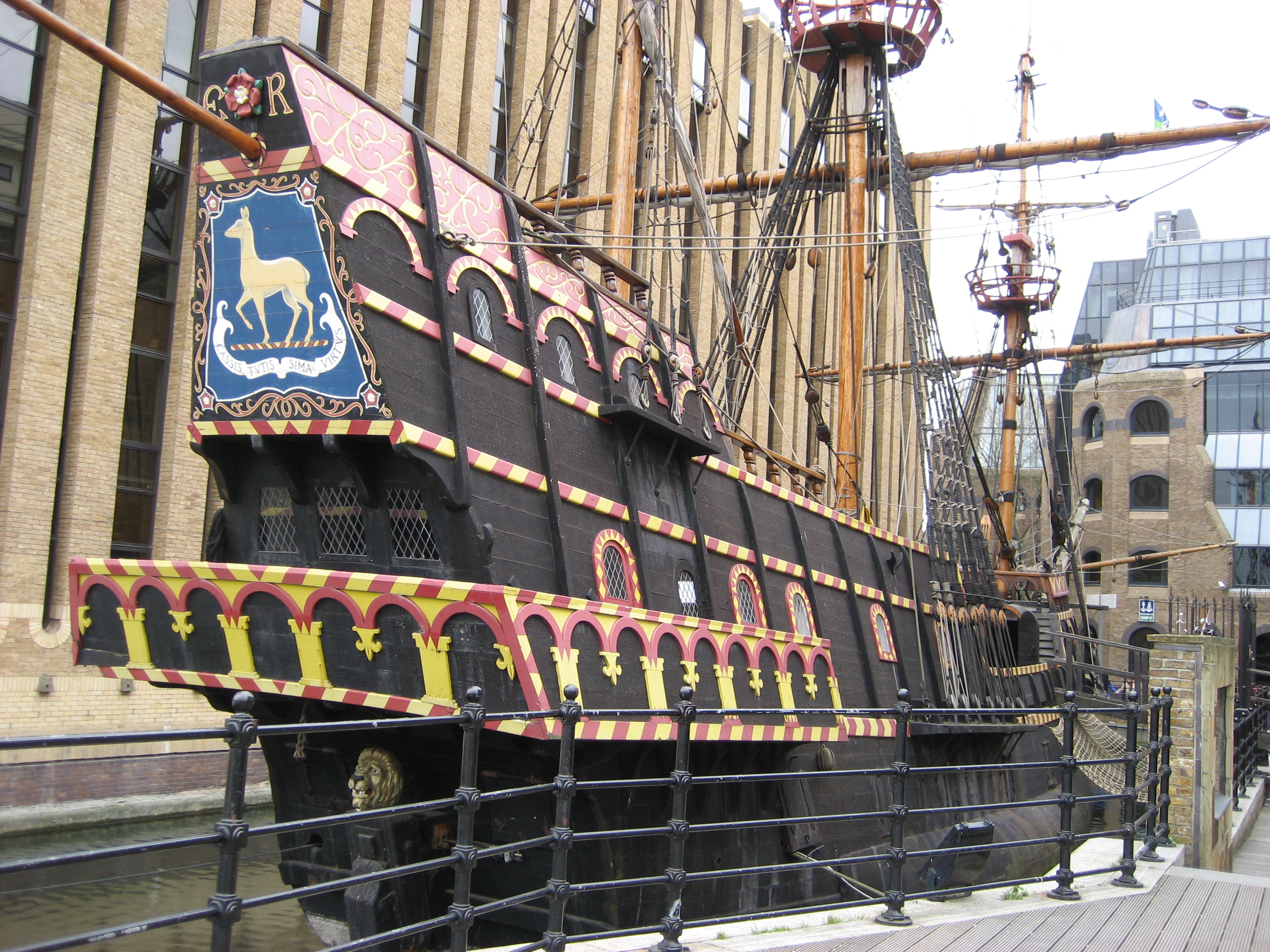
- Golden Hinde, a sea-worthy reconstruction of the original vessel

History

England
- Name: Pelican
- Launched: 1577
- Sponsored by: Queen Elizabeth I of England
- Renamed: Golden Hind(e) (1578)
- Fate: Disintegrated and broken up in c. late-17th century; two replicas exist

General characteristics
- Type: Galleon
- Tonnage: 100–150 tons
- Displacement: 300 tons
- Length: 102 ft (31 m) on deck
- Beam: 20 ft (6.1 m)
- Draught: 9 ft (2.7 m)
- Propulsion: Sail; Wind
- Speed: 8 knots (15 km/h)
- Complement: 80–85
- Armament: 22 guns
- Armour: None
- Notes: Sail area: 386 m²

Golden Hind was a galleon captained by Francis Drake in his circumnavigation of the world between 1577 and 1580. She was originally known as Pelican, but Drake renamed her mid-voyage in 1578, in honour of his patron, Sir Christopher Hatton, whose crest was a golden hind (a female red deer). Hatton was one of the principal sponsors of Drake's world voyage. A full-sized, seaworthy reconstruction is in London, on the south bank of the Thames.

== History ==
Queen Elizabeth I partly sponsored Sir Francis Drake as the leader of an expedition intended to pass around South America through the Strait of Magellan and to explore the coast that lay beyond. The queen's support was advantageous; Drake had official approval to benefit himself and the queen and cause the maximum damage to the Spaniards. This eventually culminated in the Anglo–Spanish War. Before setting sail, Drake met the queen face-to-face for the first time and she said to him, "We would gladly be revenged on the King of Spain for divers injuries that we have received."

The explicit object was to "find out places meet to have traffic." Drake, however, acted as a privateer, with unofficial support from Elizabeth. The design of the Golden Hind was based on the Spanish built nao Victoria, the first ship to circumnavigate the world, and is described as a "mid-16th-century warship during the transition from the carrack to the galleon," and measured about 120 tons. He first named his flagship Pelican, but renamed her Golden Hind on 20 August 1578 to honour his patron, Sir Christopher Hatton, whose family crest was a golden hind. He set sail in December 1577 with five small ships with a complement of 164 and reached the Brazilian coast in early 1578.

On 1 March 1579, now in the Pacific Ocean, off the coast of Ecuador, Golden Hind challenged and captured the Spanish galleon Nuestra Señora de la Concepción. This galleon had the largest treasure captured to that date: over 360,000 pesos (equivalent to around £480 million in 2017). The treasure took six days to transship and included 26 tons of silver, half a ton of gold, porcelain, jewellery, coins and jewels.

On 26 September 1580, Francis Drake sailed his ship into Plymouth Harbour with 56 of the original crew of 80 left aboard. The ship was unloaded at Trematon Castle nearby, supervised by the Queen's guards. The final treasure also included six tons of cloves from the Spice Islands, at the time worth their weight in gold. Elizabeth herself went aboard Golden Hind, which was then permanently at Deptford on the south bank of the Thames, where she had requested it be placed on permanent display as the first museum ship. There, she shrewdly asked the French ambassador to bestow a knighthood on Drake. Over half of the proceeds went to the crown — her share of the treasure came to at least £160,000: "enough to pay off her entire government debt and still have £40,000 left over to invest in a new trading company for the Levant. Her return, and that of other investors, was more than £47 for every £1 invested, or 4,700%."

After Drake's circumnavigation, Golden Hind was maintained for public exhibition at the dockyard at Deptford, London. The ship remained there from 1580 to around 1650, 45 years after Elizabeth had died, before the ship eventually rotted away and was broken up. In 1668, the keeper of the stores at Deptford, John Davies of Camberwell, had the best remaining timber of Golden Hind made into a chair now called the Drake Chair which was presented to the Bodleian Library at the University of Oxford, where it remains (with a replica in the Great Hall, Buckland Abbey, Devon, Drake's home and now maintained by the National Trust).

A table, known as the cupboard, in the Middle Temple Hall, London is also reputed to have been made from the wood of Golden Hind. Upon the cupboard is placed the roll of members of Middle Temple, which new members sign when they are called to the Bar. The ship's lantern was hung in the vestibule of Middle Temple Hall, but was destroyed during the Second World War.

== Replicas ==
=== Essex ===
A replica of Golden Hind was constructed at Peter Pan's Playground (now Adventure Island adventure park), Southend-on-Sea, Essex. It was constructed in 1947 and opened in 1949 together with a waxworks. By 1992, attendances had dropped, and combined with rising maintenance costs with the need for a major renovation to the wooden structure caused its closure in 1997. The ship was replaced by a replica of Blackbeard's Queen Anne's Revenge, which was demolished in 2013.

=== Devon ===
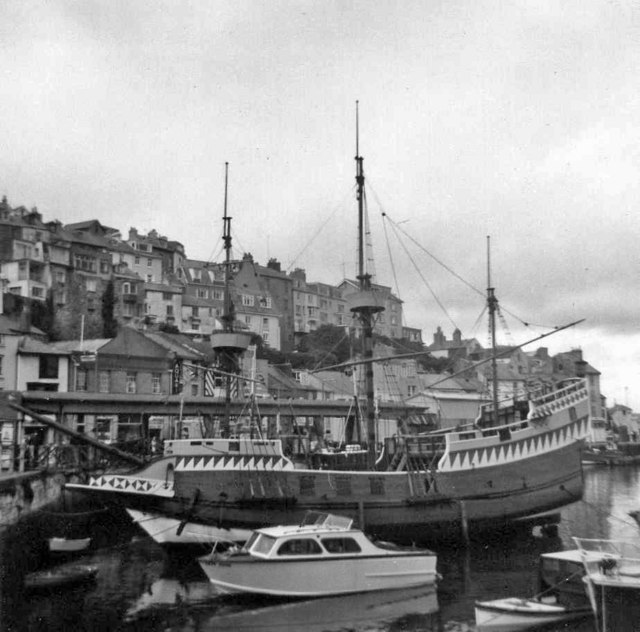
The first replica in Brixham, 1968

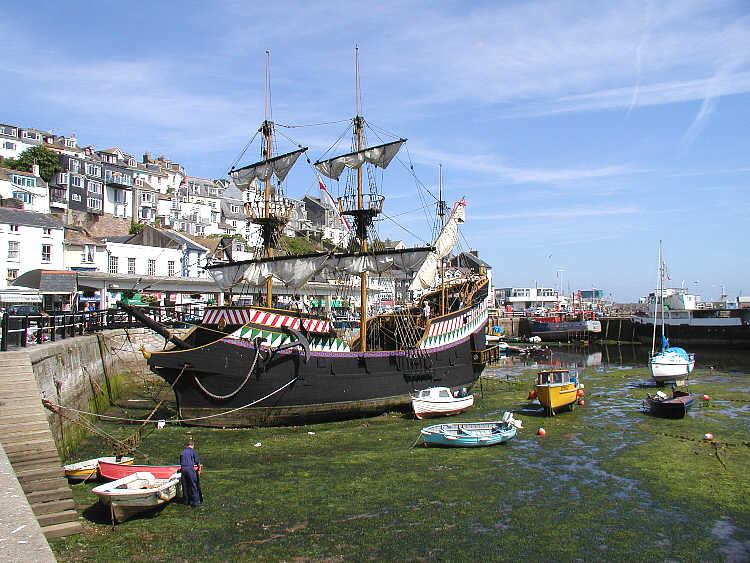
The second replica in Brixham, 2003

A replica of Golden Hind has been permanently moored in the harbour of the sea port of Brixham in Devon (GB-TOB 50°23′48″N 3°30′46″W) since 1963 following its use in the TV series Sir Francis Drake, which was filmed in and around the bays of Torbay and Dartmouth. The replica ship used in the TV series cost the film studio £25,000 to construct. It had no rear gallery or gun deck and was a converted fishing boat. The ship sank in heavy seas whilst under tow in 1987 to Dartmouth for restoration and could not be saved. A second replica was completed in 1988 and stands in the harbour being visited by thousands of visitors annually. The current vessel based on a steel barge is not full size and could never sail.

=== London ===
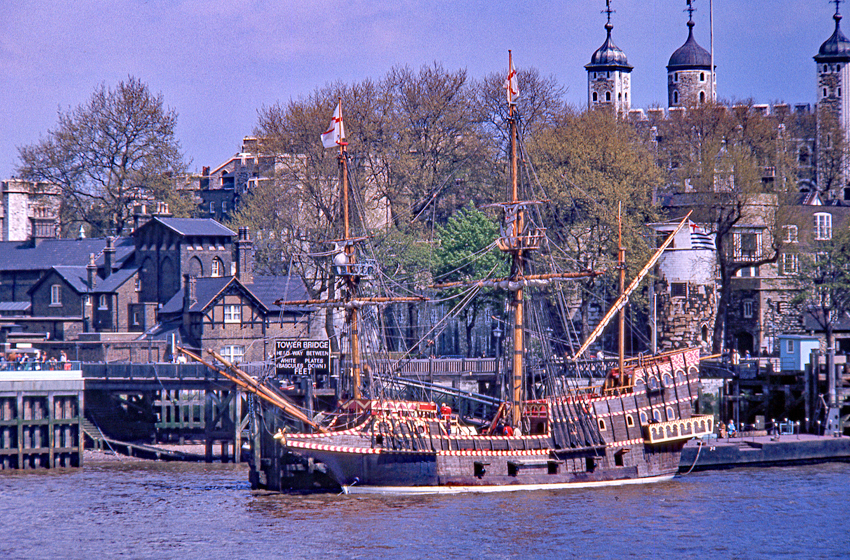
Golden Hinde replica moored at Tower Pier in 1974, before her transatlantic voyage.

Golden Hinde, a full-size reconstruction of the ship, was built by traditional methods in Appledore, Devon, and launched in 1973. Golden Hinde was the result of three years research and construction. Since then, she has travelled more than 140,000 miles (230,000 km). She sailed from Plymouth on her maiden voyage in late 1974, arriving on 9 March 1975 in San Francisco. In 1979, she sailed to Japan to make the miniseries Shōgun, after which she returned to the UK having completed a circumnavigation. Between 1981 and 1984, she was berthed in England and was established as an educational museum. In 1984–85, she sailed around the British Isles and then crossed the Atlantic to St Thomas in the Caribbean. In 1986, she passed through the Panama Canal to sail on to Vancouver, where she was the main attraction in the Marine Plaza at Expo86. In 1987, she began a tour of US coastal cities, spending two years on the Pacific coast. In late 1988, she passed back through the Panama Canal to continue port visits on the Gulf and east coasts of the US. In 1992, she returned home to the UK and spent the next four years visiting ports in Europe. Since 1996, she has been berthed at St Mary Overie Dock, in Bankside, Southwark, London, where she is open to the public and hosts a range of educational programmes.

== See also ==
- Ceryneian Hind, sometimes known as the Golden Hind
- Halfpenny (British pre-decimal coin), which featured a depiction of Golden Hind from 1937 to 1967
- University of Plymouth Coat of Arms
