= Golden Hinde (1973) =

1973 replica of the 16th century galleon

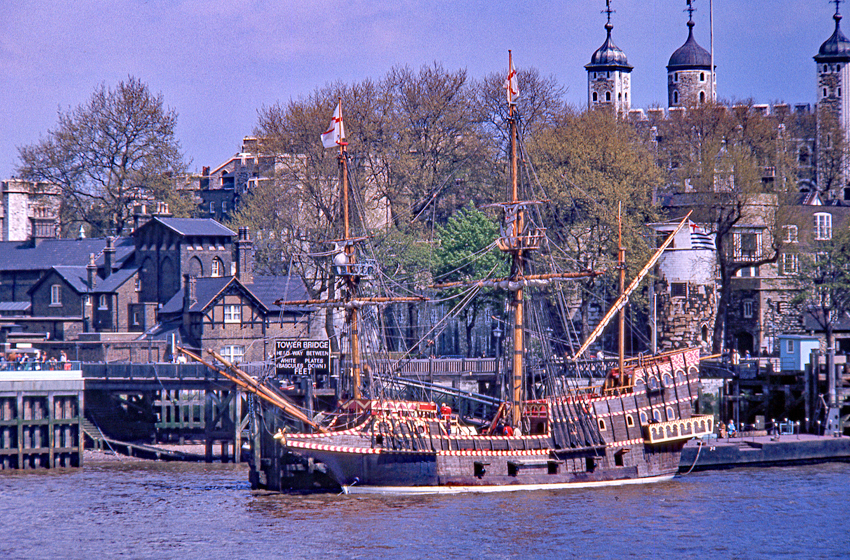
- Golden Hinde moored upriver from the Tower of London in 1974
- Location: St Mary Overie's Dock, Cathedral St, London, United Kingdom
- Coordinates: 51.5069418°N 0.0930708°W
- Website: www.goldenhinde.co.uk

Golden Hinde was launched in 1973 and is a full-size replica of the Golden Hind (launched 1577). She was built using traditional methods at Appledore, in Devon. She has travelled more than 140,000 mi (230,000 km), a distance equal to more than five times around the globe. Like the original ship, she has circumnavigated the globe.

== Construction ==
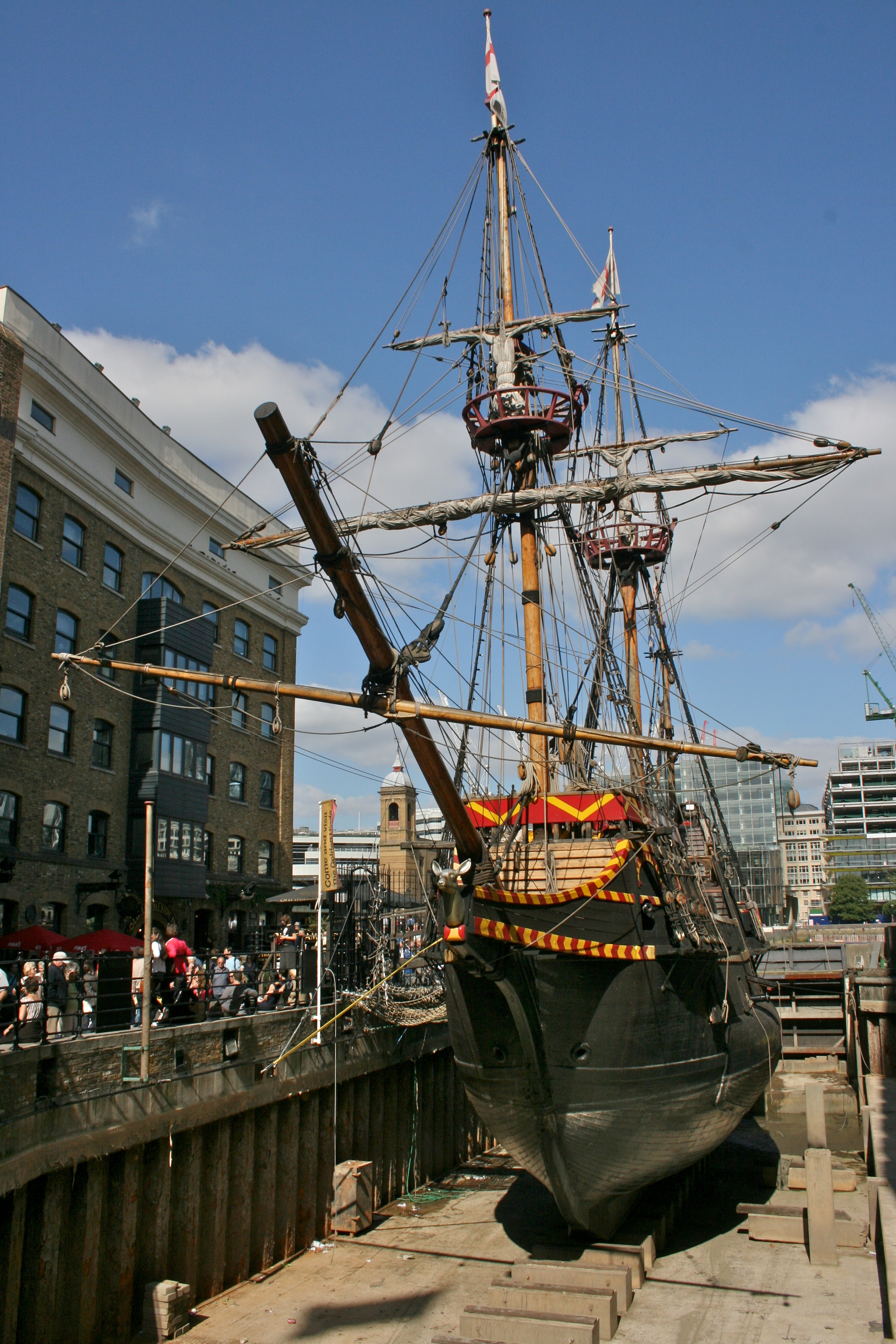
Front view, cramped in between tall buildings in a dry dock on the River Thames

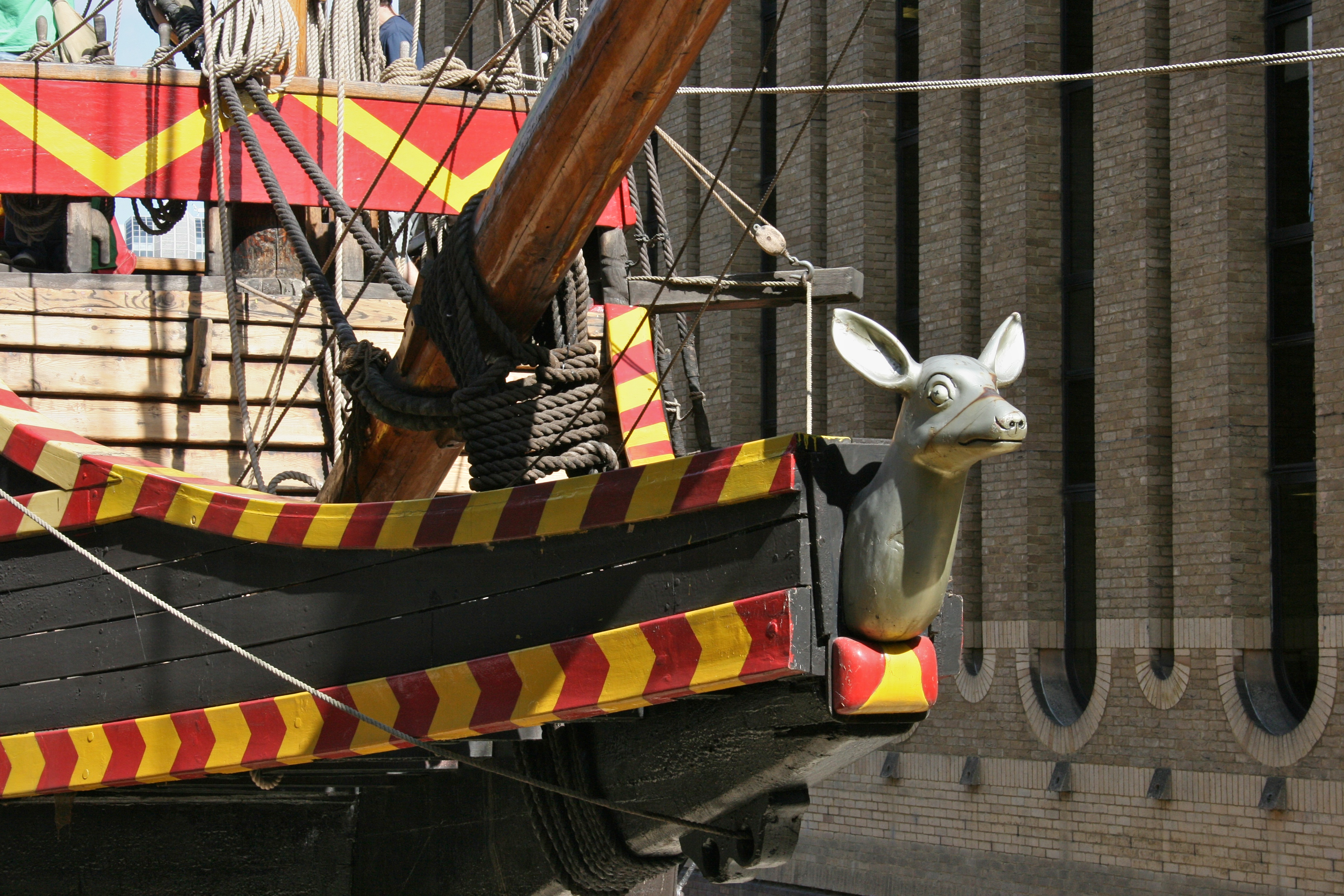
The figurehead

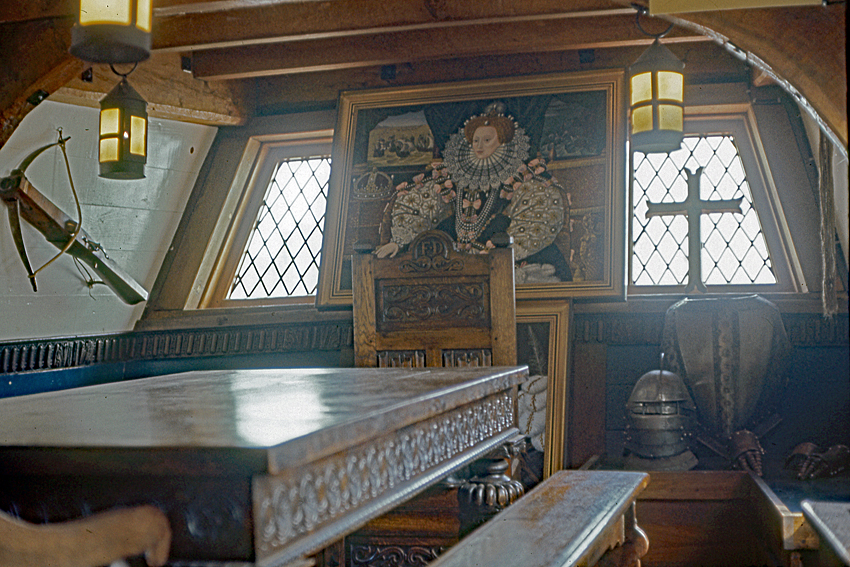
Great cabin with a reproduction of the Armada Portrait

Golden Hinde was commissioned for $500,000, in 1968, by San Franciscans, press agent Arthur Andrew Blum (and Vice-President of San Francisco Convention and Visitors Bureau), and Albert Douglas Elledge, president of the Harbor Tug and Barge Company and Thomas Bannon Crowley, Jr. of Crowley Maritime tugboats and Red & White Fleet harbour-tour line, designed by naval architect and marine engineer Loring Christian (Chris) Norgaard and built by J Hinks & Son of Appledore, Torridge. The keel was laid on 30 September 1971 and construction took two years. She was launched on 5 April 1973 by Diana, Countess of Devon.

== Specifications ==
Sources:

- Masts: 3
  - Sails 6, 5 square sails and lateen
- Hull: Iroko planking on oak frames with an elm keel.
- Hull dimensions:
  - Length:
    - Overall: 121 ft 4 in (37.0 m)
    - Hull: 102 ft (31.1 m)
    - Waterline: 75 ft 1 in (22.89 m)
  - Breadth: 22 ft (6.7 m)
  - Draft (max): 14 ft (4.3 m)
  - Displacement: 290 long tons (290 t)
- Beam: 22 ft 11 in (6.99 m)
- Height of mainmast: 92 feet (28 m)
- Sail area: 4,150 square feet (386 m^{2})
- Speed (sail): 8 knots (15 km/h)
- Steering: Drake used a pole attached to the rudder called a "whipstaff". For safety, a conventional wheel is used in the replica.
- Capstan: used for hauling up the anchor, located in the armoury and gun deck
- Crew complement: 80–85
- Armaments: 22 guns
  - 2 peteras (small guns) on the poop deck
  - 2 peteras on the foredeck
  - 2 falcons (long-range guns using two pound shot) in the forecastle
  - 2 falcons in the stern
  - 14 minions (guns using four pound shot) on the gun deck
- Load: ca. 100–150 tons (100–150 tonnes)
- Maximum crew complement: 95

== Voyages ==
Golden Hinde sailed from Plymouth on her maiden voyage in late 1974, arriving on 8 May 1975 in San Francisco, to commemorate Sir Francis Drake's claiming of New Albion, recognised as Drake's Cove near Point Reyes in California. Having completed the filming of the TV series Shogun the vessel lay moored in Taura Harbour, Yokohama for over six months. Starting in late 1979 she was sailed back to England via Hong Kong, Singapore, then across the Indian Ocean and through the Red Sea and Mediterranean in time to join the celebrations commemorating the 400th anniversary of Drake's triumphant return to England. Between 1981 and 1984, she was berthed in England and was established as an educational museum, but in 1984–1985 she sailed around the British Isles and then crossed the Atlantic to the Caribbean. In 1986, she passed through the Panama Canal to sail on to British Columbia for the World's Fair in Vancouver. In 1987, she began a tour of the US Pacific coast, visiting ports in the states of Washington, Oregon, and California. In 1988, she passed back through the Panama Canal to visit Texas. In 1989, she visited ports on the Gulf of Mexico. In 1990–1991 she entered a series of seaports on the east coast of the US, in 1992 returning home to tour the British Isles again.

== Use in films ==
Golden Hinde has been featured in four films: Swashbuckler (1976), Shogun (1980), Drake's Venture (1980) and St Trinian's 2: The Legend of Fritton's Gold (2009). She also appeared briefly in the first episode of the TV series Shaka Zulu (1986).

== Use as a museum ==
Since 1996 she has been berthed at St Mary Overie Dock on Cathedral Street, in Bankside, Southwark, London, between Southwark Cathedral and Clink Street (51°30′25″N 0°5′25″W). She hosts visits from schools in which children can dress up as Tudor sailors and receive living history lessons about Elizabethan maritime history.

== See Also ==
- Appledore Shipbuilders

== Sources ==
- Otmar Schäuffelen (trad. Casay SERVAIS), Chapman, Great sailing ships of the world, Hearst Books (New York), 2002, 420 p. (ISBN 1588163849).
- Lynch, Timothy G. (May 2012). Beyond the Golden Gate : a maritime history of California : the San Francisco Maritime National Historical Park historic resources study. National Park Service, Prepared Under Cooperative Agreement with Organization of American Historians – via archive.org.
