= Friedrich van Hulsen =

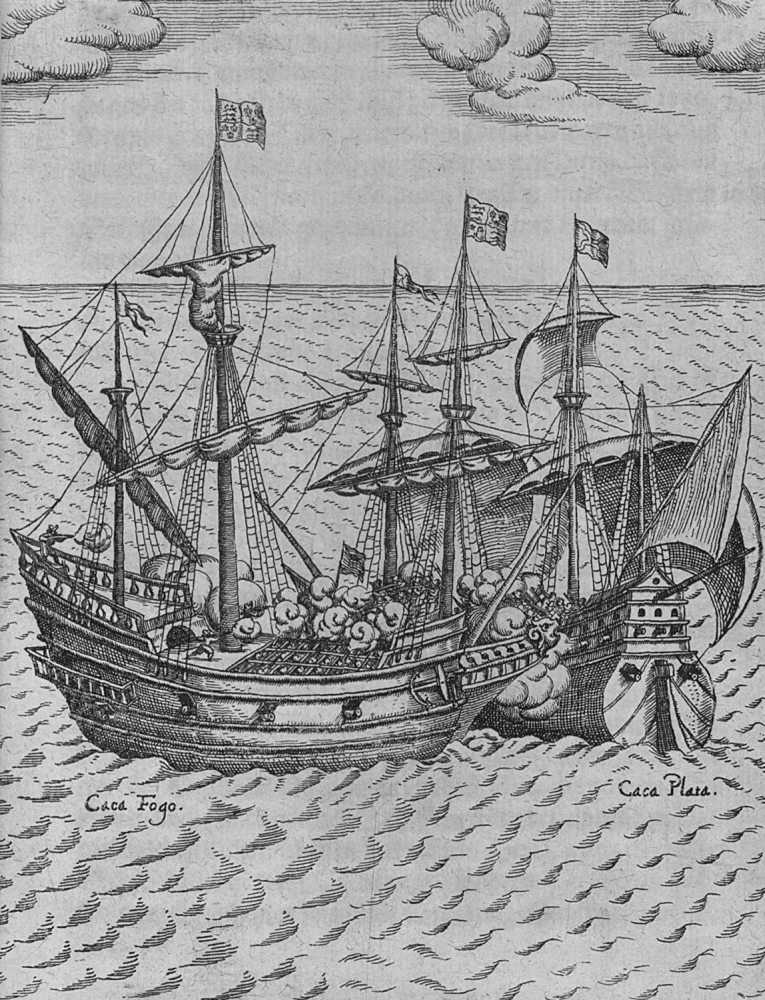
Capture Of Cacafuego (1626) engraving by Friedrich Hulsius

Frederik van Hulsen, or Friedrich von Hulsen, also known as Hulseen and Fredericus Hulsius (1580 – 1665) was a Dutch Golden Age printmaker active in Frankfurt and Nuremberg.

He was born in Middelburg and became a pupil of Jan Theodor de Bry and was known for line engravings. He died in Frankfurt.
