= Elizabeth Island (Cape Horn) =

Phantom island in the South Atlantic

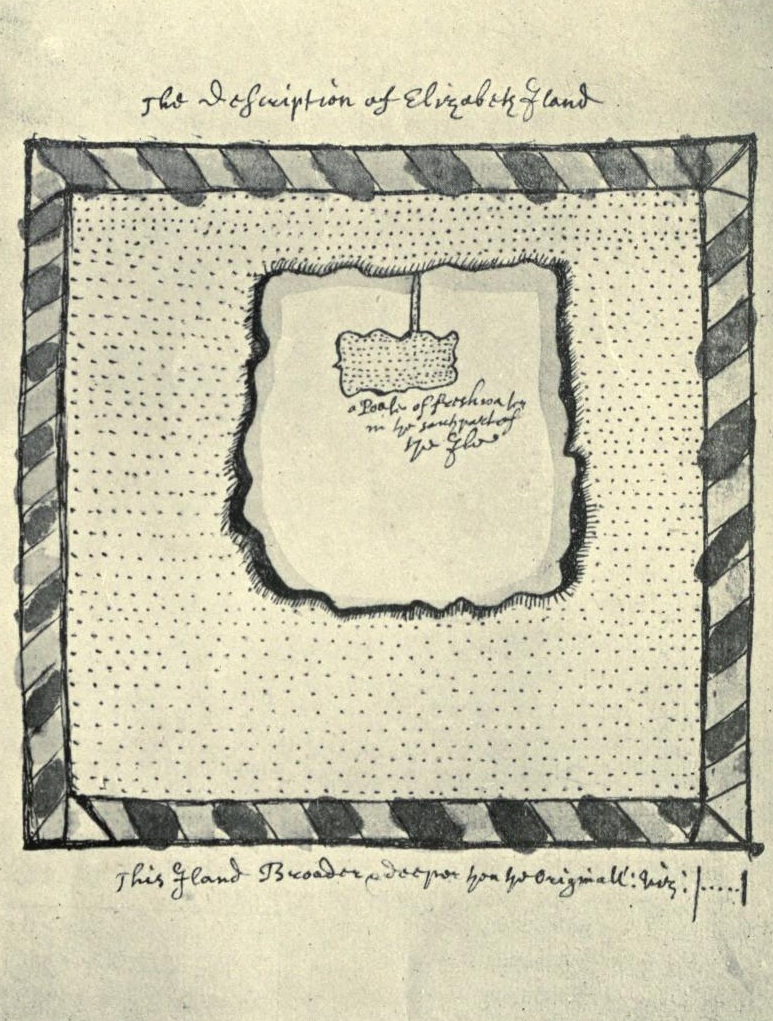
Francis Fletcher's map of Elizabeth Island

Elizabeth Island is the name given to an island off the tip of South America visited by Sir Francis Drake in September 1578, during his circumnavigation of the globe. The island was not seen again and is regarded as a phantom. Various suggestions have been offered as to where Drake landed.

== Background ==
In 1578 Drake, with a small flotilla, was seeking to enter the Pacific to attack Spanish trade there. In August 1578, he arrived at the Straits of Magellan. By September he had found his way through and entered the Pacific Ocean, only to be blown south in a series of storms. Parted from his consorts, Drake and his ship, Pelican, were at latitude 57°S (from Nuno da Silva; according to Richard Hakluyt "57 and a terce", i.e. 57°20') when, on 28 October, they encountered an island, and found shelter in a haven on its eastern shore. Drake remained for three or four days, gathering wood and water, and "herbes of grete virtue", before setting out for the coast of South America.

== Description ==
The island was described by Francis Fletcher (the expedition's chaplain) who left sketches and a map, and by da Silva, the navigator. From this, marine historian Felix Riesenberg produced a composite: an island 30 miles from north to south, almost square, without a peak, with a lake at its centre; he hypothesised that it was the crater of an extinct volcano. He surmised a high shore, or cliff, on its southern shore, and a haven on the east. This place, named on later maps as Port Sir Francis Drake, was a sheltered harbour, with a depth of 20 fathoms and "a cannon shot" (about a mile) to the shore. Fletcher also reported finding "plenty of the small berry which we named currants", and that he had left a memorial to Queen Elizabeth I with the date and year of their visit.

In a later account by Richard Hawkins, Drake reported that he had made his way to the southernmost point of the island, and, stretching out over the edge, was able to claim that he had been "more further south than ... any man as yet known".

== Fate ==
Elizabeth Island, and Port Sir Francis Drake, appeared on maps as late as that of Emanuel Bowen in 1747, but neither place was visited or seen again. Because of this, later writers have contended that Drake actually landed at Cape Horn, from an account of the voyage – The World Encompassed – by Drake's nephew in 1628. However, Riesenberg points out that Horn Island lacks wood, or fresh water, or a safe haven, or any other feature that Drake described, and offered an alternative suggestion. He notes that the position of the island is that of the Pactolus Bank, a seamount rising to within 70 fathoms (130 metres) of the surface, and suggests that the bank is the remnant of the island, disappeared in some volcanic eruption, or erosion by icebergs. The bank was discovered in 1885 by Capt. WD Burnham of the American ship Pactolus, but more recent surveys have been unable to find the bank either, suggesting that it too may be a phantom island. However historian Mateo Martinic considers Sars Bank, 350 km south of Diego Ramírez Islands, as a better fit for Elizabeth Island.

Another Elizabeth Island in the Straits of Magellan was named and claimed for England by Drake on 24 August 1578. Further confusing the issue, the entire Tierra del Fuego archipelago was called the Elizabethides or Elizabeth Islands.

Elizabeth Island would be significant as one of the first English territorial claims in the New World, preceding Drake's claim of New Albion in 1579 and Humphrey Gilbert's claim of Newfoundland in 1583. Only Martin Frobisher's claims in Baffin Island (1576) and Greenland were earlier.
