= Elizabeth Island =

Elizabeth Island may refer to:

- Elizabeth Island (Alaska)
- Elizabeth Island, Bahamas
- Elizabeth Island, Bermuda
- Elizabeth Island (Danube)
- Elizabeth Island, Michigan
- Elizabeth Island, New Zealand
- Elizabeth Island (Victoria)
- Elizabeth Island (Cape Horn), possibly the same as Pactolus Bank
- A small cay rising above sea level at Elizabeth Reef in the Coral Sea Islands, Australia
- An early alternative name for Henderson Island (Pitcairn Islands)

Or may refer to the Elizabeth Islands chain in Massachusetts, USA
