= Pactolus Bank =

Unconfirmed undersea bank in the southern Pacific Ocean

Pactolus Bank (or Burnham Bank) is (or was) a seamount in the Southern Ocean, west of Cape Horn. It was discovered by Captain W.D. Burnham of the American ship Pactolus on November 6, 1885. The bank has been proposed as a possible location for Elizabeth Island, a phantom island reported by Sir Francis Drake in October 1578. However, subsequent surveys have been unable to locate the bank, which may itself be a phantom.

== Discovery ==
Burnham reported to the US Hydrographic Office that "while running before a gale off Cape Horn in command of the American ship Pactolus at 4 o'clock in the morning of 6 November 1885, the wind lulled and the sea fell, and noticing very highly discoloured water, he hove the ship to and sounded three times, obtaining each time from 67 to 70 fms. of black sand and small rocks". He then "ran South for 30 miles before the water, which all the time was very thick and yellow, resumed its natural colour". He reports "the line of demarcation was very distinct". Burnham gives the position of the soundings as 56°36′S 74°20′W. He states that an English ship from San Francisco to Liverpool reported discoloured water in the same location at the same time.

Marine historian Felix Riesenberg notes that earlier mariners had observed large icebergs stationary in the area, suggesting they had grounded on the bank; these have typically been 200 ft or more in height, with a corresponding depth of 800 to 1,400 ft below the surface; others could have been several miles in length and up to 1000 ft high, while an iceberg sighted by a Captain CC Dixon in 1860 was L-shaped, 50 miles long on one leg, and 30 miles on the other. These icebergs have been observed stationary for up to a month in the vicinity of the bank, and are thought to be responsible for the loss of several ships that have run into them, or been trapped.

== Significance ==
Felix Riesenberg, who served under Burnham, postulated that Pactolus Bank was the sunken location of Elizabeth Island, discovered by Sir Francis Drake's ship the Golden Hinde in 1578. Leaving the Magellan Strait, Drake's ship was driven far to the west and south, before clawing its way back towards land. On 22 October the ship anchored off an island which Drake, according to Riesenberg, named "Elizabeth Island", where wood and water was collected and seals and penguins captured for food, along with "herbs of great virtue". According to Drake's Portuguese pilot, Nuno da Silva, their position at the anchorage was 57°S. However, no island has been confirmed at that latitude, although a sinking volcanic island may have been sighted in that vicinity by the Danish ship Lutterfeld in December 1876 or 1877.

Historian Mateo Martinic, however, considers Sars Bank, 350 km south of Diego Ramírez Islands, as a better fit for Elizabeth Island.

== Fate ==
The USS Bear (AG-29) investigated the area in March 1940, but her log does not mention any soundings or results. The USS Wyandot (AKA-92) investigated the area in 1956 and found no indication of a shoal. The importance of these attempts is extremely limited, mainly due to the severe weather these ships had to operate in. Therefore, Pactolus Bank may itself be a phantom island.

In 2008, Dutchman Hylke Tromp, after some years of research, published a comprehensive report, containing all known facts and myths regarding the Pactolus Bank.

== Sources ==
- Knox-Johnston, Robin (1994). Cape Horn: A Maritime History. London: Hodder & Stoughton. ISBN 0-340-41527-4., pp 40–45
- Riesenberg, Felix (1939). Cape Horn: The Story of the Cape Horn Region. New York: Dodd, Mead & Co. ISBN 1-881987-04-3.
- Stommel, Henry (1984). Lost Islands: The Story of Islands That Have Vanished from Nautical Charts. Vancouver: University of British Columbia Press. ISBN 0-7748-0210-3., pp 77–78
- Tromp, Hylke. The Story of the Pactolus Bank. A lost Island near Cape Horn. Private publication, 2008.
