= Cape Foulweather =

Historic cape on the Oregon coast

Coordinates: 44°46′20″N 124°04′33″W

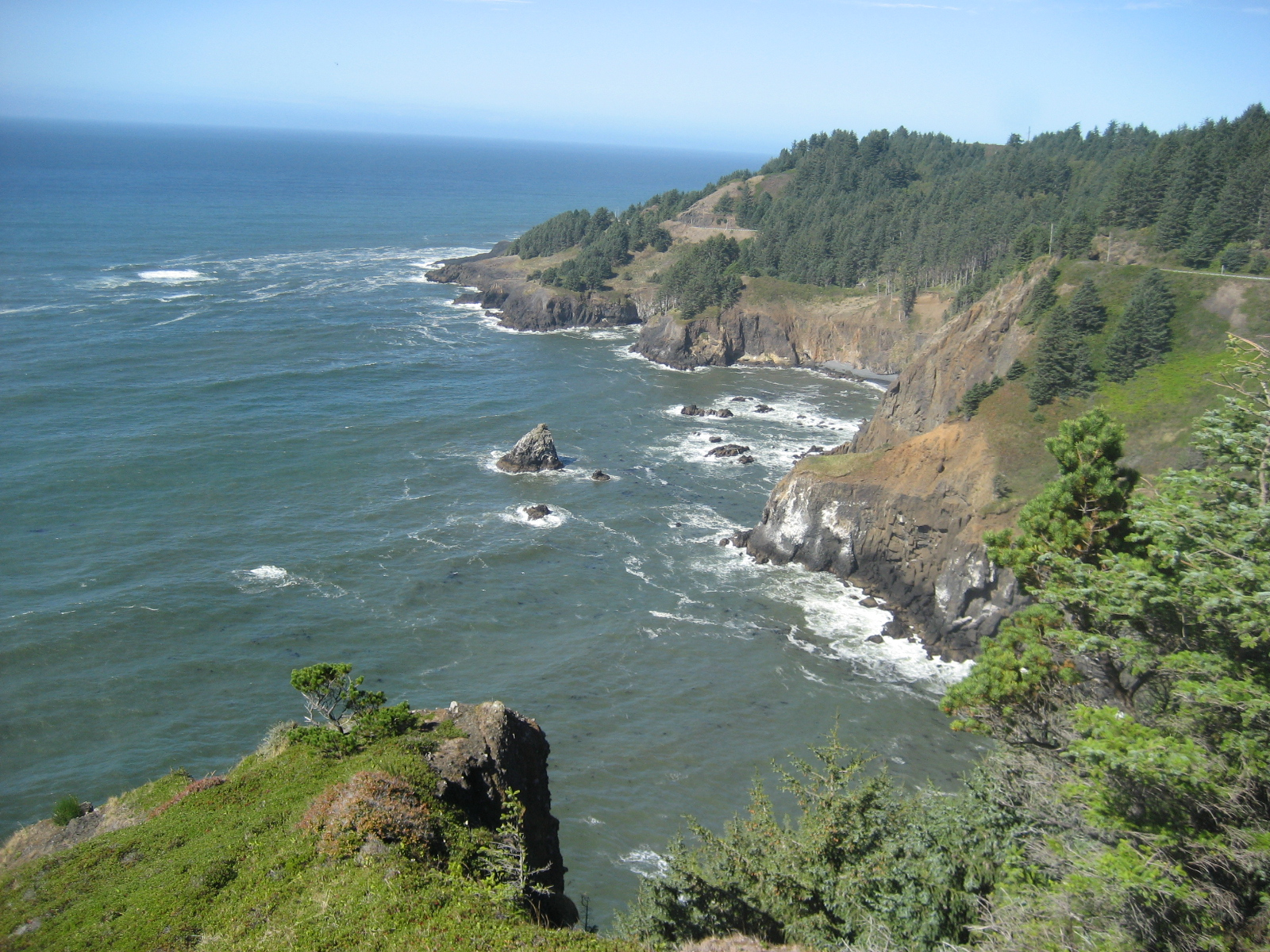
Cape Foulweather from Otter Crest State Scenic Viewpoint

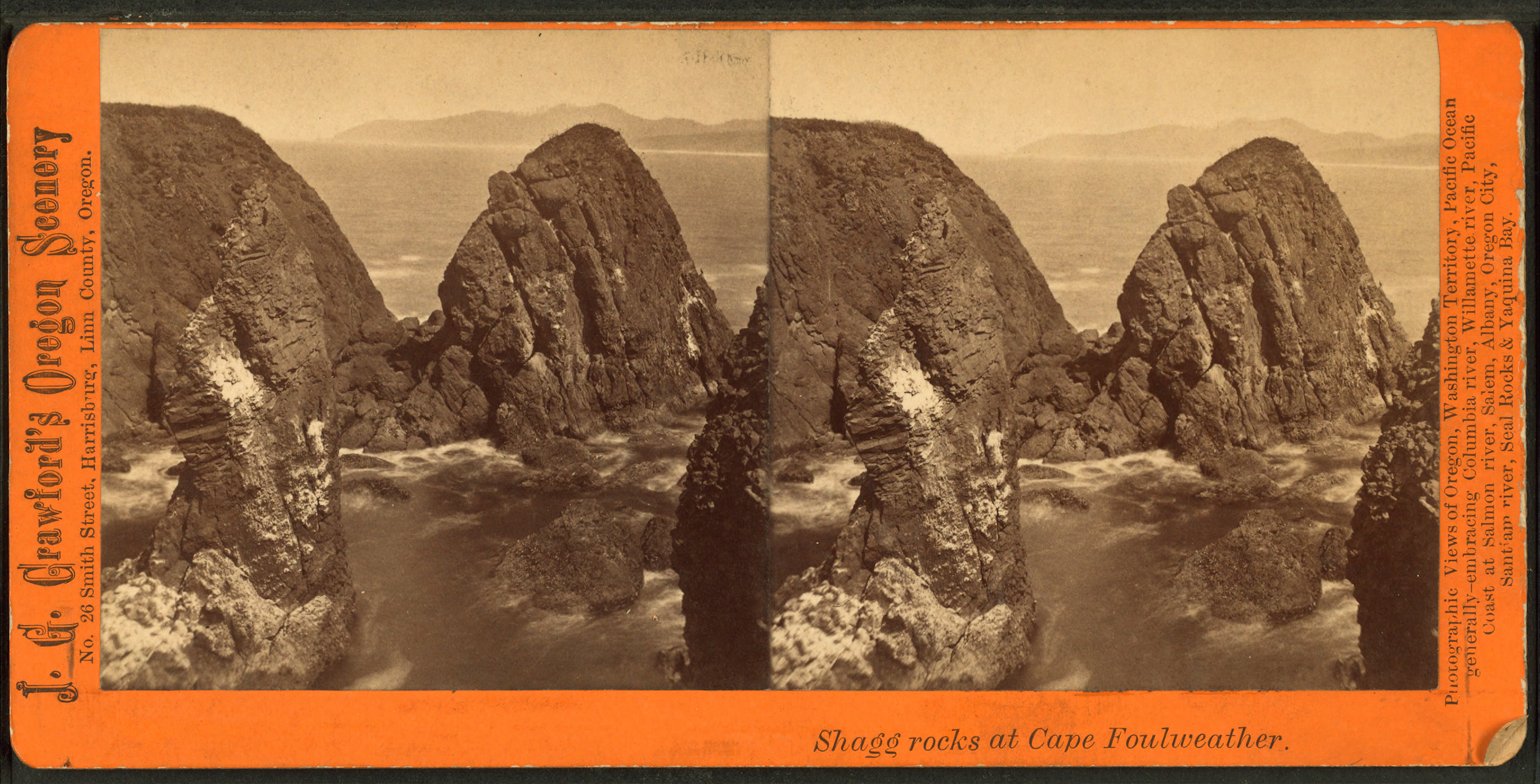
Stereoscopic image of Shagg Rocks at Cape Foulweather, late 19th or early 20th century.

Cape Foulweather is a basalt outcropping 500 feet (150 m) above the Pacific Ocean on the central coastline of the U.S. state of Oregon - in Lincoln County, south of Depoe Bay. It is bisected by US Highway 101, with a pass elevation of approximately 550 feet (170 m), which is the fourth highest point of the highway in Oregon. The cape is notable as the first promontory on the northwest coast of New Albion (as the area was then known) to be sighted and named by Captain James Cook, while on his third voyage around the world. His March 7, 1778 journal entry reads:

The land appeared to be of moderate height, diversified with hill and Valley and almost everywhere covered with wood. There was nothing remarkable about it except one hill…At the northern extreme the land formed a point which I called Cape Foulweather from the very bad weather we soon after met with.

The cape can be viewed from Otter Crest State Scenic Viewpoint.

== See also ==
- Whale Cove (Oregon)
