= Rocky Creek (Oregon) =

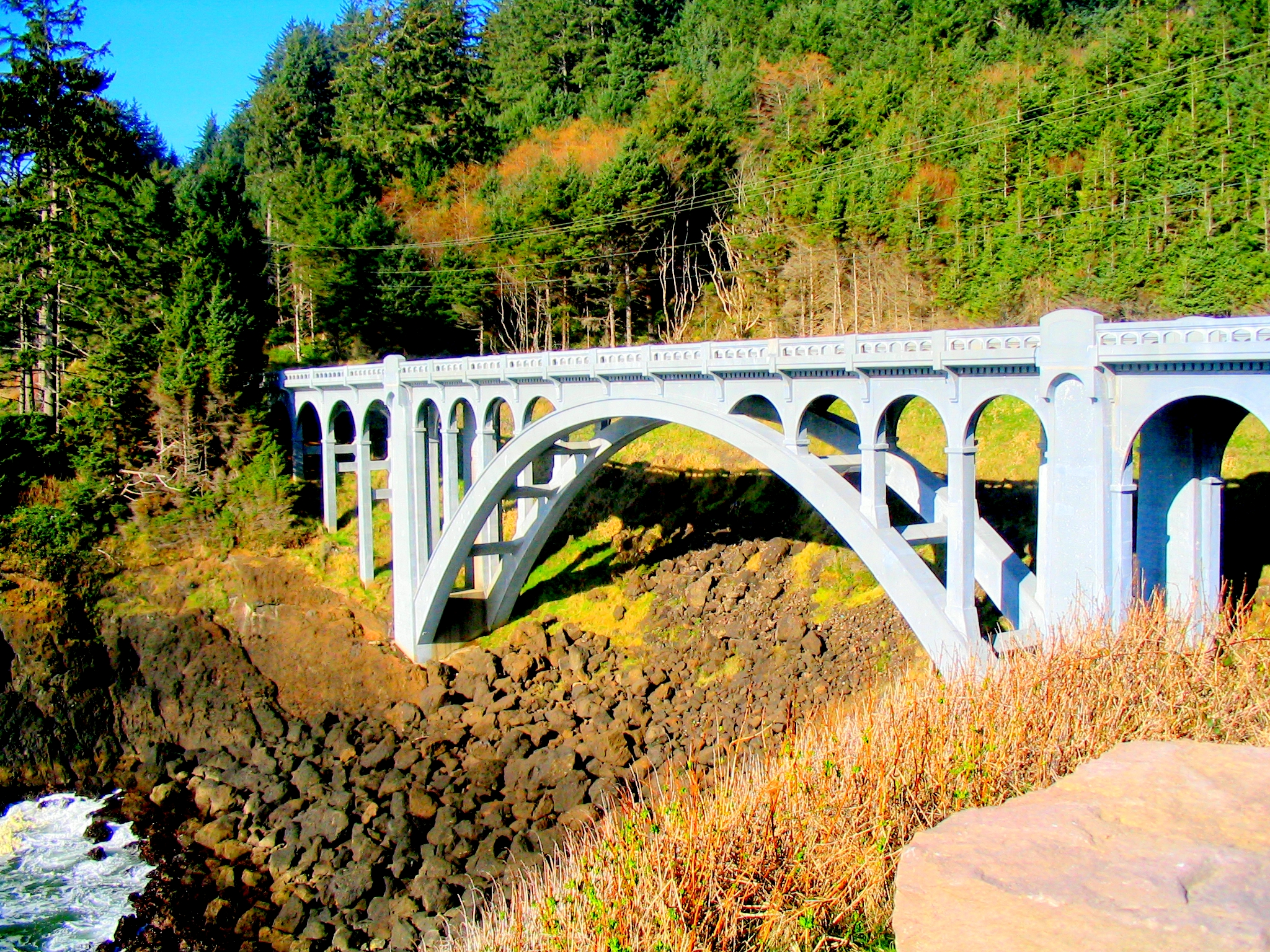
- Rocky Creek Bridge carries Otter Crest Loop Road.

- Location of the mouth of Rocky Creek in Oregon

Location
- Country: United States
- State: Oregon
- County: Lincoln

Physical characteristics
- Source: near the Pacific Ocean
  - location: Central Oregon Coast Range
  - coordinates: 44°46′46″N 123°59′59″W
  - elevation: 459 ft (140 m)
- Mouth: Pacific Ocean
  - location: near Depot Bay
  - coordinates: 44°46′42″N 124°04′18″W
  - elevation: 3 ft (0.91 m)

Rocky Creek is a short coastal stream in Lincoln County in the U.S. state of Oregon. It begins near the western extremities of the Central Oregon Coast Range and flows generally west to the ocean south of Depot Bay and north of Otter Rock. It has no named tributaries.

The creek passes under U.S. Route 101 and then Otter Crest Loop Road shortly before entering the ocean. Rocky Creek Bridge No. 01089, also known as the Ben Jones Bridge, carries the loop road over the creek immediately upstream of the creek mouth. The bridge was added to the National Register of Historic Places in 2005.

Rocky Creek State Scenic Viewpoint, a 58-acre (23 ha) state park, lies along a bluff between Whale Cove and Rocky Creek. The park extends south along the Otter Crest Loop Road to the Rocky Creek Bridge. The park, which is open year-round for day use, has picnic tables, parking spaces, and restrooms. Attractions include watching for whales, waves, and ocean birds along a rocky coast, and hiking through a forest of shore pines.

== See also ==
- List of rivers of Oregon
