= Sir Francis Drake Society =

American historical society in California

The Sir Francis Drake Society was an organization which supported research and celebrations related to Francis Drake’s 1579 landing at New Albion in Marin County, California. The Society was operated as an element within the California Historical Society.

The Society had annual meetings at Drakes Bay and invited speakers related to Drake’s landing. In 1949, the Society erected a cross at Drake’s Beach. Services from The Episcopal Church recognized the first Church of England service in what has become the United States and the first reading from the Book of Common Prayer.

As late as 1980, the Society was promoting Drake’s landing, issuing a commemorative glass bottle filled with Drakes Bay sand, one of which was presented to Queen Elizabeth II.

== Officers, notable members ==
- Aubrey Nesham
- Aubrey Drury
- Warren R. Hanna, president.

== See also ==
- Prayer Book Cross
