= Rocky Creek State Scenic Viewpoint =

State park in Oregon, United States

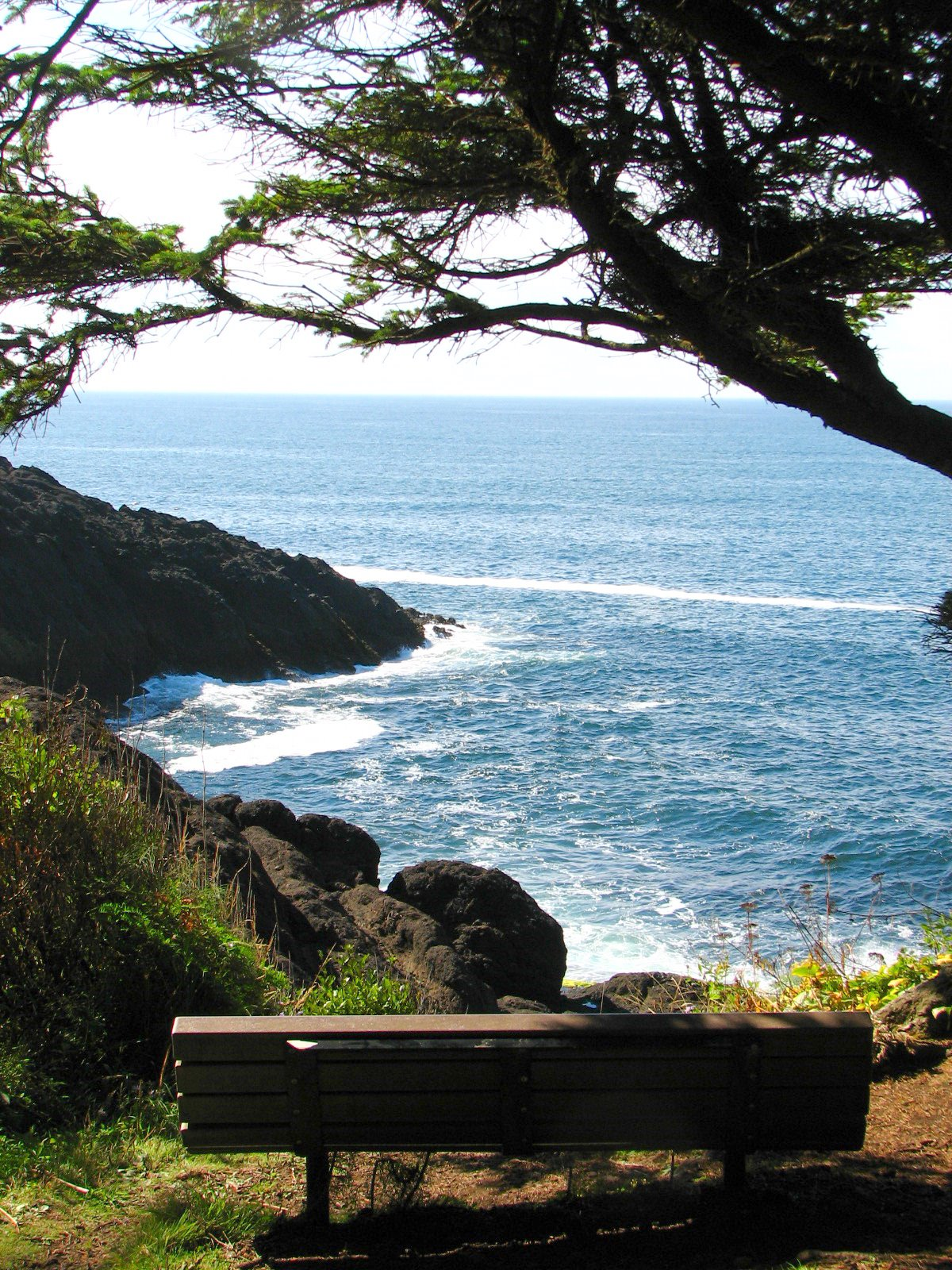
- The Pacific Ocean from Rocky Creek State Scenic Viewpoint

- Location within Oregon Location within the United States
- Type: Public, state
- Location: Lincoln County, Oregon
- Nearest city: Depot Bay
- Coordinates: 44°46′53″N 124°04′20″W
- Operator: Oregon Parks and Recreation Department
- Visitors: about 170,000 a year
- Status: Open all year for day use

Rocky Creek State Scenic Viewpoint is a state park in Lincoln County in northwestern Oregon, United States. Administered by the Oregon Parks and Recreation Department, the 59-acre (24 ha) park lies along a bluff between Whale Cove and Rocky Creek. The park extends south along the Otter Crest Loop Road to the Rocky Creek Bridge.

Between 1926 and 1954, the state bought land for the park from private owners and received other land for the park from the Federal government. The Civilian Conservation Corps undertook the original development of the site between 1934 and 1936.

Open year-round for day use, the park has picnic tables, parking spaces, and restrooms. Attractions include watching whales, waves, and ocean birds along a rocky coast, and hiking through a forest of shore pines.

== See also ==
- List of Oregon state parks
