= Thomas Doughty (explorer) =

English explorer executed by Francis Drake (1545–1578)

- Born: 1545; Plymouth, England
- Died: 2 July 1578 (aged 32–33); Puerto San Julián, Argentina
- Occupations: Soldier personal secretary
- Years active: 1577–78
- Known for: Explorer alongside Francis Drake

Thomas Doughty (1545 – 2 July 1578) was an English nobleman, soldier, scholar and personal secretary of Christopher Hatton. His association with Francis Drake, on a 1577 voyage to raid Spanish treasure fleets, ended in a shipboard trial for treason and witchcraft, and Doughty's execution.

Although some scholars doubt the validity of the charges of treason, and question Drake's authority to try and execute Doughty, the incident set an important precedent: according to a history of the English Navy, titled To Rule the Waves: How the British Navy Shaped the Modern World by Arthur L. Herman, Doughty's execution established the idea that a ship's captain was its absolute ruler, regardless of the rank or social class of its passengers.

== Source of conflict ==
Doughty befriended Drake during Drake's military actions in Ireland. Drake, Doughty and John Wynter left Plymouth, England in 1577, purportedly on a simple trip to Alexandria. Drake's real mission was to interfere with Spanish treasure fleets in the New World; whether he proceeded with the full knowledge and sanction of Queen Elizabeth I, and whether his original intent was the circumnavigation of the globe are still topics of scholarly debate (see Kelsey, "Sir Francis Drake: the Queen's Pirate.") The three men apparently shared responsibility for the voyage but Drake soon assumed the role of commander of the expedition, a matter which caused friction between Drake and the aristocratic Doughty.

Doughty was given command of a captured Portuguese ship, the Santa Maria (renamed Mary). The tension between Drake and Doughty worsened when Doughty caught Drake's brother, Thomas Drake, stealing from the captured cargo of the vessel. Drake assumed command of the Mary and reassigned Doughty to command his flagship the Pelican. During the long voyage across the Atlantic, Drake's hostility increased, fuelled by the rancor of his brother. Drake eventually demoted Doughty to command of a tiny supply vessel named Swan. This insult proved too much for Doughty to take, and he began to complain bitterly about "the Captain General".

== Charges ==
When the Swan became separated from the rest of the fleet during a severe storm, Drake became convinced that Doughty was practising witchcraft. On 17 May 1578, upon the reunion of the fleet, Drake and Doughty had a final quarrel; Drake struck Doughty and ordered him tied to the mast. By 3 June both Doughty and his brother, John Doughty, had been put under arrest and the sailors forbidden from interacting with them. Drake accused Doughty of being "a conjurer and a seditious person", and his brother of being "a witch and a poisoner".

== Trial and execution ==
The fleet arrived at Puerto San Julián, a natural harbour in Patagonia in the Santa Cruz Province of Argentina on 20 June. Doughty's trial began on 30 June; Drake charged Doughty with not only mutiny, but treason. Doughty first appealed to be taken with the fleet as a prisoner and tried upon return to England, but Drake refused. Doughty next demanded that Drake show his commission from the Queen allowing him such jurisdiction, which Drake again refused, to which lawyer and friend of Doughty, Leonard Vicary, responded, "This is not lawe nor agriable to justice." Drake responded, "I have not...to do with you crafty lawyars, neythar care I for the lawe, but I know what I wyll do."

The main body of evidence against Doughty is referenced in manuscripts found in the British Library and compiled in William Sandys Wright Vaux's edition of The World Encompassed, based on a log kept by Drake's chaplain, Francis Fletcher. This material contains a number of statements by Doughty that may have been made in the heat of anger. The statements could be interpreted as seditious, but would not be likely to be judged mutinous by a court of law (examined at length in Robinson and Hannay; the charges are reproduced in Vaux). There were two very damning pieces of evidence: the testimony of Edward Bright, the ship's carpenter, which, alone of the accusations, Doughty openly denied, and Doughty's own admission that he had disclosed the true purpose of their voyage to William Cecil, 1st Baron Burghley, a staunch advocate of avoiding trouble with the Spanish. Drake painted the disclosure to Burghley as a betrayal of Queen Elizabeth; nevertheless, the jury of crewmen convicted Doughty of mutiny only, rejecting the charge of treason, and only after Drake prevaricated about whether he would seek Doughty's death.

After obtaining the guilty verdict, Drake convened the jury and produced various documents from English nobility in support of himself; he did not, however, produce a royal commission, which he claimed to have left on board his ship. Arguing that Doughty was a threat to his life and the expedition in general, Drake demanded execution. The men eventually agreed although some reluctantly; Drake then asked if there were any reasonable proposals of alternative solutions. Doughty himself suggested that he be set loose once the fleet reached Peru, but Drake refused, claiming that Doughty would alert the Spaniards to their mission. John Wynter volunteered to keep Doughty prisoner on his ship, Elizabeth, to which Drake initially agreed, but qualified the statement by saying that the ship would then have to return to England with no share of the treasure they would gain from attacking Spanish ships. Wynter was soon shouted down by his crewmen, and Doughty's fate was sealed.

Doughty requested that he and Drake receive Communion together, and as reported by the contemporary account of Francis Fletcher, "And after this holy repast, they dined also at the same table together, as cheerfully, in sobriety, as ever in their lives they had done aforetime, each cheering up the other, and taking their leave, by drinking each to other, as if some journey only had been in hand." On 2 July, Doughty was beheaded. Shortly thereafter, Drake changed the name of his flagship from The Pelican to The Golden Hind purportedly to honour Christopher Hatton, whose crest was the hind, perhaps as an attempt to smooth over the Doughty incident.

== Aftermath and analysis ==
The conditions of the case – the initial close friendship of the men, the unlikely amicability of Doughty upon his demise – have inspired numerous theories as to what may have truly transpired between Doughty and Drake. Drake's own family eventually perpetuated the rumour that Doughty had been intimate with Drake's wife, Mary. Other historians have speculated that Doughty had been a spy in the employ of Burghley throughout the voyage.

Analysis indicates, however, that not all of the men wished to be a part of what was swiftly becoming a pirate raid; John Wynter specifically spoke against it. Kelsey concludes that Drake wanted to set a stern example against indiscipline in the crew; his choice to hold Doughty's trial on the same spot where Ferdinand Magellan had executed his mutineers could hardly have been coincidental. Nevertheless, the rest of the circumnavigation was plagued by bouts of dissent. In January 1580, when Drake became stranded upon a reef off the Celebes Sea, the ship's chaplain Francis Fletcher gave a sermon connecting their woes to the unjust demise of Doughty. For this action, Drake not only relieved Fletcher of his duties but chained him to a hatch cover and, despite his obvious lack of authority to do so, pronounced him excommunicated.

The Doughty incident continued to haunt Drake upon his return to England. There, John Doughty, brother of the deceased, sought legal recourse, but the action was dismissed on a technicality. There was also gossip about the inexplicable promotion of the carpenter, Edward Bright, to the position of master of the ship Marigold, which was inevitably read as payment for falsifying testimony against Doughty. Drake was never able to produce documents showing he had clear authority to act as he did. There was even a rumour, almost certainly false, that Drake was under hire by the Earl of Leicester to kill Doughty. According to the contemporary screed Leicester's Commonwealth (1584), Leicester desired Doughty's death because Doughty could incriminate him in the alleged murder of Walter Devereux, Earl of Essex.

== In popular culture ==
Doughty's execution is the subject of Robert E. Howard's Solomon Kane poem, "The One Black Stain".

In the episode of the 1960s UK children's TV series Sir Francis Drake, 'The Doughty Plot', the story of how Doughty was tried and executed is recounted, though it is not historically accurate and makes Drake out as the hero.

In 1980, "Drake's Venture", a full costume drama of the key events, was made for television, with John Thaw as Francis Drake and Paul Darrow as Thomas Doughty.
