= N. de Morena =

European ship pilot

N. de Morena or N. de Morera, name given to him by his contemporary Fray Juan de Torquemada and by most authors, was a European ship pilot in the 1577–1580 expedition of Sir Francis Drake. In ill health, he was reportedly left at New Albion in 1579 and once he recovered he walked to Mexico (then New Spain). In doing so, he likely was the first European to see San Francisco Bay and likely established the incorrect idea that California was an island. In only few and non-contemporaneous references, the name is given as "N. de Morena."
