= Prayer Book Cross =

Monument in San Francisco, California

Coordinates: 37°46′18.3″N 122°28′42″W

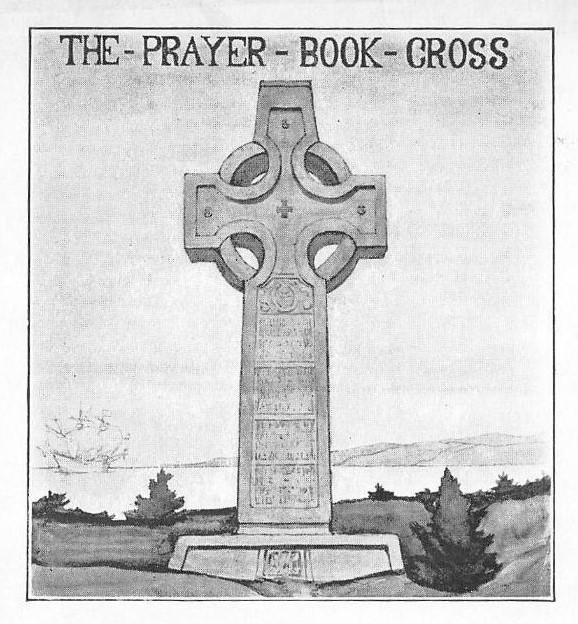
1906 drawing of the cross by the Reverend Dr. Clifton Macon (1869–1947)

The Prayer Book Cross, sometimes called the Sir Francis Drake Cross, is a large stone Celtic cross sculpture in Golden Gate Park in San Francisco, California. Dedicated in 1894, it commemorates Francis Drake’s landing in New Albion at nearby Drakes Bay and the first use of the Book of Common Prayer in what would become the United States.

== Concept and support ==
The Cross was conceived as an acknowledgment that California, not the U.S. east coast, was the founding location of New England and that several ecclesiastical "firsts" had been observed just north of San Francisco. The Cross acknowledges that Drake's chaplain, Francis Fletcher, celebrated the first Protestant service, that of the Church of England, on or about Saint-Jean-Baptiste Day, June 24, 1579 (Old Style). This corresponds to July 4 in the modern calendar.

The original plan was for the Cross to be placed three-quarters mile (1.2 km) from the Point Reyes Lighthouse. Instead, the Cross was built to coincide with the San Francisco Midwinter Fair of 1894. The Prayer Book Cross was paid for by George William Childs, a Philadelphia publisher, advocate for the Union during the Civil War and philanthropist.

== Construction ==
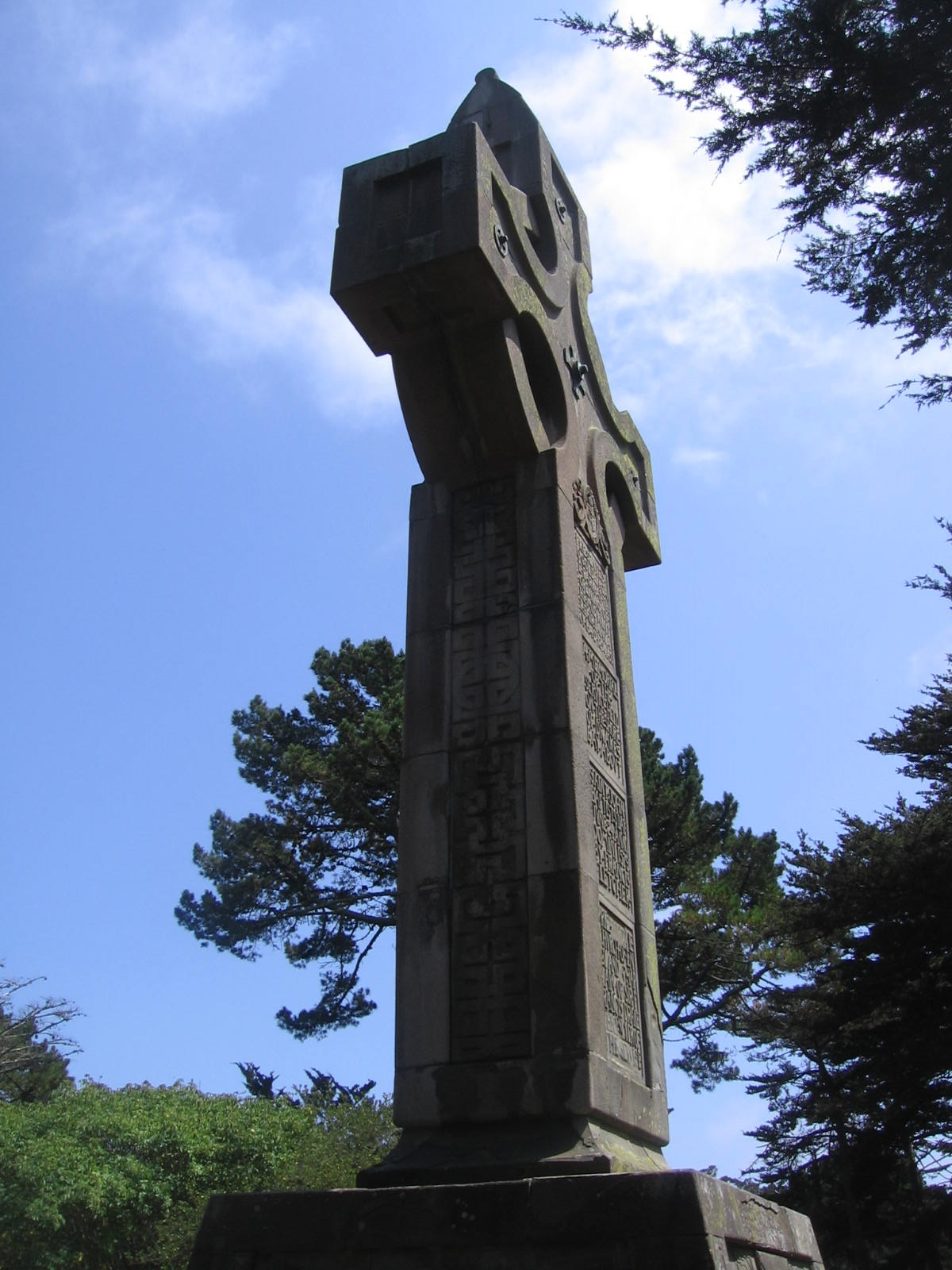
The cross in 2020 surrounded by trees

The monument is constructed on a pedestal of stone eighteen feet (5.5 m) square and seven feet (2.1 m) in height. The Cross is 57 feet (17 m) high. It is made of 68 pieces weighing 600,000 pounds (270,000 kg). The arms are formed of eight pieces weighing 24,000 pounds (11,000 kg) each. The blue sandstone came from a quarry in Colusa County, California. Construction began on November 4, 1892. The second arm stone was erected on 19 December 1893.

== Text ==
The text on the stone's front is "Presented to Golden Gate Park at the opening of the Mid-Winter Fair January 1 AD 1894, as a memorial of the service held on the shore of Drakes Bay about Saint John Baptist’s Day, June 24 Anno Domini 1579 by Francis Fletcher, Priest of the Church of England, Chaplain of Sir Francis Drake, chronicler of the service."

The text on the back is "First Christian Service in the English Tongue On Our Coast, First Use of the Book of Common Prayer in Our Country, One of the First Recorded Missionary Prayers On Our Continent, SOLI DEO SIT SEMPER GLORIA."

== Dedication ==
The Cross was dedicated on January 1, 1894. H. M. de Young, director-general of the Midwinter Exposition was the master of ceremonies. He introduced Bishop William Ford Nichols as the representative of the donor. Bishop Nichols pulled the cord which withdrew the flag covering the monument and thus presented the Cross to the commissioners of Golden Gate Park. Mr. W. W. Stow, Park Commissioner remarked on the large interest in the Midwinter Fair. George Davidson spoke on the history of Drake and his landing at Drakes Bay.

== Later use ==
Annual celebration described: Episcopal services have been held at the Cross on many occasions including 1906, 1908, 1909, 1911, 1912, 1913, 1924, 1931, and 1942

Several Episcopal congregations held pilgrimages to the Prayer Book Cross. These included 1951, and St. Columba's from Inverness in 1952.

The 400th anniversary of the Book of Common Prayer led to the 1949 triennial General Convention of The Episcopal Church being held in San Francisco, with the Cross as a prominent feature.

== See also ==
- Sir Francis Drake Society
- Annual Celebration at the Prayer Book Cross described
