= Otter Crest State Scenic Viewpoint =

State park in Oregon, United States

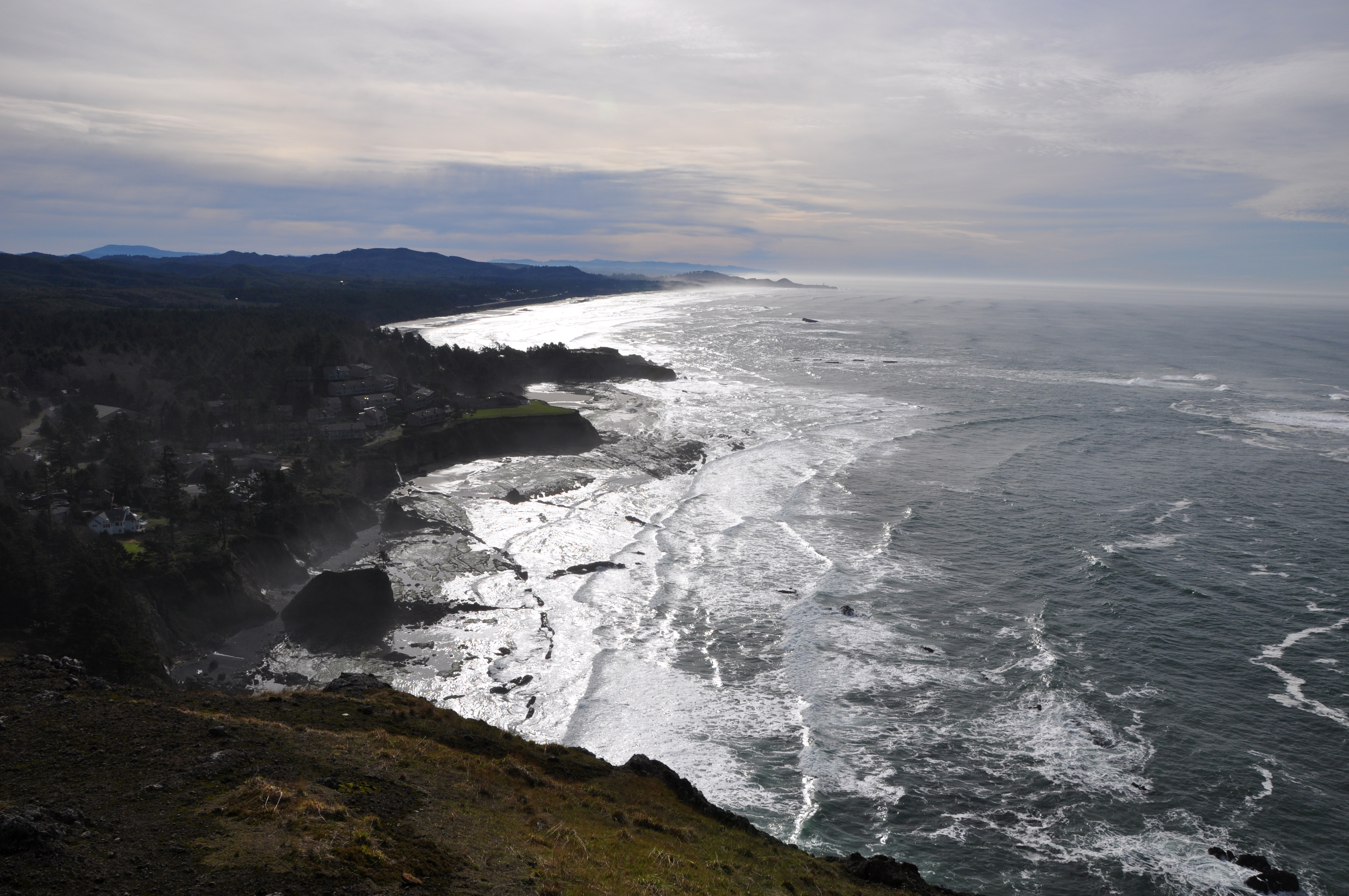
- View to the south from Otter Crest, just south of Cape Foulweather

- Location within Oregon Location within the United States
- Type: Public, state
- Location: Lincoln County, Oregon
- Nearest city: Depoe Bay
- Coordinates: 44°45′37″N 124°03′59″W
- Operator: Oregon Parks and Recreation Department

Otter Crest State Scenic Viewpoint is a state park in the U.S. state of Oregon, administered by the Oregon Parks and Recreation Department. Going north on State Highway 101 the turnoff to the left comes up quickly and is easy to miss in the dense foliage. The park features a view of Cape Foulweather.

== See also ==
- List of Oregon state parks
