= Drake's Venture =

1980 British television film

- Written by: John Nelson Burton
- Directed by: Lawrence Gordon Clark
- Starring: John Thaw; Paul Darrow; Charlotte Cornwall
- Music by: Stephen Jolliffe
- Country of origin: United Kingdom
- Original language: English

Production
- Producer: Lawrence Gordon Clark
- Production companies: Westward Television; Bayerischer Rundfunk

Original release
- Release: 28 December 1980

Drake's Venture is a 1980 film depiction of Francis Drake's voyage of circumnavigation. Produced by Westward Television to commemorate the 400th anniversary of the event, it focuses on the voyage's most controversial aspect, the execution of the gentleman Thomas Doughty for mutiny. The film has been aired in the UK on 28 December 1980 by Westward Television, on 19 October 2024 and 12 October 2025 by Rewind TV, and once in the US on Masterpiece Theatre on 27 March 1983.

== Plot ==
The film opens with Drake's return from his voyage of circumnavigation. He is nervous about how he will be received at home, and rightly so, for he has executed Thomas Doughty, an influential courtier, investor in the voyage, and formerly, his closest friend. The story is mostly told in flashback as Drake recounts the circumstances of the voyage to Queen Elizabeth I. Although it is clear how Drake interprets the events that led to Doughty's execution, the depicted scenes paint a more ambiguous tale. Conflict between Drake and Doughty grows due to an escalating pattern of Drake's increasing autocracy and paranoia, and Doughty's underhanded means to regain the authority he sees as rightly his due.

John Thaw as Francis Drake

Before the fleet leaves Plymouth, Drake learns that someone has betrayed the news of the voyage to William Cecil, Lord Burghley. Drake is upset as the destination of the venture - to raid Spanish ships in Peru and return home via a route theorised by John Dee called "the Straits of Anian" - is top secret, known only to Drake, Doughty, the Queen and a few select insiders. Drake has told the crew they will be voyaging to Alexandria on a trade mission.

Tension is high when the truth is revealed. A few of Drake's crewmen are discontent at being tricked into a long, dangerous voyage; Doughty has second thoughts and tries to convince Drake to redirect the fleet to less uncertain plunder on the Spanish Main. Drake is resolute, but alienates his former friend through his high-handedness. Doughty believes that his investment, his advocacy of the venture at court, and his command of the soldiers accompanying the fleet, entitle him to equal command.

The fleet encounters the Santa Maria, a Portuguese vessel. Upon its capture, Drake induces the cooperation of its captain and navigator, Nuno da Silva, who has an extensive knowledge of the coastline of Brazil. Hostilities escalate when Drake reprimands one of Doughty's officers for stealing from a Portuguese prisoner.

Doughty is given command of the prize ship. Drake's ship, the Pelican, immediately falls victim to a number of misfortunes including a lack of wind and an outbreak of scurvy. Doughty's ship is nowhere to be found. Drake becomes increasingly paranoid, attributing the misfortunes to Doughty's betrayal and his interest in the occult.

Upon the reunion of the ships, Doughty continues to agitate for what he perceives is his due: co-equal status in directing the fleet. He has a final confrontation with Drake, who strikes him and has him bound to the mast of the Pelican.

The film climaxes at the scene of Doughty's execution at San Julián. Drake brings Doughty to trial, accusing him of mutiny and witchcraft. Encouraged by his nephew, Drake induces the ship's carpenter, Ned Bright, to perjure himself in order to assure the conviction. Drake manipulates the men into sentencing Doughty to death. The chaplain, Francis Fletcher, tries to persuade Doughty to confess his sins, but the gentleman protests his innocence until the end. He takes communion with Drake and goes resolutely to his death. Drake then makes a speech promising the men wealth beyond their wildest dreams, but the gentlemen adventurers and the mariners must settle their differences. He changes the name of the Pelican to the Golden Hind, in hopes of placating Sir Christopher Hatton, Doughty's former employer.

Thomas Doughty's Last Confession

Drake's successful exploits of plunder and subsequent return to England are covered almost incidentally. One disturbing scene involves the abandonment of the navigator Nuno da Silva on the shores of Mexico. Drake knows that da Silva will certainly fall into the hands of the Spanish Inquisition, yet is unwilling for a Portuguese national to see the Straits of Anian. The treatment of da Silva is extremely upsetting to the crew, including Drake's nephew, who formerly idolized his uncle.

Drake cannot find Anian, and so returns home the long way, by going completely around the globe. After hearing Drake's story, Elizabeth, clearly interested in the riches which Drake has won, grants him her full protection from Doughty's friends and from the Spanish king, who has demanded his execution. She cynically informs him that if he had not succeeded, he would be as good as dead for the execution of Doughty. The film ends with Drake's knighthood, a triumph that seems oddly hollow due to the strained reaction shots of some of the surviving characters including Drake's nephew and the preacher, Francis Fletcher.

== Production ==
According to actor Paul Darrow, Drake's Venture was Westward Television's attempt to justify its franchise renewal. The subject matter was especially appropriate since Westward's logo was the Golden Hind. The attempt failed and the news that the south-west franchise was given to TSW (Television South West) was made during a commercial break during the lone showing of Drake's Venture in Britain.

What little we know of the production is from Darrow's autobiography, You're Him, Aren't You?. In it, he remarks that the filming took three months, using a full-scale authentic replica of the Golden Hind. The ocean scenes were filmed in the English Channel; the location shooting for San Julian was at Slapton Sands in Devon. According to Darrow, the sea was rough and Michael Irving, the actor who played Leonard Vicary, became so ill he had to be hospitalized, of necessity reducing his role in the film.

== Cast ==
- John Thaw as Francis Drake
- Charlotte Cornwell as Elizabeth I
- Paul Darrow as Thomas Doughty
- Terence Budd as John Drake
- Roger Adamson as Francis Fletcher
- Paul Alexander as Ned Bright
- Peter Cellier as Sir Christopher Hatton
- Alan Downer as Nuno da Silva
- Michael Irving as Leonard Vicary
- Esmond Knight as John Dee
- David Ryall as Sir Francis Walsingham
- Michael Stroud as Admiral Winter
- Michael Turner as Lord Burghley
- Michael Goldie as John Brewer
- John Curless as Pascos
- Philip Trewinnard as Tresillian
- David Shaw as Machaumont
- Alan Penn as Royal Messenger
- Doel Lubcombe as 1st fisherman
- Martin Bax as 2nd fisherman
