= Sars Bank =

Bank in the Drake Passage

Sars Bank (named for M. Sars and G. O. Sars) is located in the Drake Passage in between the southern tip of South America and Antarctica. The bank's coordinates are 59°35′22.18″S 69°0′42.87″W, about 350 km south of Diego Ramírez Islands and 500 km from the South Shetland Islands. The top of the bank lies a few hundred meters under sea level.

The bank has been proposed by Chilean historian Mateo Martinic as the location of the phantom Elizabeth Island, seen by Francis Drake's expedition in 1578. If the Sars Bank was ever above sea level it may have had significant biogeographical importance as a "bridge" between South America and Antarctica.

== See also ==
- Insular Chile
- Peter I Island
