= Rocky Creek Bridge No. 01089 =

- U.S. National Register of Historic Places
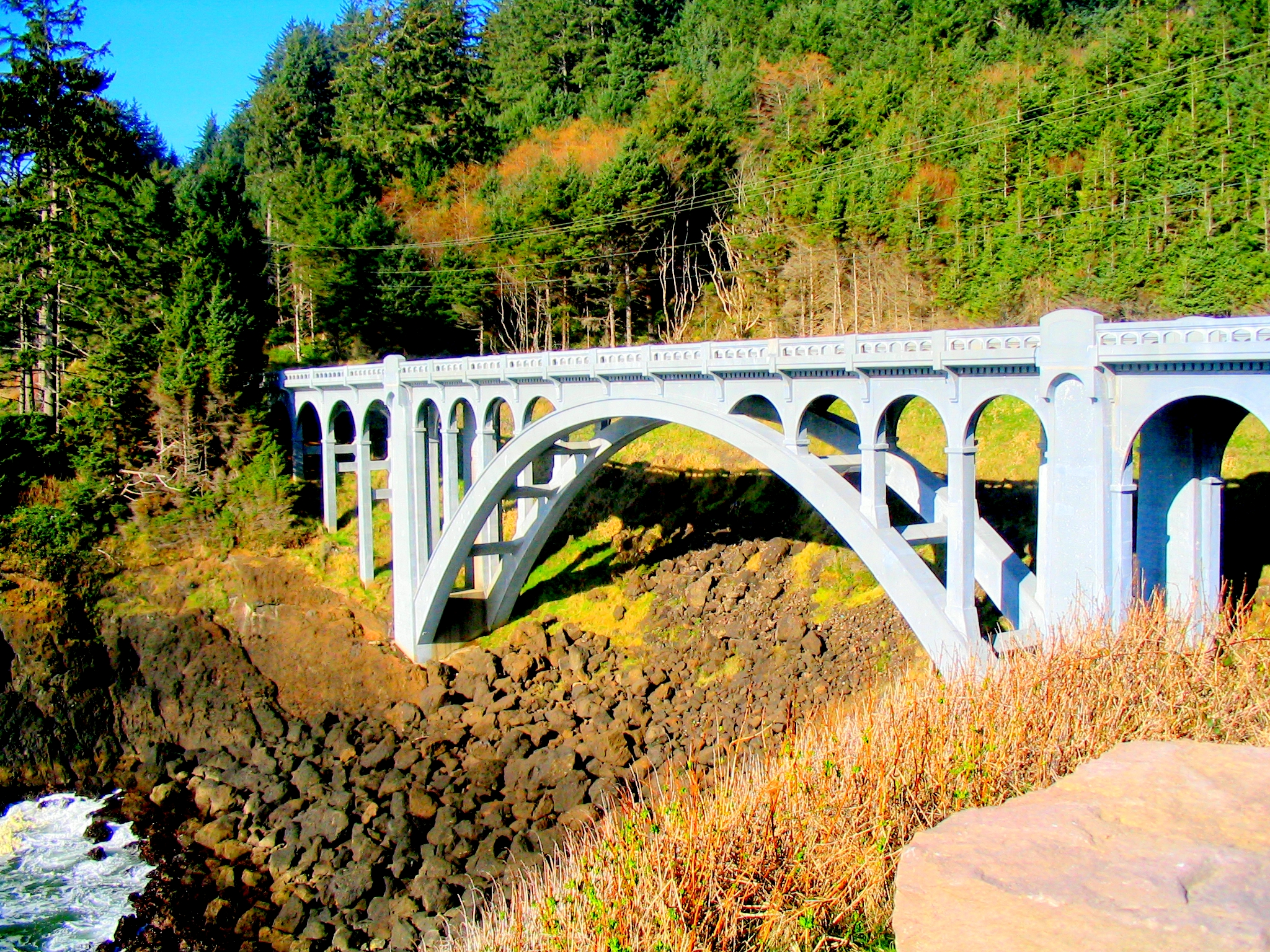
- Rocky Creek Bridge carries Otter Crest Loop Road over the creek where it meets the ocean.

- Location within Oregon Location within the United States
- Nearest city: Depoe Bay
- Coordinates: 44°46′43″N 124°04′17″W
- Area: 0.5 acres (0.20 ha)
- Built: 1927
- Built by: H. E. Doering
- Architect: Conde B. McCullough
- Architectural style: Classical Revival
- MPS: McCullough, C. B., Major Oregon Coast Highway Bridges MPS
- NRHP reference No.: 05000824
- Listed: August 5, 2005

Rocky Creek Bridge No. 01089, also known as Ben Jones Bridge, is a concrete highway bridge spanning Rocky Creek along the Pacific Ocean coast of the U.S. state of Oregon. The bridge crosses a gorge near the creek's mouth, about 2 miles (3 km) south of Depoe Bay in Lincoln County. Built in 1927, the bridge originally carried U.S. Route 101 (the Oregon Coast Highway) over the creek. After a stretch of the highway was relocated to make it straighter, the abandoned piece of the old highway became Otter Crest Loop Road, a local road west of the new highway.

Designed by Conde McCullough, the arch bridge is 360 feet (110 m) long. McCullough, the state bridge engineer from 1919 to 1936, designed many bridges along the Oregon Coast Highway, which extended north–south from Washington to California. Jones was a lawyer who helped establish Lincoln County in 1893, who served as mayor of the Oregon cities of Toledo and Newport, and who introduced legislation at the state level that led to construction of the coast highway.

The Oregon Department of Transportation repaired and reconstructed parts of the deteriorating bridge in 2001 and added safety features. The Oregon State Historic Preservation Office assisted with the project, and the bridge was added to the National Register of Historic Places in 2005.

== See also ==
- List of bridges documented by the Historic American Engineering Record in Oregon
- List of bridges on U.S. Route 101 in Oregon
- List of bridges on the National Register of Historic Places in Oregon
- National Register of Historic Places listings in Lincoln County, Oregon
