= Anales del Instituto de la Patagonia =

- Discipline: Natural science
- Language: English, Spanish
- Edited by: Américo Montiel San Martin

Publication details
- History: 1970–present
- Publisher: University of Magallanes (Chile)
- Frequency: Continuous
- Open access: Yes
- License: Creative Commons Attribution-NonCommercial-ShareAlike 4.0 International License

Standard abbreviations
- ISO 4: An. Inst. Patagon.

Indexing
- ISSN: 0718-6932 (print); 0718-686X (web)
- LCCN: 2005240111
- OCLC no.: 938845555

Links
- Journal homepage; Online archive

The Anales del Instituto de la Patagonia is a biannual peer-reviewed scientific journal published by the University of Magallanes. It publishes articles on natural science with a focus on Earth science or biology regarding Patagonia, Tierra del Fuego, and Antarctica. The editor-in-chief is Américo Montiel San Martin (University of Magallanes).

== Abstracting and indexing ==
The journal is abstracted and indexed in Biological Abstracts, BIOSIS Previews, CAB Abstracts, and The Zoological Record.
