= New Albion =

Part of modern California claimed for England by Francis Drake

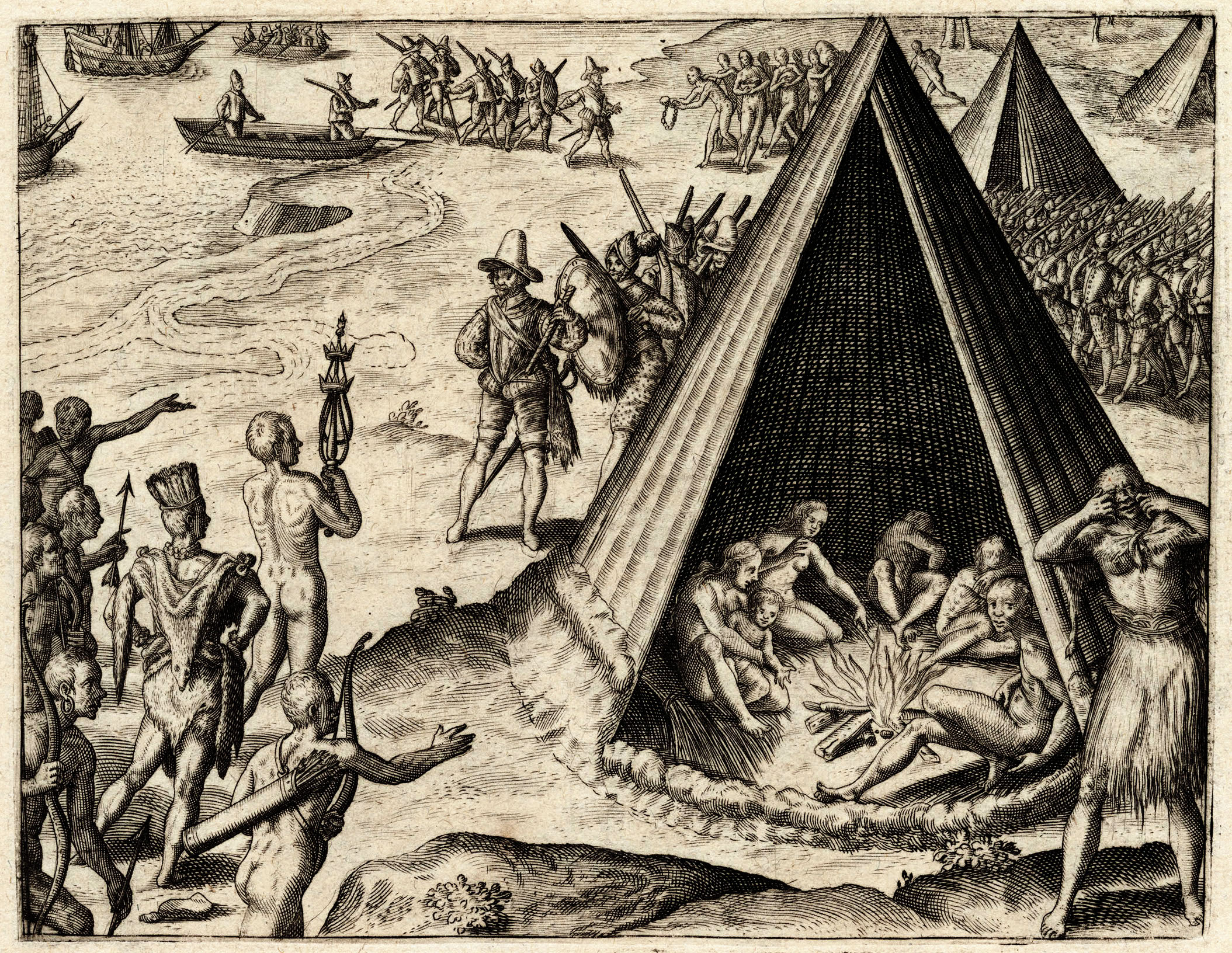
- Drake's Landing in New Albion, 1579, engraving published by Theodor De Bry, 1590

- Location of Drake's Nova Albion claim in California New Albion (the United States)
- Coordinates: 38°01′57″N 122°56′24″W
- Established: 17 June 1579
- Abandoned: 23 July 1579
- Named for: the white cliffs of England and the archaic name of Britain
- Claimant: Sir Francis Drake

New Albion, also known as Nova Albion (in reference to an archaic name for Great Britain), was the name of the continental area north of Mexico claimed by Sir Francis Drake for England when he landed on the North American west coast in 1579. This claim became the justification for English charters across America from the Atlantic to the Pacific and soon influenced further national expansion projects on the continent. Drake's landing site has been identified as Drake's Cove, which is part of Point Reyes National Seashore.

Drake, after successfully sacking Spanish towns and plundering Spanish ships along Spain's eastern Pacific coast colonies, sought safe harbour to prepare his ship, Golden Hind, for circumnavigation back to England. He found it on 17 June 1579, when he and his crew landed on the Pacific coast at Drakes Bay in Northern California. While encamped there, he had friendly relations with the Coast Miwok people who inhabited the area near his landing. Naming the area Nova Albion, or New Albion, he claimed sovereignty of the area for Queen Elizabeth I, an act which would have significant long-term historical consequences. Sailing away on 23 July and leaving behind no colony, Drake eventually circumnavigated the globe and returned to England in September 1580.

Over the years, numerous speculative sites along the North American Pacific coast were investigated as the area of Drake's New Albion claim. Through the following centuries, various cartographers and mariners identified the area near Point Reyes as Drake's likely landing place. In the 20th and 21st centuries, researchers gathered definitive evidence, particularly regarding Drake's contact with the Coast Miwok people and porcelain shards which were established to be remnants of Drake's cargo. The various avenues of research led to a National Historic Landmark designation by the United States Department of the Interior in October 2012 and a California Historical Landmark designation by California State Parks in October 2021.

== Drake's voyage ==
=== Background ===
In the late 1500s, a cold war existed between England and Spain—one which involved religious differences, economic pressure, and emerging navigational and colonisation desires. As part of this, Sir Francis Drake developed a plan to plunder Spanish colonial settlements on the Pacific Coast of the New World. Gathering several investors, and likely with the backing of Queen Elizabeth I—which may have been in the form of a secret commission as a privateer—Drake embarked upon the voyage on 15 November 1577. Even though Drake's actions would damage England's relations with Spain's King Philip II, Drake understood he could rely upon Queen Elizabeth's support.

After successfully taking considerable amounts of treasure from Spanish towns and ships along King Philip's eastern Pacific coast colonies, Drake sailed north to seek a shortcut back to England via the hypothetical Strait of Anián, a supposedly navigable shortcut connecting the Pacific and Atlantic. The strait, a fanciful idea similar to the Fountain of Youth, was speculated to exist at about 40 degrees north. Although Drake may have possibly reached a latitude as high as 48 degrees, his northward progress was ultimately stopped by foul weather in the northeast trade winds belt. Upon failing to locate the strait, Drake sought safe harbour to ready his ship, Golden Hind, before attempting a circumnavigation of the globe to return home.

=== Drake's coastal exploration and claim ===
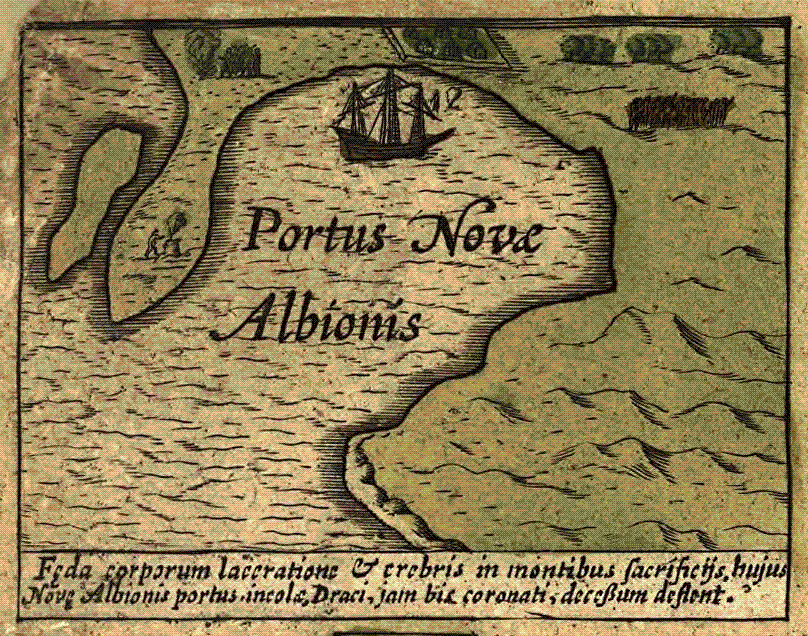
This inset of the Hondius map, Vera Totius Expeditionis Navticae, depicts Drake's encampment at New Albion, Portus Novae Albionis. The Latin word portus denotes a port or harbor within a river or estuary near its mouth, correlating with the geography of Drake's Cove.

Prior to Drake's voyage, the western coast of North America had only been partially explored in 1542 by Juan Rodríguez Cabrillo, who sailed for Spain. So, intending to avoid further conflict with Spain, Drake navigated northwest of the Spanish presence. By navigating well beyond where Cabrillo had asserted a Spanish claim, Drake sought to locate a discreet site at which the crew could prepare for the journey back to England.

On 5 June 1579, the ship briefly made first landfall at South Cove, Cape Arago, just south of Coos Bay, Oregon. From there, Drake sailed south while searching for a suitable harbour to repair his ailing ship. On 17 June, Drake and his crew found a protected cove when they landed on the Pacific coast of what is now Northern California. While ashore, he claimed the area for Queen Elizabeth I as Nova Albion or New Albion, choosing this name for two reasons: first, the white banks and cliffs which he saw were similar to those found on the English coast and, second, because Albion was an archaic name by which the island of Great Britain was known. To document and assert his claim, Drake had an engraved plate of brass, one which contained a sixpence bearing Elizabeth's image, attached to a large post. Giving details of Drake's visit, it claimed sovereignty for Elizabeth and every successive English monarch.

After erecting a fort and tents ashore, the crew laboured for several weeks as they prepared for the circumnavigating voyage ahead by careening their ship, Golden Hind, so to effectively clean and repair the hull. Drake had friendly interactions with the Coast Miwok and explored the surrounding land by foot when crossing Inverness Ridge to visit a village and explore the country. When his ship was ready for the return voyage, Drake and the crew left New Albion on 23 July and paused his journey the next day when anchoring his ship at the Farallon Islands where the crew hunted seal meat. On 25 July, they sailed west to continue their Pacific crossing, and Golden Hind finally returned to England in September 1580.

=== English response ===
Drake's circumnavigation began a period of British maritime dominance that lasted until the 20th century, and as a result of his successful deeds against Spain, Drake was admired and celebrated by many in England. According to John Stow, Drake's "name and fame became admirable in all places, the people swarming daily in the streets to behold him, vowing hatred of all that durst mislike him." Not only were his investors and the queen richly rewarded, Drake was also allowed to keep £24,000 of the purloined treasure for himself and his crew. Drake quickly became a favorite at the queen's court and was knighted by the French ambassador on her behalf.

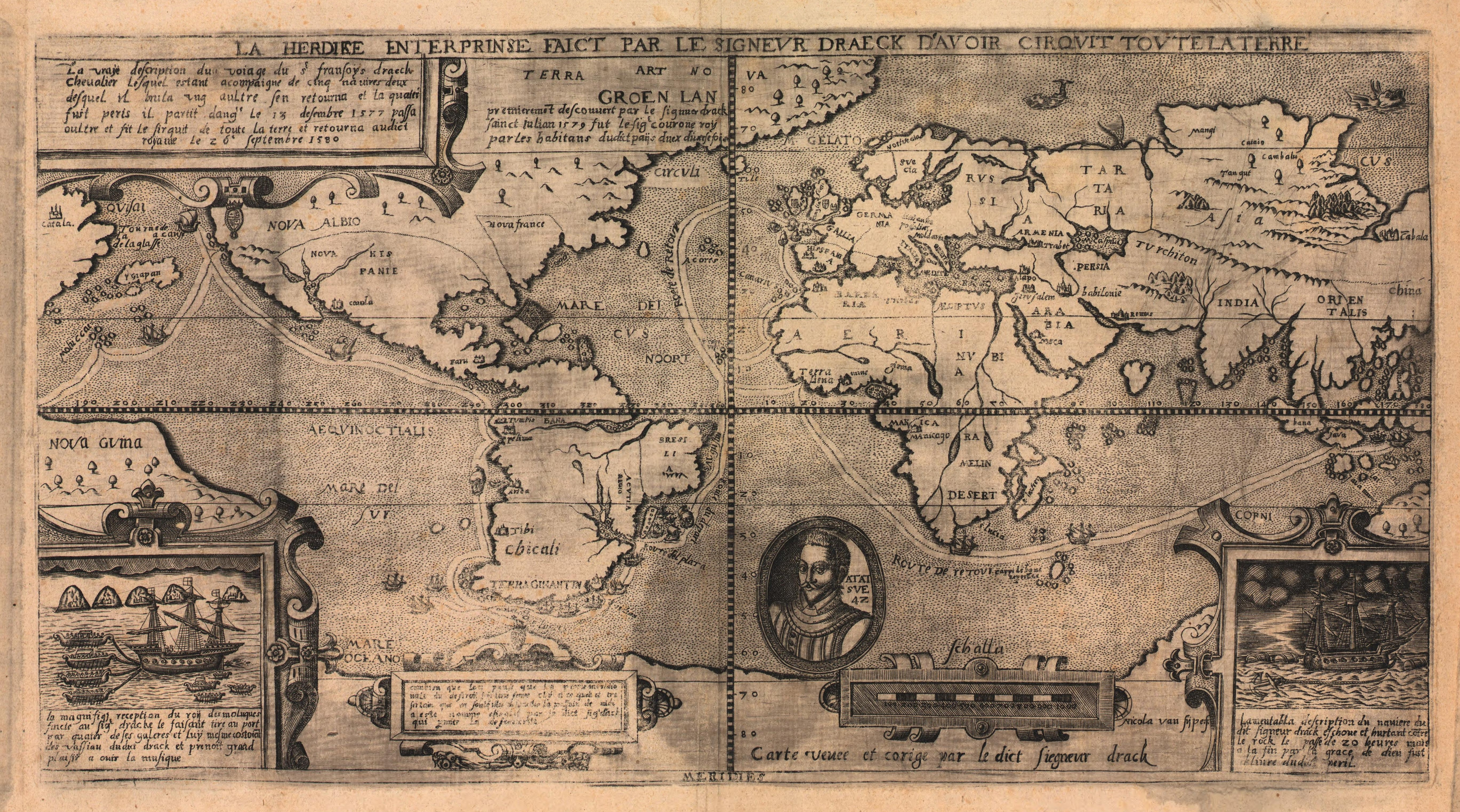
This early 1580s Nikola van Sype map shows Nova Albion as an imprecise area across the western part of North America.

To allow for disinformation and create an illusory threat that Drake had discovered a short route from the Pacific to Europe, details of the voyage were initially suppressed; Drake's sailors were pledged not to disclose their route under threat of death. Upon his return, Drake handed over his log and a large map to the queen. While the other items disappeared, the map, known as the Queen's Map, remained on limited view for a number of years. Finally, it too was lost in the Whitehall Palace fire of 1698. However, around 1590 Jodocus Hondius composed a derivative of this map, known as Vera Totius Expeditionis Navticae. This map shows Drake's journey and includes an inset of the harbor at Nova Albion. In 1589, further details emerged when an official account of Drake's circumnavigating voyage by Richard Hakluyt was published. In 1628, Drake's nephew and namesake, Sir Francis Drake, 1st Baronet, published The World Encompassed. This comprehensive account of the voyage, which is based on the notes of Drake's chaplain Francis Fletcher, includes numerous details of New Albion and is the most extensive account of Drake's voyage.

Because the extent of Drake's New Albion was vague—essentially a classification of the territory north and west of Spanish territory—the designated location differs among maps. After Elizabeth's death in 1603, maps began to depict the area of North America above Mexico as Nova Albion. Drake's claim of land on the Pacific coast for England became a basis which influenced subsequent colonial charters issued by English monarchs that purported to grant lands from sea to sea, the area from the Atlantic where English colonies were first established all the way to the Pacific. Along with Martin Frobisher's claims in Greenland and Baffin Island and Humphrey Gilbert's 1583 claim of Newfoundland, New Albion was one of the earliest English territorial claims in the New World. These claims were eventually followed by settlement of the Roanoke Colony in 1584, and Jamestown in 1607.

== The people and the land ==
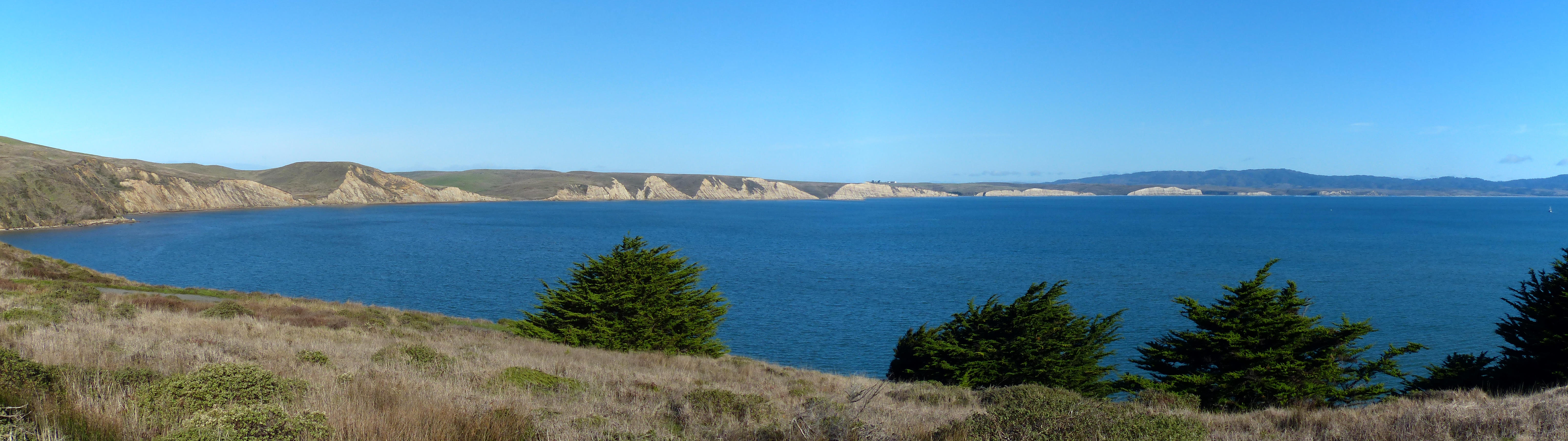
Drakes Bay and the white cliffs which inspired the name Nova Albion

By using detailed descriptions of the people encountered by Drake—particularly their houses, feathered baskets, ceremonies, and language—anthropologists have clearly identified the people as Coast Miwok, a people whose traditional homeland included the Point Reyes area in what is now present-day Marin County, California.

When Drake landed his crew, the Coast Miwok people initially approached his encampment while armed with bows and arrows, uncertainly cautious regarding the newcomers. But Drake quickly allayed their suspicions, and multitudes of unarmed Miwok soon visited his encampment on a daily basis. In their early encounters with the Coast Miwok, Drake's crew observed as the Miwok wailed and engaged in self-laceration. Drake misinterpreted this response as an act of worship and concluded that the people believed him and his crew to be gods; however, this Miwok custom was actually one of mourning. Most likely the Miwok regarded the English visitors as relatives who had returned from the dead.

In a particularly significant gesture, one day a large assembly of Coast Miwok descended on the encampment and honored Drake by placing chains around his neck, a sceptre in his hand, and a crown of feathers on his head as if he were being proclaimed king. Upon this uncertain, seemingly voluntary surrender of sovereignty by its owners, England based its presumed legal authority to the territory.

After gaining the Coast Miwoks' trust, Drake journeyed to explore the inland area and visit their villages. Accompanied by crew members, Drake trekked on a Coast Miwok trail to traverse the Inverness Ridge and descend into what is now the Olema Valley. Fletcher described the village structures there as round subterranean buildings which came together at the top like spires on a steeple. Fletcher also described the Coast Miwok baskets as water-tight, shaped like a deep bowl, and covered with a matted layer of colored feathers. Such baskets were made only by the Coast Miwok, Pomo, Lake Miwok, Patwin, and Wappo peoples who were all concentrated near Drake's landing site.

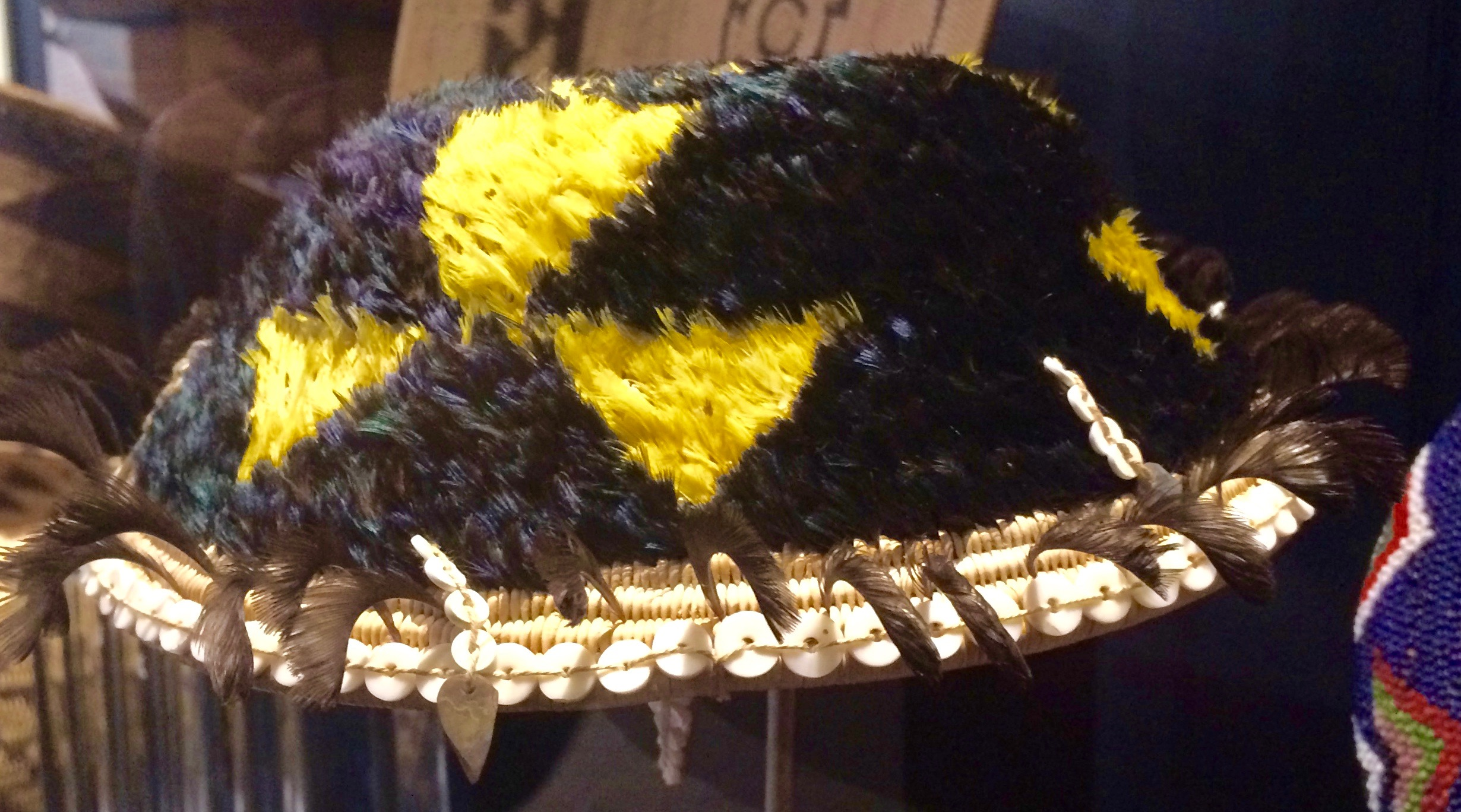
This basket, on display at the Jesse Peter Museum, is similar to the fully feathered basket described in The World Encompassed.

Additionally, Fletcher was the first person to make a written record of any of the 64 distinct language groups in prehistoric California, namely five specific Coast Miwok words: Hioh, Gnaah, Huchee kecharo, Nacharo mu, and Cheepe. These words noted by Fletcher are from a distinct language group, and Heizer wrote that they were unquestionably of Coast Miwok derivation, linguistic proof of Drake's contact with the Coast Miwok. Overall, the relations between the Coast Miwok and their visitors were peaceful and friendly, and the Miwok seemed to exhibit distress when Golden Hind sailed away.

Fletcher also recorded climate information and characterised the unpleasant summer weather conditions of the area near the careenage basin. He noted the continuous nipping chill; lack of sun; and cold, sometimes violent, winds. In contrast, across the Inverness Ridge, he found a distinct climate variance and experienced a flourishing land. Fletcher assessed the area: "The inland we found to be farre different from the shoare, a goodly country and fruitful soyle, stored with many blessings fit for the use of man".

Fletcher also chronicled his observation of certain animals unknown to the English and described them as "very large and fat Deere" and "a multitude of a strange kinde of Conies." The "fat Deere" were most likely Roosevelt elk, and the conies are identified as gophers. These and the rest of Fletcher's assessments and observations of New Albion are flawlessly in concert with the geography of Point Reyes.

== Historical influence ==
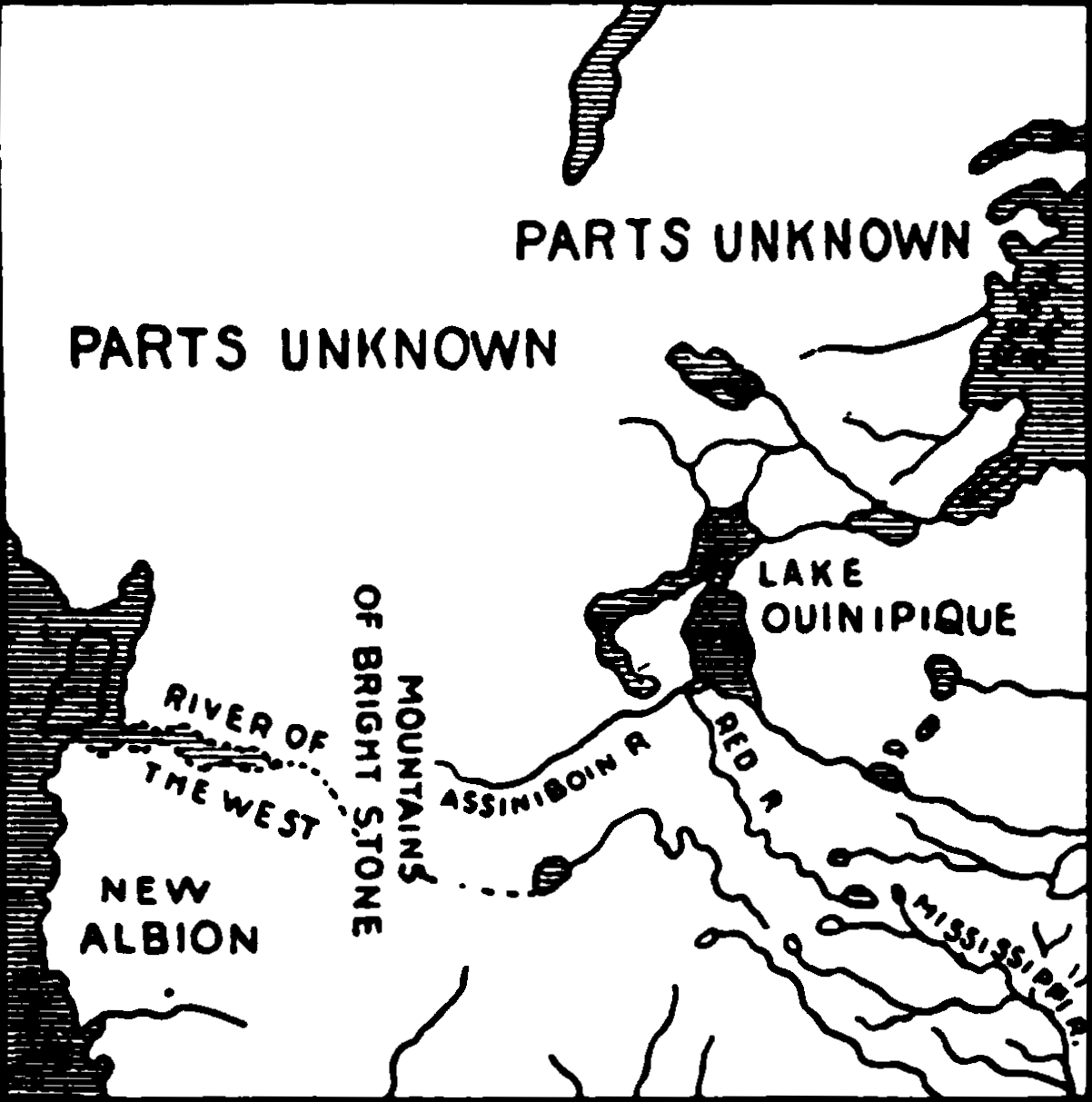
Jonathan Carver's 1778 map shows the continuing Nova Albion claim.

The New Albion claim had far-reaching historical consequences. Even though Drake attempted no long-term presence and the English made no immediate follow-up to the claim, it constituted England's first assertion of sovereignty on the North American Pacific coast. And since all of their subsequent expeditions along the North American Pacific coast were infrequent and irregular, Nova Albion was primarily a geographical designation—a new, distinctive name on the world map. Ultimately, this designation was significant because it proclaimed England's ability—and presumed right—to establish an empire in the Americas. Consequently, Drake's New Albion claim was a forward-thinking, considered component of a new national expansion policy, one of several of his exploits which both determined Elizabeth's policy for the duration of her reign and indirectly influenced England's continuing historical future.

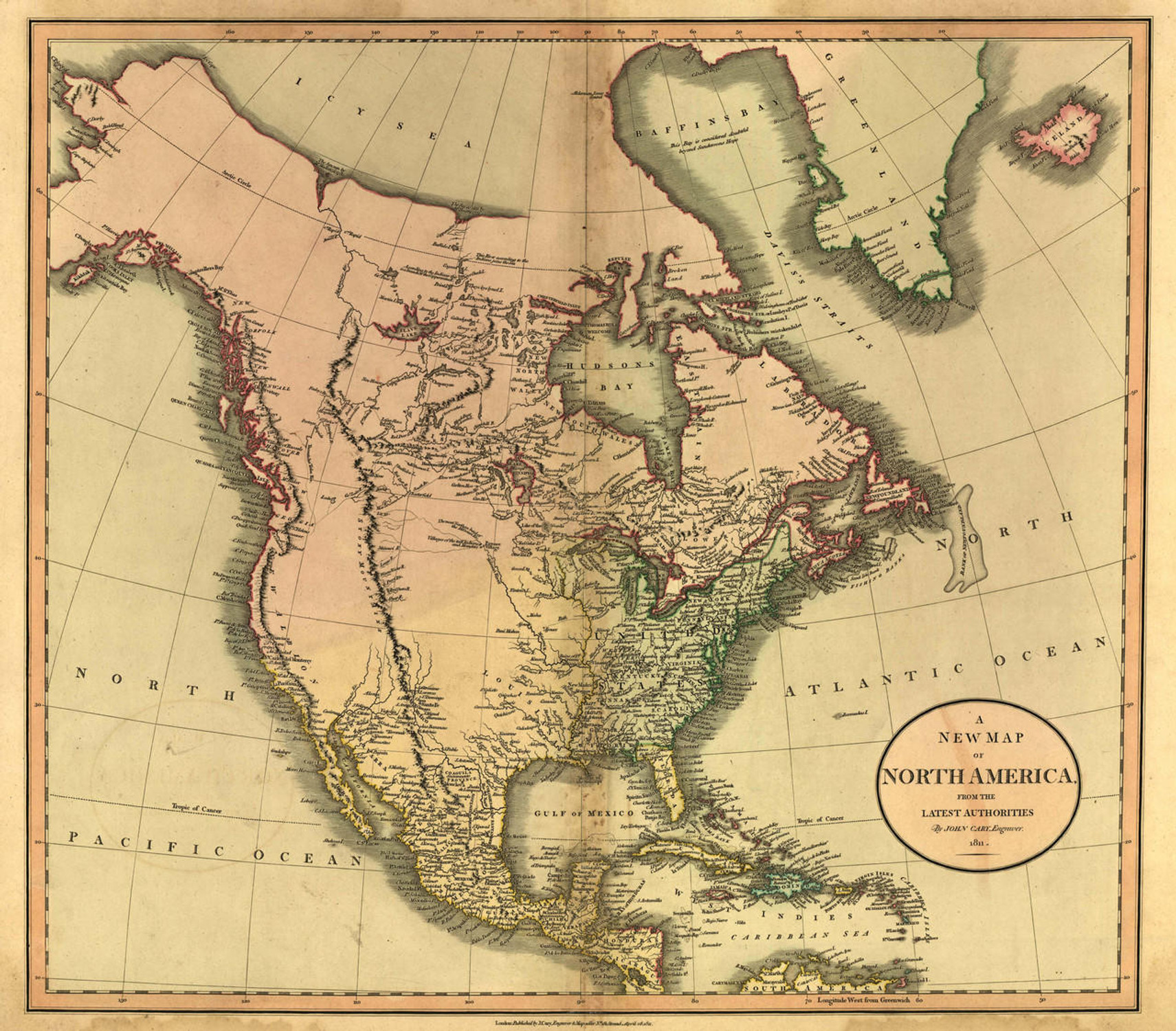
John Cary's 1811 map shows that New Albion covers the whole of the modern U.S. states of California and Oregon.

The New Albion claim was the first indication of English goals broader than simple reprisal against Spain which then influenced similar national expansion projects by others such as Humphrey Gilbert and Walter Raleigh. As a rejection of territorial claims based on papal authority, the New Albion claim asserted Elizabeth's notion of territorial claims via physical presence as opposed to a Papal mandate. This promoted the idea of New Albion as "the back side of Virginia," an expression of England's presumed legal status of sea-to-sea entitlement. The claim occupied a significant place in British geopolitical considerations for centuries and even strengthened Britain's entitlement to the fur trade commerce along the Northwest Coast. Its final influential assertion came in negotiating the Oregon Treaty of 1846 which divided the Oregon Country between Canada and the United States, with the border being along the 49th parallel north to the Pacific.

== Site recognition and identification ==
=== Early identifications ===
Beginning in the 17th century, maps identify Drakes Bay as Drake's landing site. In 1793, George Vancouver studied the site, and concluded it was in Drakes Bay. Professor George Davidson, of the United States Coast and Geodetic Survey, after a study of the narrative and the coast, identified the harbour entered by Drake as Drakes Bay, at Point Reyes, about 30 miles (50 km) north of San Francisco. "Drakes Bay," he reported in 1886, "is a capital harbor in northwest winds, such as Drake encountered. It is easily entered, sheltered by high lands, and a vessel may anchor in three fathoms, close under the shore in good holding ground." Davidson published further support for the Drakes Bay location in 1890 and 1908.

=== 20th century identifications ===
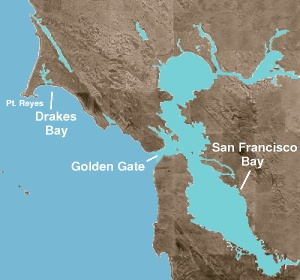
Drakes Bay, northwest of San Francisco

In 1947, following up on work by archaeologists A. L. Kroeber and William W. Elemendorf, archaeologist Robert F. Heizer analyzed the ethnographic reports of Drake's stay at New Albion. Confirming their work Heizer states that "Drake must have landed in territory occupied by the Coast Miwok-speaking natives." In his full analysis, Heizer concludes, "in June 1579, then, Drake probably landed in what is now known as Drake's Bay."

Since 1949, the theory that Drake landed at Drakes Bay has been advocated for by the Drake Navigators Guild in California, and by former president Captain Adolph S. Oko Jr., former honorary chairman Chester W. Nimitz, and former president Raymond Aker. Oko wrote, "Many other correlative facts have been ... found true to the Drake's Cove site as part of the total body of evidence. The weight of evidence truly establishes Drake's Cove as the nodal point of Nova Albion." Nimitz stated that he did "not doubt that in time the public will come to recognize the importance and value of this long-lost site, and will rank it with other National Historic Sites such as Roanoke, Jamestown, and Plymouth." In 1956, Sir Alex A. Cumming, who was the curator of Buckland Abbey, Drake's past home and current museum, also recognised Drake's landing: "That little cove at the mouth of the Estero, sheltered from the wind, protected from the sea and hidden from hostile eyes, must have been a welcome sight, and I believe that Divine Providence guided him to it." In 1978, two time Pulitzer Prize-winning historian Samuel Eliot Morison wrote that "Drakes Bay is correctly so named, that here he spent five weeks, repaired the Golden Hind, sang songs for the Indians, and marched up country."

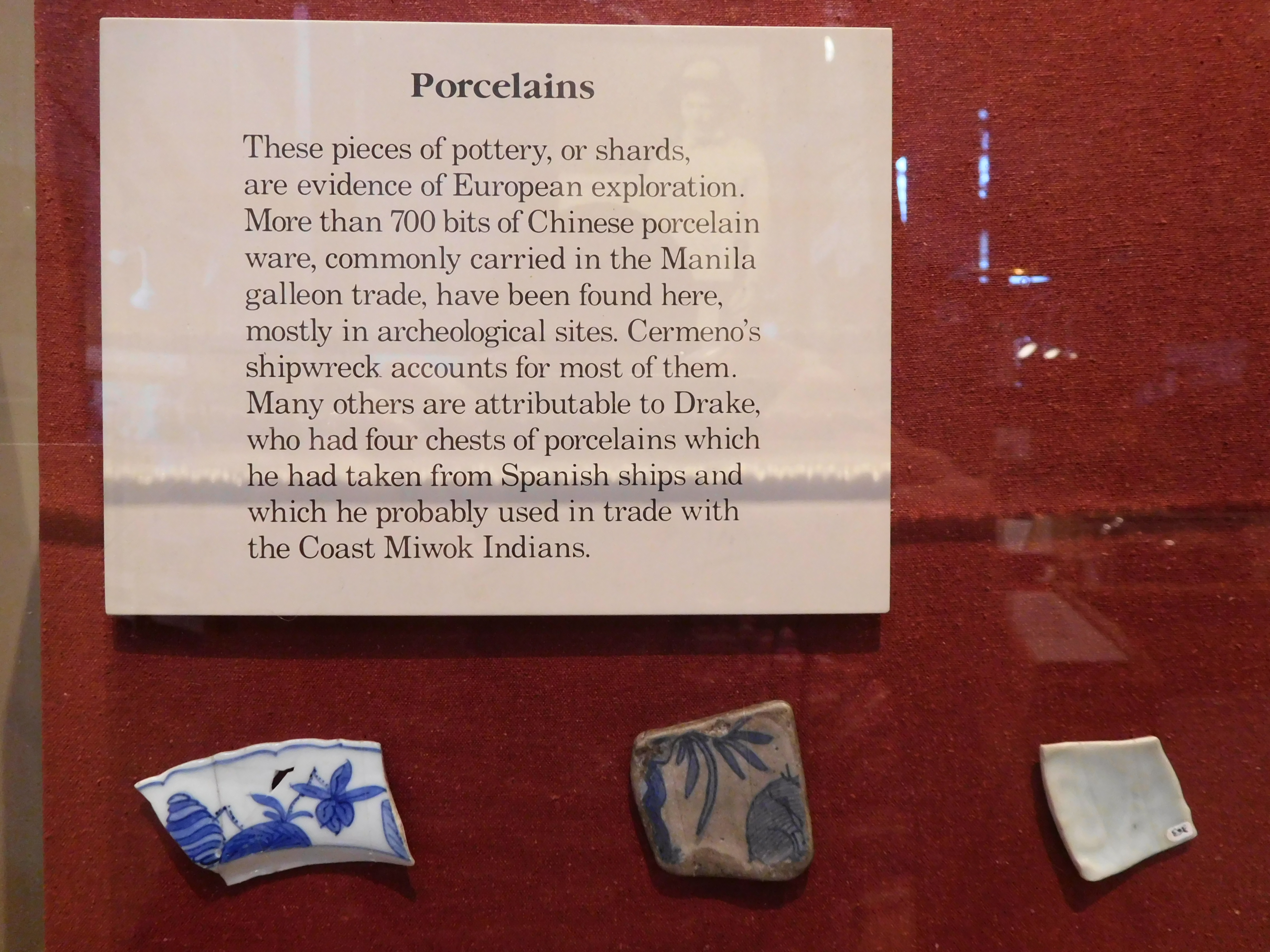
Display at Point Reyes National Seashore Visitor Center of Ming porcelain shards from Drake's 1579 landing and Cermeño's 1595 Manila galleon shipwreck. The Drake shards are distinguished by the sharp breaks and the Cermeño shards by the worn edges due to being surf-tumbled.

Aker conducted detailed studies reconstructing Drake's circumnavigating voyage and advocated for the site at Point Reyes, citing the fact that the official published account placed the colony at 38 degrees north. The geography of Drake's Cove, which lies along the coast of Marin County, has often been suggested as being similar to the cove described by Drake, including the white cliffs that look like the south coast of England and the specific configuration of the Cove. Responding to questions about the geographical fit of the cove, Aker maintained that criticisms—those based on the inconsistent configuration of the sandbars in the cove—were unfounded. He maintained that the configuration of the sandbars in the cove was cyclic over the decades. Accordingly, Aker effectively answered the questions when he predicted that a spit of land that disappeared in 1956—one which closely resembles one on the Hondius map—would reappear. Aker's assertions were confirmed when the spit formed again in 2001.

Artefactual evidence emerged when nearly one hundred pieces of 16th century Chinese export porcelain wares were found in the vicinity of the Drake's Cove site which, according to Clarence Shangraw of the Asian Art Museum of San Francisco and archaeologist Edward Von der Porten, "must fairly be attributed to Francis Drake's Golden Hind visit of 1579." These ceramic samples, found at Point Reyes, are the earliest datable archaeological specimens of Chinese porcelains transported across the Pacific in Manila galleons. The artefacts were found by four different agencies beginning with the University of California, the Drake Navigators Guild, then the Santa Rosa Junior College, and finally San Francisco State College. These porcelain shards are the remains of porcelain dishes Drake took from a Spanish treasure ship in the Pacific. Off-loaded during the careening process and abandoned when Drake sailed from Point Reyes, the porcelain wares were the heaviest items of unknown value that he carried.

The porcelains were first identified by Shangraw and then later by Von der Porten. These researchers specifically distinguished the Drake porcelains, which were found in middens associated with the Coast Miwok, from those of Sebastian Rodriguez Cermeño's San Agustin, the 1595 Manila galleon shipwreck which rests at the floor of Drakes Bay. Unlike the Drake porcelains, shards from the San Augustin wreck had washed onto the Point Reyes shore from the sunken ship's broken structure. Shangraw and Von der Porten were able to differentiate the two cargoes by using such criteria as design, style, quality, and surface wear. The Drake porcelains have clean breaks and show no abrasion from the tumbling action of the surf. In contrast, the Cermeño shards display surf-tumbling, distinct designs, and differences in style and quality—all which suggests two separate cargoes. Drake's purloined cargo included fine porcelain Jingdezhen ware dishes from Jingdezhen, the industrial centre of top quality Chinese porcelain. However, the San Agustin's cargo carried poor quality porcelain wares which were made later by south coast entrepreneurs who were quickly capitalising on a rapidly developing, lucrative market. The San Agustin cargo included pieces from kilns which only began production in about 1590. All of these factors allowed the cargoes to be convincingly distinguished.

=== 21st century identifications ===
Examining the Drake landing site from a nautical perspective, Sir Simon Cassels, Second Sea Lord and Chief of Naval Personnel, Royal Navy, concluded in 2003 that "the weight of evidence... bears heavily on only one and the same site for careening the Golden Hind: the estuary within what for more than 100 years has been named Drakes Bay."

Engaging in scientific research on the Drake and Cermeño sherds by using X-ray fluorescence, Dr. Marco Meniketti of San Jose State University tested ceramics from shipwrecks in Mexico, California, and Oregon as well as porcelains linked to Drake found near Point Reyes. Using varied shipwreck sources to provide strong controls to the research, Meniketti's findings support the conclusion that the Cermeño porcelains and the Drake ceramics are from two different ships. He states that these two cargoes can be distinguished based on differences in their key elements and believes these differences may represent changes in glaze chemistry, clay sources, or unique inclusions or tempering. Aker maintained that those porcelain sherds that washed onto shore must be attributed to Cermeño, and those with clean breaks and no water wear must be attributed to Drake.

- Drakes Bay National Historic and Archeological District National Historic Landmark
- U.S. National Register of Historic Places
- U.S. National Historic Landmark
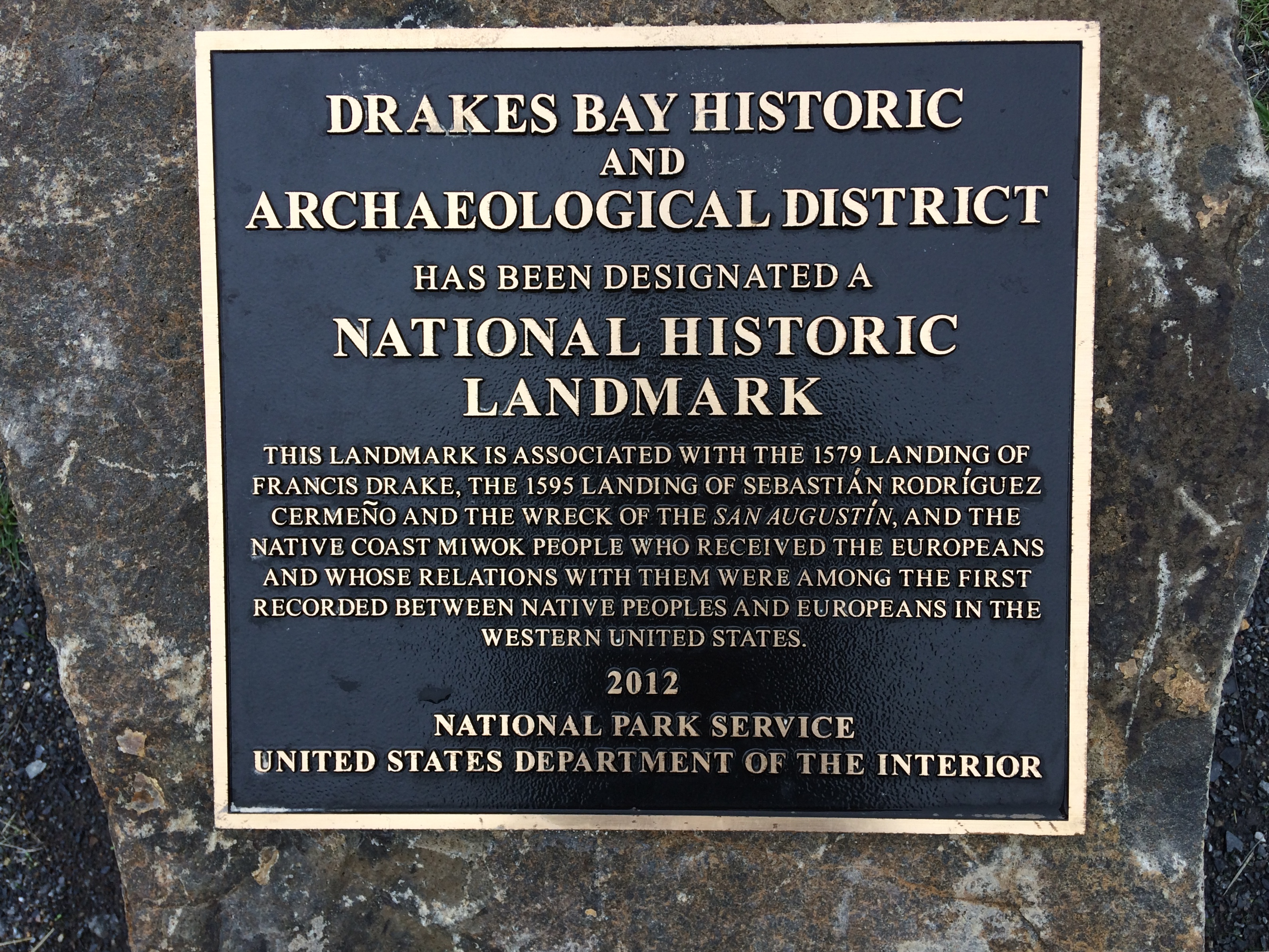
- Location: Marin County, California
- NRHP reference No.: 12001006
- Added to NRHP: October 16, 2012

Historian Dr. John Sugden, after reviewing numerous proposed Drake landing sites, observed, "No aspect of Drake's career has suffered more false leads than the site of Nova Albion." Sugden concludes that "the evidence overwhelmingly favours Drake's Estero in Drakes Bay" and that "it is high time the United States register of National Historic Landmarks officially recognized Drake's Estero as the Elizabethan anchorage."

=== Official recognition ===
The site of Drake's landing as officially recognised by the U.S. Department of the Interior and other agencies is Drake's Cove. The cove is located in Drakes Estero which trends northerly off Drakes Bay. The site lies in Marin County, California, near Point Reyes, just north of the Golden Gate, at 38°02′05″N 122°56′26″W. On 16 October 2012, Secretary of the Interior Ken Salazar signed the nomination and on 17 October 2012, the Drakes Bay Historic and Archaeological District was formally announced as a new National Historic Landmark. The marker was placed at 38°1′41″N 122°53′2″W. One report referred to the site as the most likely site for Drake's landing. No Drake anchorage has endured so much scrutiny nor seen the amount of field study and research as has this location.

This distinction endorses the district's artefactual evidence as of one of the earliest instances of interaction between native people and European explorers on the west coast of the current United States of America. This distinction is based on two historical encounters: Sir Francis Drake's 1579 California landing and Golden Hind anchorage and Sebastian Rodriguez Cermeño's landing and San Agustin, his 1595 Manila galleon shipwreck.

In October 2021, the California State Parks Director Armando Quintero designated Site of New Albion as California Historical Landmark number 1061. The 215 acre location, identified as Drake's Cove, is all within the boundaries of Point Reyes National Seashore. The state's Office of Historic Preservation states, "New Albion is the landing site and encampment of Sir Francis Drake's expedition to California in 1579, located in the coast of Marin County," and specifies several notable events associated with the landmark: "Includes sites of Drake's fort, the careening of the Golden Hind, the abandonment of Tello's bark, and the meetings with the Coast Miwok peoples".

That the Coast Miwok people's first contact with Europeans was with Sir Francis Drake is also recognised by the Federated Indians of Graton Rancheria, a federation of Coast Miwok and Southern Pomo people which has been officially sanctioned by the United States Congress. Additionally, the Coast Miwok Tribal Council of Marin—organized under the Indian Self-Determination and Education Assistance Act of 1975—acknowledges the 1579 contact with Drake by their lineal ancestors, the Indigenous Marin Coast Miwok people.

Both the Oregon State Parks and Oregon Historical Society support that Drake anchored at Cape Arago and then sailed south to seek a suitable careenage site for Golden Hind.

=== Ideas suggesting alternative locations ===
Considering that in excess of thirty other locations have been advanced as the site of Drake's port, more information has been printed regarding the location of New Albion than any other New World harbour that Drake sought. Davidson recognises an abundance of confusion from armchair historians, including Samuel Johnson and Jules Verne, and attributes the confusion to their lack of seamanship experience and navigational knowledge.

One such location is San Francisco Bay, California. Robert H. Power, co-owner of the Nut Tree in Vacaville, California, promoted the idea that Drake's New Albion was inside present-day San Francisco Bay, specifically near Point San Quentin (37°56′22″N 122°29′12″W). Among his arguments was that the Hondius Broadside map matched a part of the topography when parts were adjusted using a 2:1 correction.

In 2003 Canadian R. Samuel Bawlf suggested that Drake's landing was on present-day Vancouver Island at Comox, British Columbia (49°40′N 124°57′W). Bawlf supported the idea that Drake careened Golden Hind in Whale Cove, Oregon, and he pointed to a number of pieces of evidence in support of his view that the official published record of Drake's voyage was deliberately altered to suppress the true extent of his discoveries.

== Speculation of a colony ==
A counting discrepancy of Golden Hind crew members has led to speculation that Drake left behind men to form a colony. The idea that Drake formed a colony is, however, suspect—it is improbable that Drake would have left settlers at New Albion since he had not equipped the voyage for colonization. Drake was also undoubtedly aware that England would have trouble enforcing its claim by supporting a nascent colony in a land so remote as New Albion and would have likely avoided planting such an English outpost. Additionally, the only person specifically reported as left behind at New Albion was N. de Morena, a European ship pilot who was in ill health. Spanish sources state that he was left ashore, recovered his health, and eventually embarked on a successful four-year journey by walking to Mexico, where he reported to authorities.

The counting discrepancy, a difference of at least 20 men, concerns the number of crew Drake commanded before his stay in Northern California as compared to crew tallies when he reached the Moluccas, an archipelago in the Banda Sea, Indonesia. Released Spanish prisoners stated that, off the coast of Central America, the ship's company was about 80 men. Sir Francis Drake's cousin and crew member, John Drake, claimed the number totaled 60 when the ship was at Ternate in the Moluccas. On Vesuvius Reef, The World Encompassed puts the number at 58. All notions of an embryo colony are primarily based on these numbers, and the reason for this discrepancy remains unknown.

== Plate of Brass hoax ==
In the 1900s, a hoax was perpetrated regarding the brass plate which Drake had posted at New Albion. English historian Richard Hakluyt wrote details of the distinctive original plate:

At our departure hence our General set up a monument of our being there, as also of her Majesty's right and title to the same; namely a plate, nailed upon a fair great post, whereupon was engraved her Majesty's name, the day and year of our arrival there, with the free giving up of the province and people into her Majesty's hands, together with her Highness' picture and arms, in a piece of six pence of current English money, under the plate, whereunder was also written the name of our General.

The original plate—which served as tangible notice of England's sovereignty over the land—has yet to be found. Consequently, the exact location of the monument erected by Drake is unknown.

In 1936, a counterfeit, known as Drake's Plate of Brass, came to public attention, and for decades its discovery was widely believed to be that of the original. While it was accepted as authentic by the University of California, Berkeley, doubts persisted. Eventually, in the late 1970s, metallurgical tests showed that this supposed original plate could not have been made in the 1500s, and scientists determined that the plate was a modern creation. In 2003, it was publicly revealed that the counterfeit plate was created as a practical joke among local historians. Spinning out of control, the joke unintentionally became a public hoax and embarrassment to those who had once confirmed its authenticity.

== See also ==
- Oregon Country
- Fort Astoria
- Prayer Book Cross
- Sir Francis Drake Boulevard
- Charter of 1606
- History of the west coast of North America
- Drake in California
- Age of Discovery
