= Francis Fletcher (priest) =

English priest and explorer

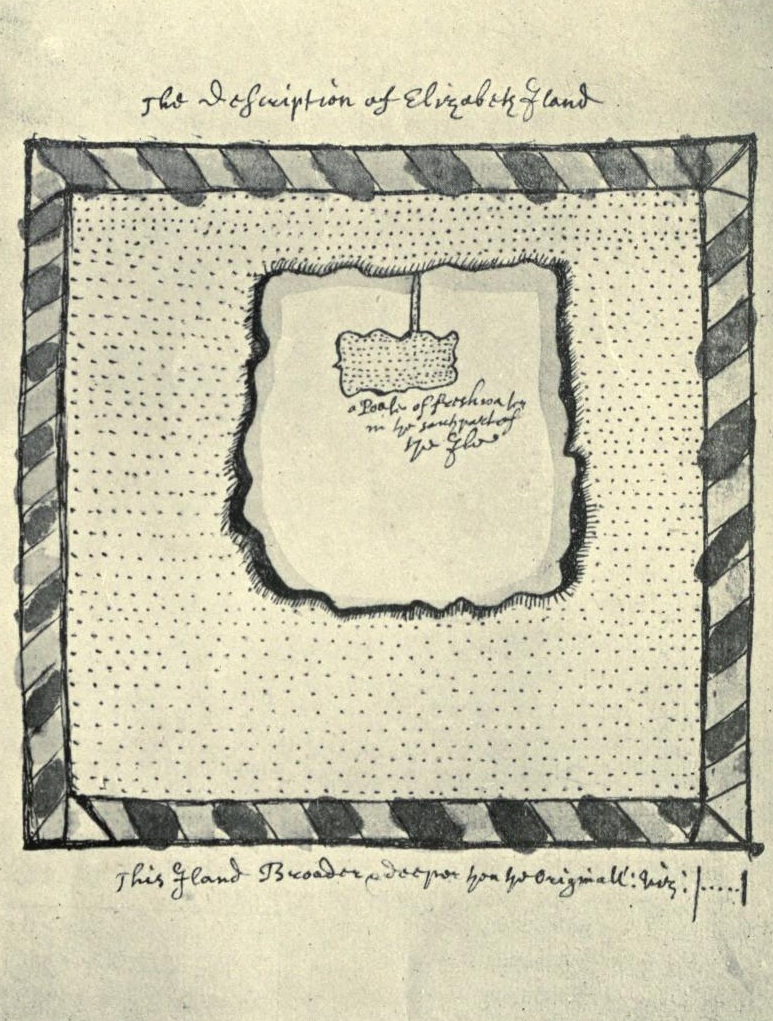
Fletcher's map of Elizabeth Island off Cape Horn

Francis Fletcher (c. 1555 – c. 1619) was a priest of the Church of England who accompanied Sir Francis Drake on his circumnavigation of the world from 1577 to 1580 and kept a written account of it.

== Life ==
Much is known about Fletcher's three years of voyaging around the world with Drake, but there is little certain information about the rest of his life. John Venn identified Fletcher with a man of this name who entered Pembroke College, Cambridge, in 1574, but did not take a degree. He was briefly Rector of St Mary Magdalen, Milk Street, a parish of the City of London, resigning in July 1576 to join Drake in his preparation of a fleet for purposes which are still disputed. He acted as Drake's chaplain during the three-year voyage which ensued, keeping a journal of their adventures which he handed to Drake on the expedition's return to England in 1580.

In September 1578, Drake's own ship, the Golden Hind, passed the Strait of Magellan amid storms, and Fletcher recorded that the ship was driven to the "utmost island of Terra Incognita". He made a map of "Elizabeth Iland" (pictured), which Fletcher and Drake claimed for England, naming it Elizabeth Island.

Fletcher was sometimes at odds with Drake. In a sermon he preached to the expedition in January 1580, Fletcher suggested that their ships' recent woes had resulted from the unjust death of Thomas Doughty, whom Drake had ordered to be beheaded on 2 July 1578. After the sermon, Drake had Fletcher chained to a hatch cover, then "solemnly excommunicated him".

Venn states that Fletcher was Rector of Bradenham in Buckinghamshire from 1579 to 1592, but a later writer, David B. Quinn, points out that Fletcher was still overseas in 1579 and believes Venn has confused him with a man named Richard Fletcher. In 1593 Fletcher became Vicar of Tickhill, Yorkshire, and in 1605 he married Margaret Gallard, a widow. He may have died in 1619, when another man was appointed to his church benefice.

Fletcher's log of Drake's voyage formed the basis of The World Encompassed by Sir Francis Drake, an account of the voyage published in London in 1628 at the instigation of Drake's nephew, another Francis Drake. A copy of the first part of Fletcher's journal was made by a man named John Conyers, described as "Citizen and Apothecary of London", about 1677, and this survives in the British Library, catalogued as "Sloane MS 61, Francis Fletcher's Log".

== In popular culture ==
Fletcher is portrayed by Roger Adamson in the film Drake's Venture (1980).
