= Nuno da Silva (navigator) =

Portuguese explorer

- Born: c. 1550; Porto, Kingdom of Portugal
- Died: unknown unknown
- Occupation: Navigator
- Known for: Accompanied Sir Francis Drake during his circumnavigation voyage (1577–1580)

Nuno da Silva (aka Nunno da Silva; born c. 1550) was a Portuguese pilot and navigator in the 16th century, who accompanied Sir Francis Drake during his circumnavigation voyage (1577–1580). Da Silva was captured by Drake at the Island of Santiago in Cape Verde, after which he guided Drake’s expedition through parts of the Atlantic and along the Pacific coast of the Americas. Da Silva was abandoned by Drake at Huatulco, on the Pacific coast of what was then New Spain, on 13 April 1579. However, Drake would later credit da Silva's service with the success of his mission. His memoirs of Drake's voyage remain a valuable historical resource.

== Biography ==
=== Early life ===
Nuno Da Silva was born in Porto, Portugal, sometime in the mid-16th century.

=== Capture by Francis Drake ===
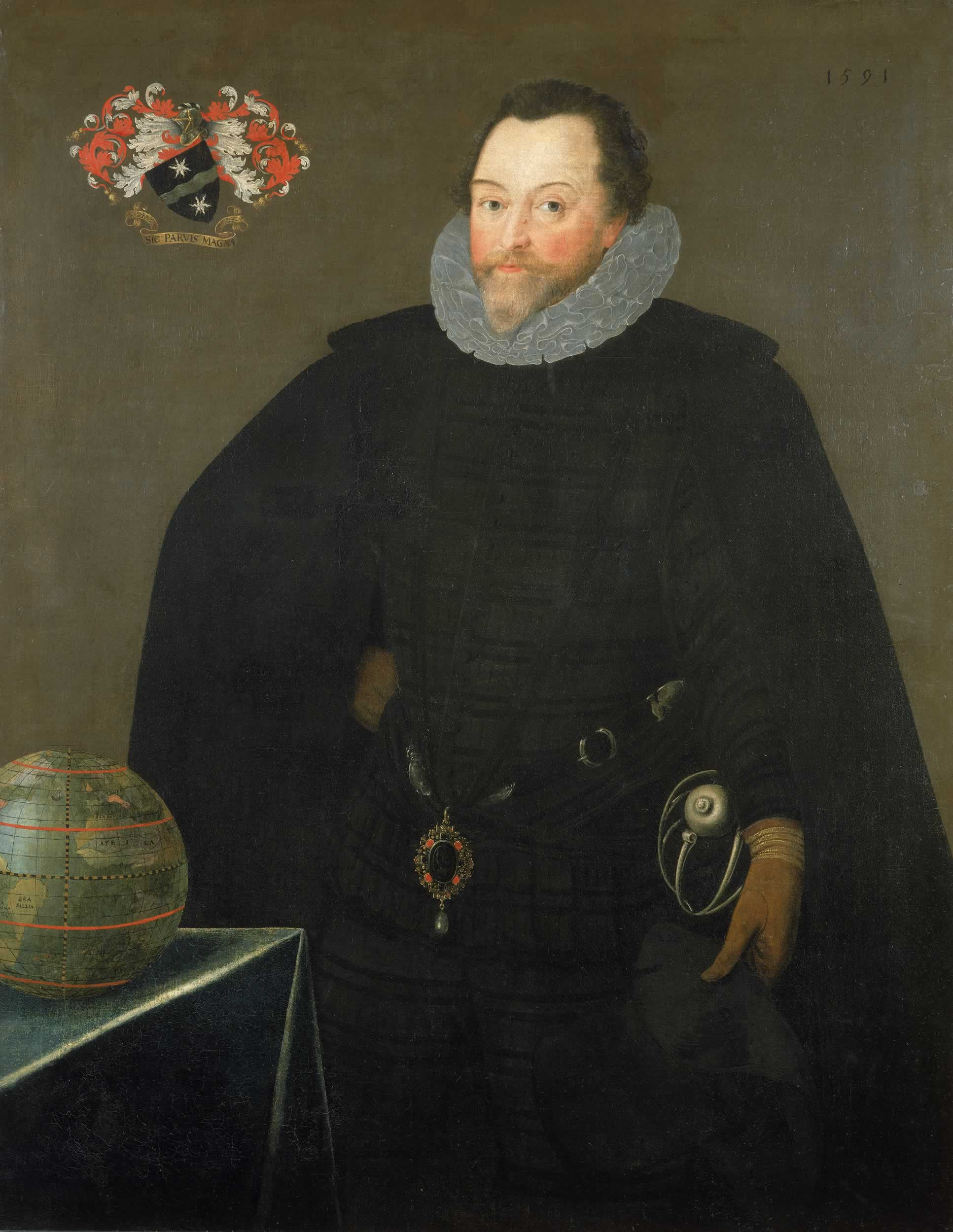
Gheeraerts Francis Drake 1591

On 30 January 1578 Francis Drake's expedition captured the Portuguese merchant ship Santa Maria (later renamed Mary) off Santiago, in the Cape Verde Islands. Aboard was the Portuguese pilot Nuno da Silva. Drake retained da Silva for his navigational expertise, hoping Silva could guide the expedition further, thanks to his knowledge of the coast of Brazil.

As pilot, Nuno da Silva guided the fleet through the Straits of Magellan, and aided Drake in navigating the western coast of South America (Peru and neighbouring regions) during the expedition’s Pacific phase. He also contributed to the knowledge of coasts, winds, and latitudes encountered during the voyage. The Portuguese sailor Lopez Vaz wrote that da Silva provided "great helpe and furtherance unto Francis Drake".

During the voyage Da Silva kept a log which remains a valuable historical resource. da Silva wrote of Drake in his memoirs: "Francis Drake wrote a book in which he entered his navigation and in which he delineated birds, trees and sea lions. He is adept at painting and has with him a boy, a relation of his [his cousin, John Drake], who is a great painter. When they both shut themselves up in his cabin they were both painting".

Da Silva was abandoned by Drake at Huatulco, on the Pacific coast of what was then New Spain, in 13 April 1579, his navigational services being no longer of significant use. Despite having abandoned his navigator, Drake would later credit da Silva with the success of his mission, having provided "greate helpe and furtherance" to the expedition. Da Silva was captured by the Spanish and interrogated under torture.

== Legacy ==
Nuno da Silva was played by Alan Downer in the 1980 Television film Drake's Venture, produced by Westward Television.

== See also ==
- Circumnavigation of the Earth
