= Whale Cove (Oregon) =

Cove in Oregon, United States

Coordinates: 44°47′19″N 124°4′17″W

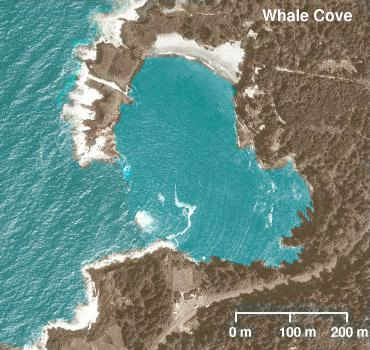
Whale Cove, south of Depoe Bay, Oregon, colorized aerial photograph

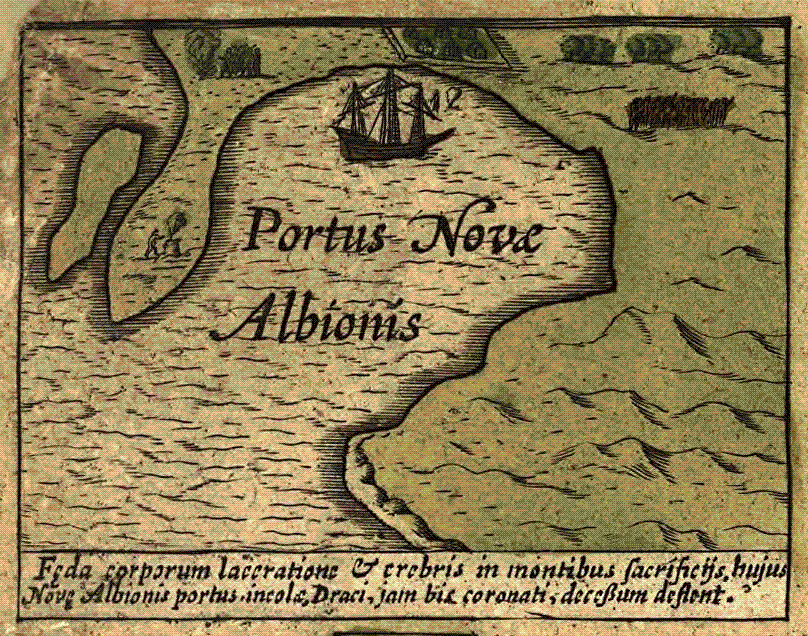
The Jonucus Hondius map of 1589 of Drake's New Albion cove

Whale Cove is a small cove, approximately one-third of a mile (0.54 km) in diameter, located on the Pacific Coast of Oregon in the United States, approximately 1.4 mi (2.3 km) south of the city of Depoe Bay. The cove is located at approximately 44 deg 44 min N latitude.

The ocean portion of the cove is protected as a marine reserve, and land portions of the cove are protected as parts of Rocky Creek State Scenic Viewpoint and Oregon Islands National Wildlife Refuge.

== Central Oregon Drake landing theory ==
British amateur historian Bob Ward first proposed in 1998 that Whale Cove was the location where Francis Drake spent portion of the summer of 1579 careening his boat during his circumnavigation undertaking. The location of Drake's landing, at which he claimed a portion of the west coast of North America as "New Albion", has gained the most support over the years among more than twenty other alternative sites compiled in Fringe theories on the location of New Albion. The Drake northern California landing theory careening site was officially recognized in 2012 and is located at the Drakes Bay Historic and Archaeological District National Landmark on the coast of Marin County. Canadian Sam Bawlf added his support for Whale Cove careening site in his 2003 book "The Secret Voyage". Archeologist/historian Melissa Darby did similar in her 2019 book "Thunder Go North".

Ward proposed Whale Cove as the actual spot of Drake's landing based on its similarity to a 16th-century map made by Jodocus Hondius. Ward theorized that Drake may have conspired with Queen Elizabeth I to mislead the Spanish about the true location of the cove to keep the Spanish from discovering Puget Sound, which Ward believes that Drake thought was the Northwest Passage. By 1998, Drake biographer Harry Kelsey warned about the integrity of the final Hakluyt narrative hindered by the well established fact that the "English authorities had determined to keep details of the voyage secret after Drake returned. []To accomplish their goal, English authorities gave out a series of changing and conflicting accounts".

One longstanding puzzling feature of the Hondius map is the small island on the peninsula protecting the cove. According to Ward, a narrow strip of the peninsula protecting Whale Cove "has a strip through which water flows at high tide" turning 80% of the peninsula into an island. Melissa Darby was adding much later on: "The water is shallow over the reef. Over the last 430 years the direct force of the prevailing ocean waves and possible subduction from the 1700 earthquake has reduced this reef, but whether it was a rocky inlet just above sea level in Drake's day and drawn on the Portus illustration can only be conjectured."

Unlike the Point Reyes northern California and the Nehalem Bay central Oregon landing theories, the Whale Cove landing theory has not identified where the Drake narrative nearby "Islands of Saint-James" would be located nowadays. The Whale Cove nearby sealing and birding sites are reefs (e.g. Gull Rock, Otter Rock and Full Rock) and never got the protection status of wildlife refuge from overhunting such as the Farallon Islands and Three Arch Rocks. The geographical coastal marker where the expedition resupplied with seals and birds before resuming circumnavigation is important to locate as the narrative is less subject to obfuscation or interpretation.

== Navigation ==
Whale Cove is navigable only by an experienced crew: mariners are advised to stay at least 600 yards (550 m) offshore for the distance one mile north of Whale Cove to one mile south of Whale Cove. Though it was frequently used by smugglers to bring in Canadian whiskey during prohibition, Whale Cove is not considered a usable bay in most seasons, though in summer it can be calm with few breakers. Whale Cove was once known as Bootlegger Bay for being "small and dangerous for mariners", therefore "perfect for rumrunners smuggling Canadian whiskey into the Northwest".
