= Mateo Martinic =

Chilean historian

Mateo Martinić Beroš
- Born: October 20, 1931 (age 95); Punta Arenas, Chile
- Occupations: Historian, politician, lawyer
- Known for: Studies on the history of the Magallanes Region
- Awards: National History Award (2000)

Mateo Martinić Beroš (born 20 October 1931) is a Chilean historian, politician and lawyer of Croatian descent.

Martinic was born in Punta Arenas into a family of Croatian immigrants from the island of Brač in Dalmatia and completed his primary and secondary education at Liceo San José in Punta Arenas.

He has primarily dealt with the history of the Magallanes Region. He entered the University of Chile in 1953 studying briefly pedagogy before moving on to study law and then continued his law studies in the Catholic University of Chile. From 1964 to 1970 he served as intendant of Magallanes Region. He became a lawyer in 1983.

Together with botanist Edmundo Pisano Martnic was among the founding members of Instituto de la Patagonia which in 1985 became integrated into the University of Magallanes.

Martnic received the National History Award in 2000. He was named Doctor Honoris Causa by the University of Magallanes in 2001 and received the Bicentennial Award in 2006 from the Chilean Cultural Heritage Corporation, the University of Chile and the Bicentennial Commission of the Government of Chile.

== Bibliography ==
- Patagonia, materia y espíritu (1970)
- Presencia de Chile en la Patagonia Austral: 1843-1879 (1971)
- Reseña del descubrimiento y de la evolución cartográfica de la Región Magallánica (1971)
- Magallanes, síntesis de tierra y gentes (1972)
- Crónica de las tierras del sur del canal Beagle (1974) and (2005) (second revised and expanded edition)
- Origen y desarrollo de Punta Arenas entre 1848-1898 (1974)
- Recorriendo Magallanes Antiguo con Theodor Ohlsen (1975) and (2005)
- Historia del Estrecho de Magallanes (1977)
- La inmigración yugoeslava en Magallanes (1978)
- Patagonia de ayer y de hoy (1980)
- Los alemanes en Magallanes (1981)
- La Tierra de los Fuegos: historia, geografía, sociedad, economía (1982) and (2009)
- Última Esperanza en el tiempo (1983) and (2000)
- La individualidad geográfica de la tierra magallánica en el Reino de Chile (1985)
- Magallanes de antaño (1985)
- Nogueira el pionero (1986)
- Punta Arenas en su primer medio siglo: 1848-1898 (1988)
- Magallanes 1921-1952: inquietud y crisis (1988)
- Historia de la Región Magallánica (1992) and (2006) (second revised and expanded edition)
- Historia del petróleo en Magallanes (1993) and (2005)
- Los aónikenk: historia y cultura (1995)
- Faros del Estrecho de Magallanes (co-authored with Julio Fernández Mallo) (1996)
- Punta Arenas sesquicentenaria (1848-1998): una visión de su evaluación de década en década (1999)
- La inmigración croata en Magallanes (1999)
- Cartografía Magallánica: 1523-1945 (1999)
- Rey Don Felipe. Acontecimientos históricos (2000)
- Menéndez y Braun: prohombres patagónicos (2001)
- Breve historia de Magallanes (2002)
- Marinos de a caballo: exploraciones terrestres de la Armada de Chile en la Patagonia Austral y la Tierra del Fuego. 1877-1897 (2002)
- Río Verde: su historia y su gente (co-authored with Alfredo Prieto, Manuel Arroyo and Rodrigo Cárdenas) (2002) and (2011)
- Estrecho de Magallanes: puerta de Chile (co-authored with Mónica Oportot) (2003)
- Mujeres magallánicas (2003)
- Archipiélago Patagónico: la última frontera (2004)
- De la Trapananda al Áysen (2005)
- Los alemanes en la Patagonia Chilena (2005)
- Los británicos en la Región Magallánica (2007)
- Las comunicaciones a distancia en Magallanes: su evolución a lo largo del tiempo (co-authored with Claudio Buratovic) (2007)
- Plüschow y Dreblow: águilas alemanas en el cielo austral (2008)
- La medicina en Magallanes (2009)
- El carbón en Magallanes: historia y futuro (2010)
- Palacio Sara Braun: ícono patrimonial de Punta Arenas (co-authored with Dante Baeriswyl) (2010)
- Monseñor Giacomini: paladín de magallanidad (2011)
- El occidente fueguino: todavía una incógnita (2011)
- A la hora del crepúsculo: recuerdos de un hombre común (2011)
- Bio-bibliografía (2011)
- Testimonios de Magallanes: miradas entrecruzadas (co-authored with Patricia Arancibia Clavel) (2012)

== Toponymy ==
Lago Mateo Martinic Cordillera Darwin, Tierra del Fuego 54°45′00″S 69°22′00″W Expedición Neozelandesa a la Tierra del Fuego 1971-72 Homologado por el Instituto Geográfico Militar Carta Nacional de Chile escala 1:500.000, Hoja "Punta Arenas" 5300-6800, edición 1975 (1971).

Cerro Martinic (Southern Patagonian Ice Field, sector SE) Expedición Francesa Andes de Patagonie 1982-83 Enfer Blanc de Patagonie (Editions Fernand Nathan, Paris, 1985).

Isla Martinic (Murray Channel, Puerto Corriente) Servicio Hidrografía y Oceanografía de la Armada de Chile. Resolución SHOA Ordinario N°13.042/7/30/VRS de 17-XI-2008 y Carta N°13123 "Puerto Corriente", escala 1:15.000, edición diciembre 2008.

== Sources ==
- Mateo Martinic Beros (1931-), Memoria Chilena.
- Obras de Mateo Martinic digitalizadas en Memoria Chilena
- Sitio oficial del Instituto de la Patagonia
- Origen y desarrollo del Instituto de la Patagonia. Una perspectiva de 40 años. Editorial de Mateo Martinic. Anales del Instituto de la Patagonia. v.37. n.1. Punta Arenas. 2009.
- Publicaciones de la Universidad de Magallanes
- Revista Magallania (versión online)
- Nuestro.cl: Mateo Martinic: Premio Bicentenario 2006.
- Nuestro.cl: La magallanidad de Chile. Discurso pronunciado por Mateo Martinic en la ceremonia de entrega del Premio Bicentenario 2006.
