= The World Encompassed =

1628 book

The World Encompassed by Sir Francis Drake
- Author: Sir Francis Drake, 1st Baronet
- Published: 1628
- Publisher: N. Bourne
- Publication place: England

The World Encompassed by Sir Francis Drake is the earliest detailed account of Francis Drake's circumnavigation. It was compiled by Drake's nephew, also named Francis Drake, based on his uncle's journal, the notes of Francis Fletcher, and other sources. It was first published in London in 1628 by Nicholas Bourne.

The book gives an account of life at sea and privateering against Spanish ships and settlements, and provides detailed descriptions of various peoples encountered by the expedition It was also published with newly produced maps based on the discoveries of the voyage.
