= Martín Ignacio de Loyola =

Roman Catholic bishop

Most Reverend Martín Ignacio de Loyola
- Bishop of Paraguay
- Church: Catholic Church
- Diocese: Diocese of Paraguay
- In office: 1601–1606
- Predecessor: Thomas Vásquez de Liaño
- Successor: Reginaldo de Lizárraga

Orders
- Consecration: 1602 by Juan Bautista Acevedo Muñoz

Personal details
- Born: c. 1550 Eibar, Guipuzcoa, Spain
- Died: 1606 Buenos Aires

Martín Ignacio Martínez de Mallea, known as Martín Ignacio de Loyola (c. 1550 – 1606), was a Franciscan friar, best known for his two travels around the world in 1580–1584 and 1585–1589, being the first person to complete the world circumnavigation twice in different directions^{A}, and for his missionary effort in China.

== Life ==
He was born c. 1550 in Eibar. He was a grandnephew of Ignatius of Loyola, and was ordained a priest in Alaejos in 1572.

He died in 1606 in Buenos Aires.

== Circumnavigations of the world ==
In both of his travels Loyola took advantage of Spain and Portugal being united under the crown of Philip II of Spain.

=== First circumnavigation: 1582–1584 ===
Loyola's first circumnavigation was made in a westerly direction.

Departing Cádiz on 21 June 1582, he sailed to the Canary Islands, crossed the Atlantic to La Désirade, Puerto Rico, and Santo Domingo, before arriving in San Juan de Ulúa (today in Veracruz), in Mexico. After crossing to the Pacific Ocean coast of Mexico at Acapulco he sailed to the Mariana Islands, and the Philippines, before eventually reaching the Empire of China, where he landed in Fujian province. There he and his companions were considered to be spies and were sent to Guangzhou. After a year they were set free and sent to Macau. After travelling on to Japan, he returned to Lisbon via the Straits of Malacca, Portuguese India, the Cape of Good Hope and Saint Helena.

Loyola's account of his first journey around the world was first published in Rome in 1585, included in Juan González de Mendoza's Historia de las cosas más notables, ritos y costumbres del gran reyno dela China.

=== Second circumnavigation: 1585–1589 ===
Loyola's second circumnavigation was made in an easterly direction.

It is not clear how or when Loyola made his eastward journey to China. In 1587 he left Macau, China, and crossed the Pacific Ocean to Acapulco, Mexico, in a ship commanded by Pedro de Unamuno. From there he crossed Mexico to Veracruz, and then crossed the Atlantic to Spain.

== Other journeys ==
In 1595, six years after his second return to Spain, he went to Paraguay, that he reached via Panama, Peru, and Chile – whose Spanish governor by then, Martín García de Loyola, was his cousin – and Río de la Plata.

He went back to Spain again in 1600 and returned to Paraguay in 1603, this time as Bishop of Asunción. He had been consecrated as such in Valladolid by Juan Bautista Acevedo Muñoz, Bishop of Valladolid, the year before.

== See also ==
- Jesuit China missions
- First Synod of Asunción
- List of circumnavigations
- Circumnavigation
- Pedro Cubero
- Pedro Ordóñez de Ceballos

== Notes ==
^AFirst overall was Maestre Anes.

== External links and additional sources ==
- Cheney, David M. "Archdiocese of Asunción". Catholic-Hierarchy.org. (for Chronology of Bishops) ^{[self-published]}
- Chow, Gabriel. "Metropolitan Archdiocese of Asunción (Paraguay)". GCatholic.org. (for Chronology of Bishops) ^{[self-published]}
- Santos, Hector. "The characters on the galleon Esperanza" in Sulat sa Tansô. US, April 3, 1997.

Catholic Church titles
| Preceded by Thomas Vásquez de Liaño | Bishop of Paraguay; 1601–1608 | Succeeded by Reginaldo de Lizárraga |
