= Pedro Cubero =

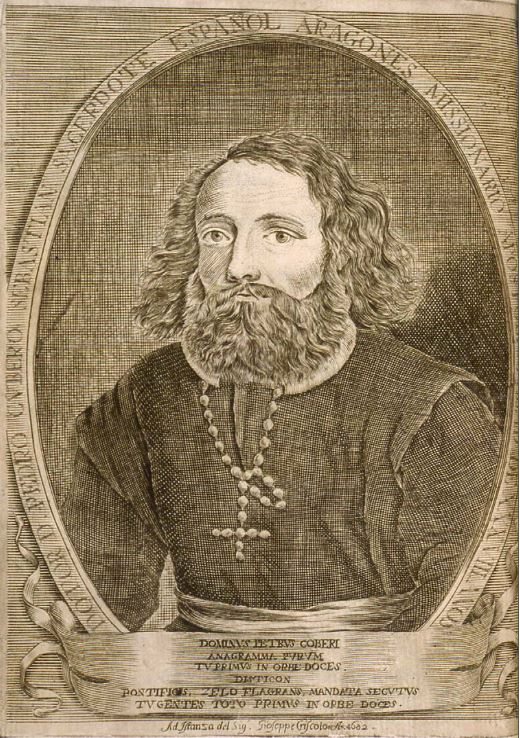
1682 Cubero portrait.

Pedro Cubero Sebastián (El Frasno, Spain, 1645 – 1700) was a Spanish priest, best known for his eastwards travel around the world from 1670 to 1679. He was one of the most widely traveled men in his time.

Pedro Cubero was born in the village of El Frasno, near to Calatayud, in the Spanish region of Aragón. He studied in Zaragoza and Salamanca, up to his ordination as a priest in Zaragoza, and soon afterwards went to Rome, where he joined the Propaganda Fide congregation.

== Around the world ==
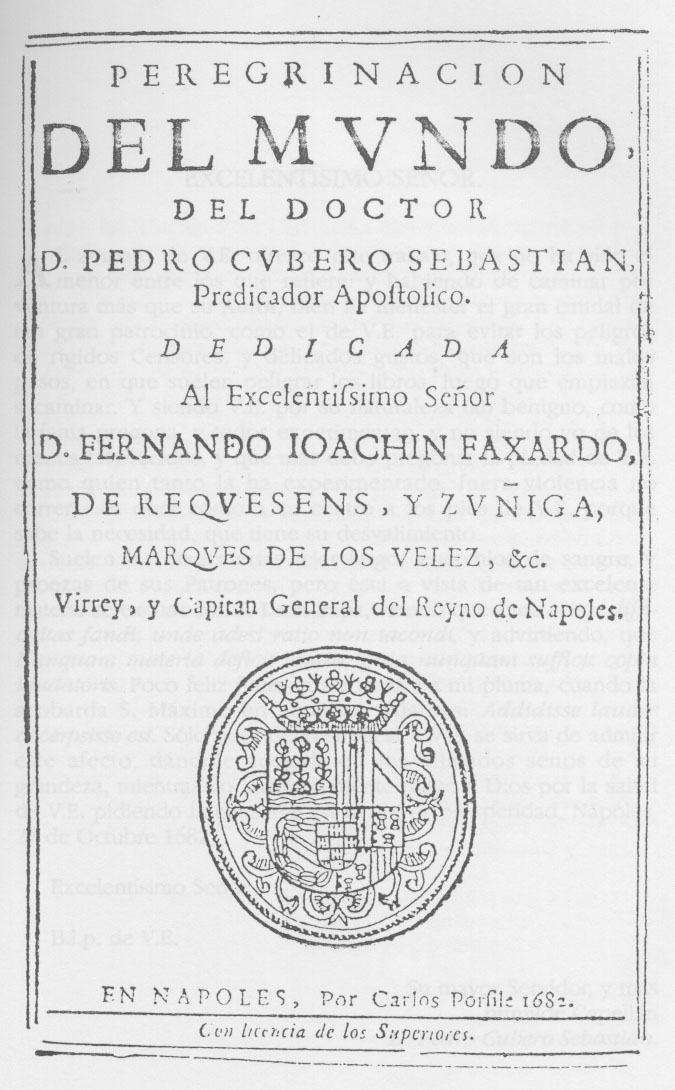
Title page of the second edition of Peregrinación del mundo (1682)

In accordance with his missionary work, he undertook in 1670 a journey to East Asia, that eventually led him to complete an eastwards around the world trip. This was the first such journey that included a considerable amount of overland travel. He travelled through Western and Eastern Europe, Western and Central Asia, and North America. Gemelli Careri undertook a similar voyage twenty years later.

In Europe Cubero visited Paris, Venice, Istanbul, Warsaw, where he attended the enthronement of John III Sobieski, Vilna, and Moscow where he met Nicolae Milescu who acted as Cubero's interpreter in the presence of tzar Alexis of Russia. In Asia he visited Astrakhan, Isfahan, Qazvin, where he was received by Shah Suleiman of Persia, Bandar Abbass, Surat, Goa, Colombo, Mylapore, Malacca, the Philippines and Moluccas. In the Americas he visited Acapulco, Veracruz, Havana before returning to Cádiz.

=== Vicissitudes in Far East ===
While sailing from Colombo to Mylapore Cubero was captured by Malabar pirates and enslaved in the Maldive Islands for a few months. In Malacca, he was put in jail by the Dutch Governor, accused of publicly preaching Catholicism.

Once in the Philippines, a Spanish colony, he realized that he was not very welcomed, as he did not belong to any of the Religious Orders that monopolized the missionary work. While in Manila he suffered the big earthquake of November 29, 1677. He went for a while to Tidore, despite the recent withdrawal of the Spanish forces there, and it is not clear if he actually entered China however he later dedicated three very detailed chapters of his Peregrinación del Mundo to China, Tartary and the Chinese-Tartarian wars.

=== Aboard the Manila galleon ===
As he felt somehow passed over in the Philippines, he eventually decided to proceed to New Spain. He crossed the Pacific Ocean in the 1678 sailing of the Manila galleon, that time a carrack named San Antonio de Padua commanded by Don Felipe Montemayor y Prado. The navigation started in Cavite on 24 June, they caught sight of the American land on 5 December in latitude North of 29 degrees and docked in Acapulco on 8 January 1679. Only 192 people were alive, several of them dying, out of more than 400 that had begun the voyage.

=== Back in the Spanish court ===
In New Spain he again did not feel himself useful, and decided to return to Spain, this time crossing the Atlantic Ocean. He finally reached Madrid in January 1680, just in time to attend the celebrations of the arrival of Maria Luisa of Orléans, recently married to King Charles II of Spain.

He wrote the account of his adventures around the world in a very objective, detailed and interesting book, Peregrinación del mundo (World's peregrination), first published in Madrid in 1680. An extended second edition was brought out in 1682 in Naples, by then a Spanish possession.

== Across Europe again ==
Later on Cubero went again to Rome, and was appointed by the Holy See Apostolic confessor of the Army of Leopold I, Holy Roman Emperor and King of Hungary, in the Great Turkish War. There he witnessed the 1686 siege of Buda. He then traveled to other European countries, including England where he met King James II, and in 1697 published a second book, Segunda Peregrinación ..., that gathered together his European experiences.

== See also ==
- Martín Ignacio de Loyola
- Pedro Ordóñez de Ceballos
