= Pedro Ordóñez de Ceballos =

Spanish traveller and writer (1556–1636)

Pedro Ordóñez de Ceballos (Jaén, Spain, 1556 – 1636) was a Spanish adventurer, soldier and eventually priest and writer, best known for his travel around the world between 1589 and 1593. He started and ended his travel in Quito, Viceroyalty of Perú, and crossed successively the Pacific, Indian and Atlantic oceans and South America mainland from Buenos Aires to Quito.

Main event in the travel was his stay in Cochinchina that lasted for several months in late 1591 and put him in close relation with Emperor Lê Thế Tông and his sister, whom he converted to catholicism. He was then, in February 1592, hold prisoner by the Portuguese adventurer Diogo Veloso and had to pay him a ransom for his release.

He had been ordered priest in Bogotá around 1588, and published the story of his travels in 1614 under the title of Viaje del Mundo (World Travel).

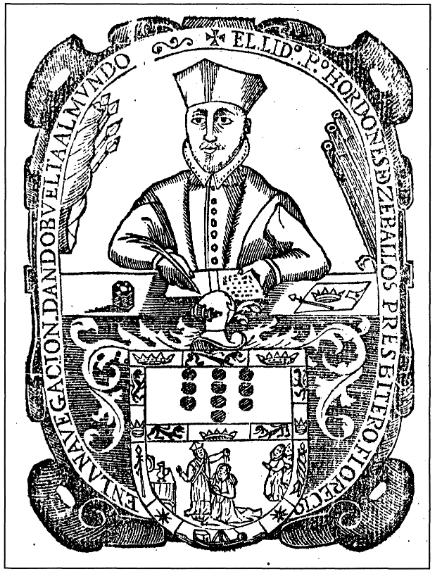
Pedro Ordóñez de Ceballos, was a Spanish adventurer and soldier.

== See also ==
- Martín Ignacio de Loyola
- Pedro Cubero
