= María de Lajara =

María de Lajara or Laxara, or also María de La Jara, was a 17th-century Spanish woman, known for her fate aboard the Manila Galleon and for her name having been attributed to a Pacific Ocean island.

== The story ==
The story of María de Lajara's fate was published in 1699 by Gemelli Careri, in his work Giro del Mondo (Around the World). Careri wrote (in James Burney's translation): "Donna Maria de Lajara, a young Spanish woman, who in returning from Manila [to New Spain], not having patience to endure longer the inconveniences of the passages, threw herself into the sea".

Maria de Lajara was very probably a descendant or relative of Juan de La Jara, Maestre de Campo (a high ranking army officer), who in 1596, after the death of Esteban Rodriguez de Figueroa, led the initially failed Spanish conquest of the island of Mindanao. If so, she was in all likelihood born in Philippines.

== The island ==
Since the late 17th century up to the early 19th century, Pacific Ocean charts registered an island named Dona Maria de Lajara, or de Laxara, or even Maria Laxar around 27 degrees North latitude and 140 West from Greenwich longitude (that is East-northeast from Hawaii). As Gemelli wrote, such an island was supposedly near the place were María de Lajara hurled herself into the sea.

However no island actually exists in that area and therefore it is presently catalogued as a phantom island. Another possibility, given the imprecise nature of geographical position in early modern times, is that Dona Maria de Lajara island could originally be one of the Bonin Islands, around 27 degrees North and 140 East from Greenwich. There is small volcanic island at this location. Those identifying the phantom island have perhaps mistakenly moved to the longitude to 140 West.

== Work Cited ==
- Gemelli Careri, Voyage Round the World (London, 1704)
- James Burney, Chronological History of the Voyages and Discoveries in the South Sea or Pacific Ocean (London, 1803–1817).
- Stommel, Henry (1984). Lost Islands: The Story of Islands That Have Vanished from Nautical Charts. Vancouver: University of British Columbia Press. ISBN 0-7748-0210-3., p 67
- Schurz, William Lytle. The Manila Galleon. New York: E. P. Dutton & Co., Inc., 1939.
- Universidade de Coimbra, Ephemerides astronómicas calculadas para o meridiano do Observatorio da Universidade de Coimbra (Coimbra, 1804), p 182
