= Thomas Vásquez de Liaño =

Most Reverend Thomas Vásquez de Liaño
- Bishop Elect of Paraguay
- Church: Catholic Church
- Diocese: Diocese of Paraguay
- In office: 1596–1599
- Predecessor: Alfonso Guerra (bishop)
- Successor: Martín Ignacio de Loyola

Personal details
- Born: 1546
- Died: 28 December 1599 (aged 53) Asunción, Paraguay

Thomas Vásquez de Liaño (1546 – 28 December 1599) was a Roman Catholic prelate who served as Bishop of Paraguay (1596–1599).

== Biography ==
On 18 December 1596, Thomas Vásquez de Liaño was appointed during the papacy of Pope Clement VIII as Bishop of Paraguay. He died before he was consecrated bishop on 28 December 1599.

== External links and additional sources ==
- Cheney, David M. "Archdiocese of Asunción". Catholic-Hierarchy.org. (for Chronology of Bishops) ^{[self-published]}
- Chow, Gabriel. "Metropolitan Archdiocese of Asunción (Paraguay)". GCatholic.org. (for Chronology of Bishops) ^{[self-published]}

Religious titles
Preceded by Alfonso Guerra (bishop)	Bishop of Paraguay; 1596–1599	Succeeded by Martín Ignacio de Loyola
