= Manila galleon =

Royal Spanish trading ships, 1565–1815

Galeón de Manila
- Part of Age of Discovery
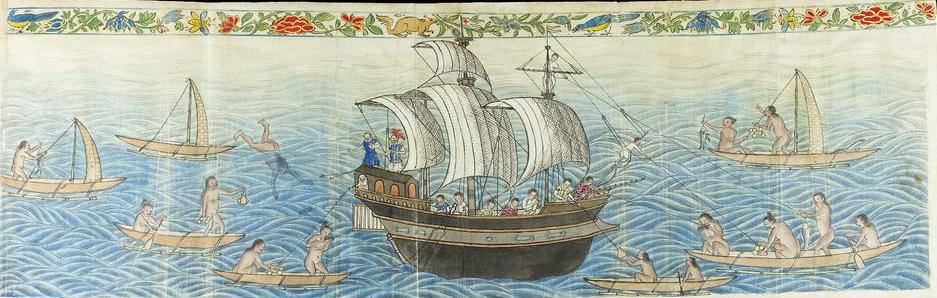
- Manila galleon (c. 1590 Boxer Codex)
- Native name: Spanish: Galeón de Manila, Tagalog: Galeon ng Maynila
- English name: Manila galleon
- Duration: From 1565 to 1815 (250 years)
- Venue: Between Manila and Acapulco
- Location: New Spain (Spanish Empire) (current Mexico)
- Also known as: Nao de China or Galeón de Acapulco
- Motive: Maritime trading route between East Indies and America
- Organised by: Spanish Crown

The Manila galleon trade route was a Spanish trade route linking the Philippines in the Spanish East Indies to Mexico (New Spain), across the Pacific Ocean, in use from 1565 to 1815. This route was plied by sailing ships or galleons i.e. the Manila galleons (Spanish: Galeón de Manila; Tagalog: Galeon ng Maynila) that made one or two round-trip voyages per year between Manila and Acapulco.

The route was inaugurated in 1565 after the Augustinian friar and navigator Andrés de Urdaneta pioneered the tornaviaje or return route from the Philippines to Mexico. Urdaneta and Alonso de Arellano made the first successful round trips that year, by taking advantage of the Kuroshio Current. The galleons set sail from Cavite, in Manila Bay, at the end of June or the first week of July, sailing through the northern Pacific and reaching Acapulco in March to April of the next calendar year. The return route from Acapulco passes through lower latitudes closer to the equator, stopping over in the Marianas, then sailing onwards through the San Bernardino Strait off Cape Espiritu Santo in Samar and then to Manila Bay and anchoring again off Cavite by June or July. The trade using "Urdaneta's route" lasted until 1815, when the Mexican War of Independence broke out. The majority of these galleons were built and loaded in shipyards in Cavite, utilizing native hardwoods like the Philippine teak, with sails produced in Ilocos, and with the rigging and cordage made from salt-resistant Manila hemp. The vast majority of the galleon's crew consisted of Filipino natives; many of whom were farmers, street children, or vagrants press-ganged into service as sailors. The officers and other skilled crew were usually Spaniards (a high percentage of whom were of Basque descent). The galleons were state vessels and thus the cost of their construction and upkeep was borne by the Spanish Crown.

The galleons mostly carried cargoes of Chinese and other Asian luxury goods in exchange for New World silver. Silver prices in Asia were substantially higher than in America, leading to an arbitrage opportunity for the Manila galleon. Every space of the galleons was packed tightly with cargo, even spaces outside the holds like the decks, cabins, and magazines. In extreme cases, they towed barges filled with more goods. While this resulted in slow passage (which sometimes resulted in shipwrecks or turning back), the profit margins were so high that it was commonly practiced. These goods included Indian ivory and precious stones, Chinese silk and porcelain, cloves from the Moluccas islands, cinnamon, ginger, lacquers, tapestries and perfumes from all over Asia. In addition, slaves (collectively known as "chinos") from various parts of Asia (mainly slaves bought from the Portuguese slave markets and Muslim captives from the Spanish–Moro conflict) were also transported from the Manila slave markets to Mexico. Free indigenous Filipinos also migrated to Mexico via the galleons (including galleon crew that jumped ship), comprising the majority of free Asian settlers ("chinos libres") in Mexico, particularly in regions near the terminal ports of the Manila galleons. The route also fostered cultural exchanges that shaped the identities and the culture of the countries involved.

The Manila galleons were also known colloquially in New Spain as La Nao de China ("The China Ship") because they carried mostly Chinese goods shipped from Manila. The Manila Galleon route was an early instance of globalization, representing a trade route from Asia that crossed to the Americas, thereby connecting all the world's continents in global silver trade.

In 2015, the Philippines and Mexico began preparations for the nomination of the Manila–Acapulco Galleon Trade Route in the UNESCO World Heritage List with backing from Spain, which has also suggested the tri-national nomination of the archives on the Manila–Acapulco Galleons in the UNESCO Memory of the World Register.

== History ==
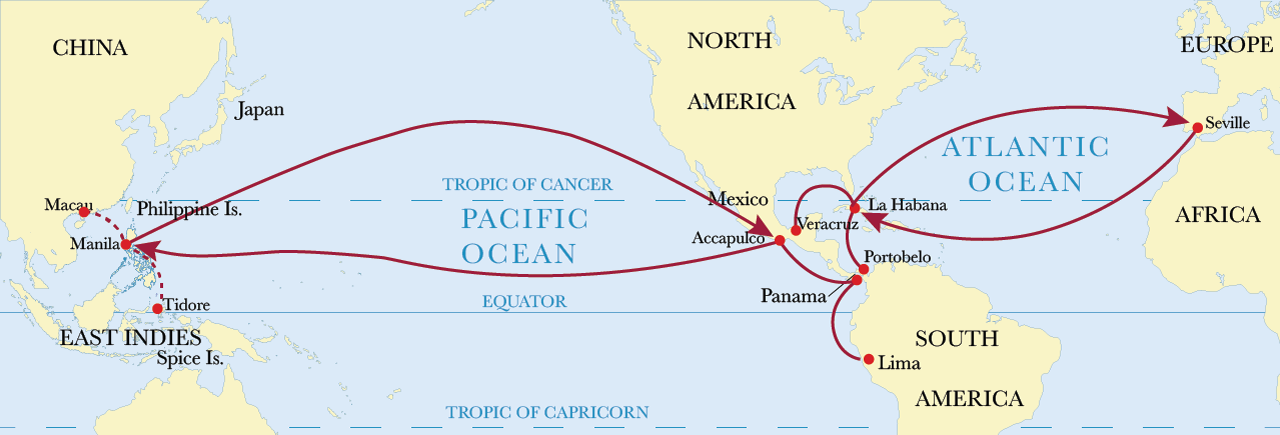
Manila-Acapulco galleon trade route, showing onward route to Spain

=== Discovery of the route ===
Iberian mare clausum claims during the Age of Discovery

Spain's presence in the Philippines came from a desire to compete with Portugal for control of the spice trade. Between 1500 and 1530, the Portuguese crown worked to replace Middle Eastern and Venetian traders as the principal transporter of lucrative spices, conquering Goa in 1510 and making contact with the Maluku Islands in modern Indonesia in 1515. In 1521, a Spanish expedition led by Ferdinand Magellan sailed west across the Pacific using the westward trade winds. The expedition discovered the Mariana Islands and the Philippines and claimed them for Spain. Although Magellan was killed by natives commanded by Lapulapu during the battle of Mactan in the Philippines, one of his ships, the Victoria, made it back to Spain by continuing westward.

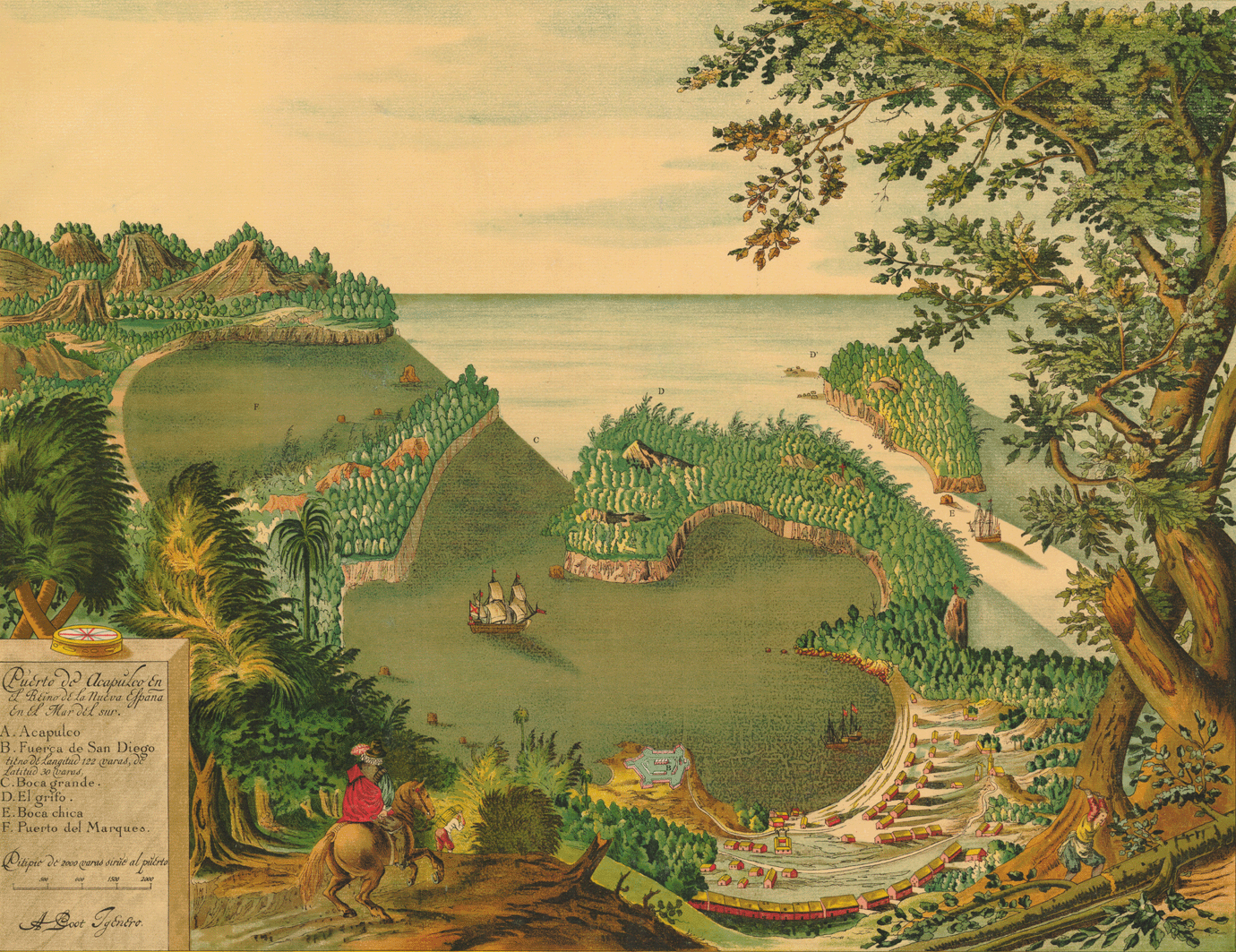
Acapulco in 1628, Mexican terminus of the Manila galleon

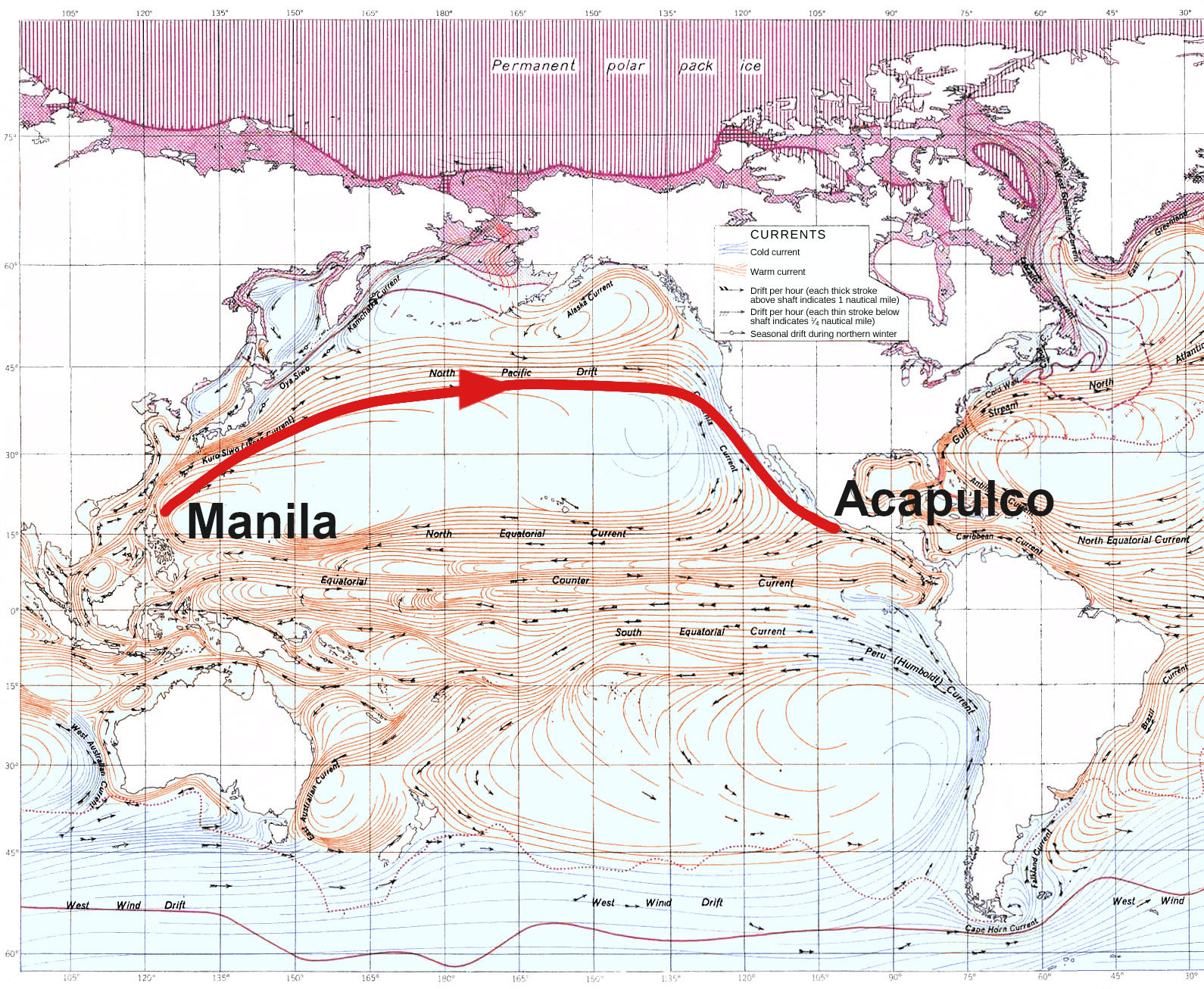
Northerly trade route as used by eastbound Manila galleons

To settle and trade with these islands from the Americas, an eastward maritime return path was necessary. The Trinidad, which tried this a few years later, failed. In 1529, Álvaro de Saavedra Cerón also tried sailing east from the Philippines, but could not find "westerlies" across the Pacific. In 1543, Bernardo de la Torre also failed. In 1542, however, Juan Rodríguez Cabrillo helped pave the way by sailing north from Mexico to explore the Pacific coast, reaching just north of the 38th parallel at the Russian River. The frustration of these failures is shown in a letter sent in 1552 from Portuguese Goa by the Spanish missionary Francis Xavier to Simão Rodrigues asking that no more fleets attempt the New Spain–East Asia route, lest they be lost.

Despite prior failures navigator Andrés de Urdaneta effectively persuaded Spanish officials in New Spain that a Philippines–Mexico trade route was preferable to other alternatives. He argued against direct trade between Spain and the Philippines through the Strait of Magellan on the basis that climate would make passage through the strait possible only during summer and that therefore ships would need to stay the winter in a more northern port. His preference for Mexico rather than for the shorter overland route through Darién is thought to have been due to his links to Pedro de Alvarado.

The Manila–Acapulco galleon trade finally began when Spanish navigators Alonso de Arellano and Andrés de Urdaneta discovered the eastward return route in 1565. Sailing as part of the expedition commanded by Miguel López de Legazpi to conquer the Philippines in 1564, Urdaneta was given the task of finding a return route. Reasoning that the trade winds of the Pacific might move in a gyre as the Atlantic winds did, they sailed north, going all the way to the 38th parallel north, off the east coast of Japan, before catching the westerlies that would take them back across the Pacific. He commanded a vessel which completed the eastward voyage in 129 days; this marked the opening of the Manila galleon trade.

Reaching the west coast of North America, Urdaneta's ship, the San Pedro, hit the coast near Santa Catalina Island, California, then followed the shoreline south to San Blas and later to Acapulco, arriving on October 8, 1565. Most of his crew died on the long initial voyage, for which they had not sufficiently provisioned. Arellano, who had taken a more southerly route, had already arrived.

The English privateer Francis Drake also reached the California coast, in 1579. After capturing a Spanish ship heading for Manila, Drake turned north, hoping to meet another Spanish treasure ship coming south on its return from Manila to Acapulco. He failed in that regard, but staked an English claim somewhere on the northern California coast. Although the ship's log and other records were lost, the officially accepted location is now called Drakes Bay, on Point Reyes south of Cape Mendocino. (Note: The Drakes Cove site began its review by the National Park Service (NPS) in 1994, thus starting an 18-year study of the suggested Drake sites. The first formal nomination to mark the Nova Albion site at Drake's Cove as a National Historic Landmark was provided to NPS on January 1, 1996. As part of its review, NPS obtained independent, confidential comments from professional historians. The NPS staff concluded that the Drake's Cove site is the "most probable" and "most likely" Drake landing site. The National Park System Advisory Board Landmarks Committee sought public comments on the Port of Nova Albion Historic and Archaeological District Nomination and received more than two dozen letters of support and none in opposition. At the Committee's meeting of November 9, 2011, in Washington, DC, representatives of the government of Spain, the National Oceanic and Atmospheric Administration and Congresswoman Lynn Wolsey all spoke in favor of the nomination: there was no opposition. Staff and the Drake Navigators Guild's president, Edward Von der Porten, gave the presentation. The Nomination was strongly endorsed by committee member Dr. James M. Allan, Archaeologist, and the Committee as a whole which approved the nomination unanimously. The National Park System Advisory Board sought further public comments on the Nomination, but no additional comments were received. At the Board's meeting on December 1, 2011, in Florida, the nomination was further reviewed: the Board approved the nomination unanimously. On October 16, 2012, Secretary of the Interior Ken Salazar signed the nomination and on October 17, 2012, The Drakes Bay Historic and Archaeological District was formally announced as a new National Historic Landmark.)

By the 18th century, it was understood that a less northerly track was sufficient when nearing the North American coast, and galleon navigators steered well clear of the rocky and often fogbound northern and central California coast. According to historian William Lytle Schurz, "They generally made their landfall well down the coast, somewhere between Point Conception and Cape San Lucas ... After all, these were preeminently merchant ships, and the business of exploration lay outside their field, though chance discoveries were welcomed".

The first motivation for land exploration of present-day California was to scout out possible way stations for the seaworn Manila galleons on the last leg of their journey. Early proposals came to little, but in 1769, the Portola expedition established ports at San Diego and Monterey (which became the administrative center of Alta California), providing safe harbors for returning Manila galleons.

=== The Manila galleon and California ===
Despite annual galleons sailing along the coast from 1565-1769, no ships discovered the Golden Gate and San Francisco Bay, due to factors such as fog, ships avoiding sailing close to shore, and hills making the coast look continuous from a distance.

In 1587 Spaniards discovered Morro Bay, far south of San Francisco. In 1594 they discovered Drake's Bay north of San Francisco and Monterey Bay south of it. Galleons stopped in Monterey prior to California's Spanish settlement in 1769; however, visits became regular between 1777 and 1794 because the Crown ordered the galleon to stop in Monterey. Monterey was about two months and three weeks out from Manila in the 18th century, and the galleon tended to stop there 40 days before arriving in Acapulco.

=== Trade ===
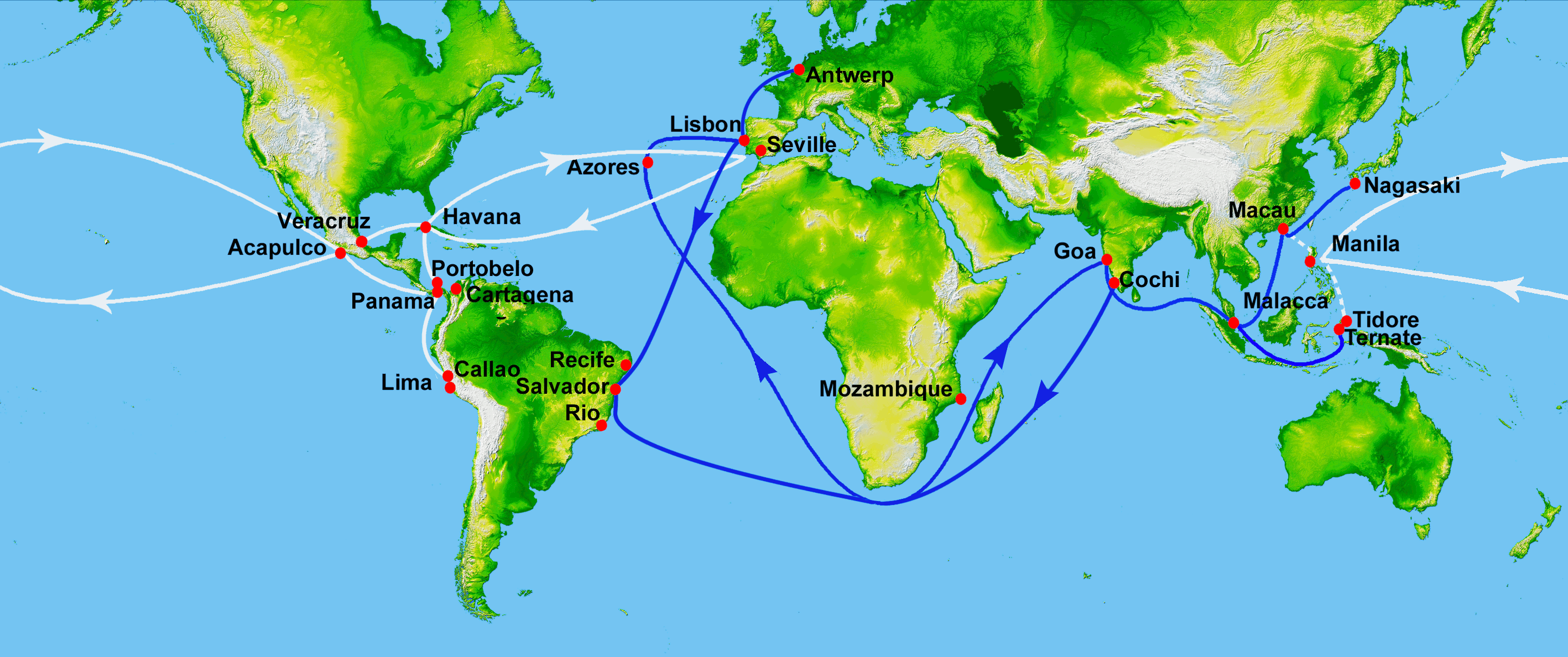
White represents the route of the Manila galleons in the Pacific and the flota in the Atlantic. (Blue represents Portuguese routes).

Trade with Ming China via Manila served as a major source of revenue for the Spanish Empire and as a fundamental source of income for Spanish colonists in the Philippine Islands. Galleons used for the trade between East and West were crafted by Filipino artisans. Until 1593, two or more ships would set sail annually from each port. The Manila trade became so lucrative that Seville merchants petitioned king Philip II of Spain to protect the monopoly of the Casa de Contratación based in Seville. This led to the passing of a decree in 1593 that set a limit of two ships sailing each year from either port, with one kept in reserve in Acapulco and one in Manila. An "armada", or armed escort of galleons, was also approved. Due to official attempts to control the galleon trade, contraband and understating of ships' cargoes became widespread.

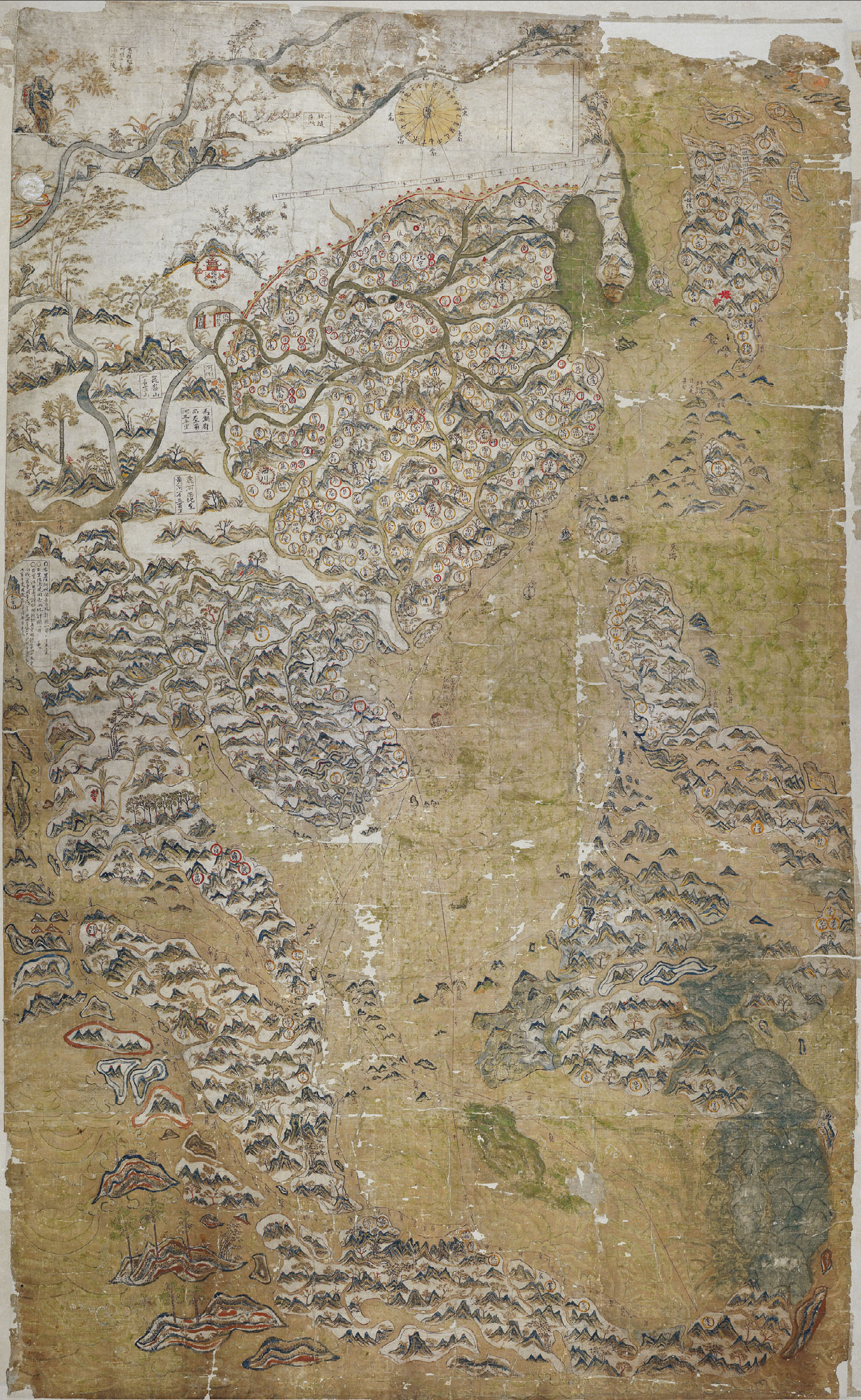
The Selden Map, a merchant map showing trade routes with its epicenter from Quanzhou to Manila and the Spanish Philippines, then across the Far East

The galleon trade was supplied by merchants largely from port areas of Fujian, such as Quanzhou, as depicted in the Selden Map, and Yuegang (the old port of Haicheng in Zhangzhou, Fujian), who traveled to Manila to sell the Spaniards spices, porcelain, ivory, lacquerware, processed silk cloth and other valuable commodities. Cargoes varied from one voyage to another but often included goods from all over Asia: jade, wax, gunpowder and silk from China; amber, cotton and rugs from India; spices from Indonesia and Malaysia; and a variety of goods from Japan, the Spanish part of the so-called Nanban trade, including Japanese fans, chests, screens, porcelain and lacquerware.

In addition, slaves of various origins, including East Africa, Portuguese India, the Muslim sultanates of Southeast Asia, and the Spanish Philippines, were transported from Manila and sold in New Spain. African slaves were categorized as negros or cafres while all slaves of Asian origin were called chinos. The lack of detailed records makes it difficult to estimate the total number of slaves transported or the proportions of slaves from each region.

Galleons transported goods to be sold in the Americas, namely in New Spain and Peru, as well as in European markets. East Asia trading primarily functioned on a silver standard due to Ming China's use of silver ingots as a medium of exchange. As such, goods were mostly bought with silver mined from New Spain and Potosí.

The cargoes arrived in Acapulco and were transported by land across Mexico. Mule trains would carry the goods along the China Road from Acapulco first to the administrative center of Mexico City, then on to the port of Veracruz on the Gulf of Mexico, where they were loaded onto the Spanish treasure fleet bound for Spain. The transport of goods overland by porters, the housing of travelers and sailors at inns by innkeepers, and the stocking of long voyages with food and supplies provided by haciendas before departing Acapulco helped to stimulate the economy of New Spain.

The trade of goods and exchanges of people were not limited to Mexico and the Philippines, since Guatemala, Panama, Ecuador, and Peru also served as supplementary streams to the main one between Mexico and Philippines.

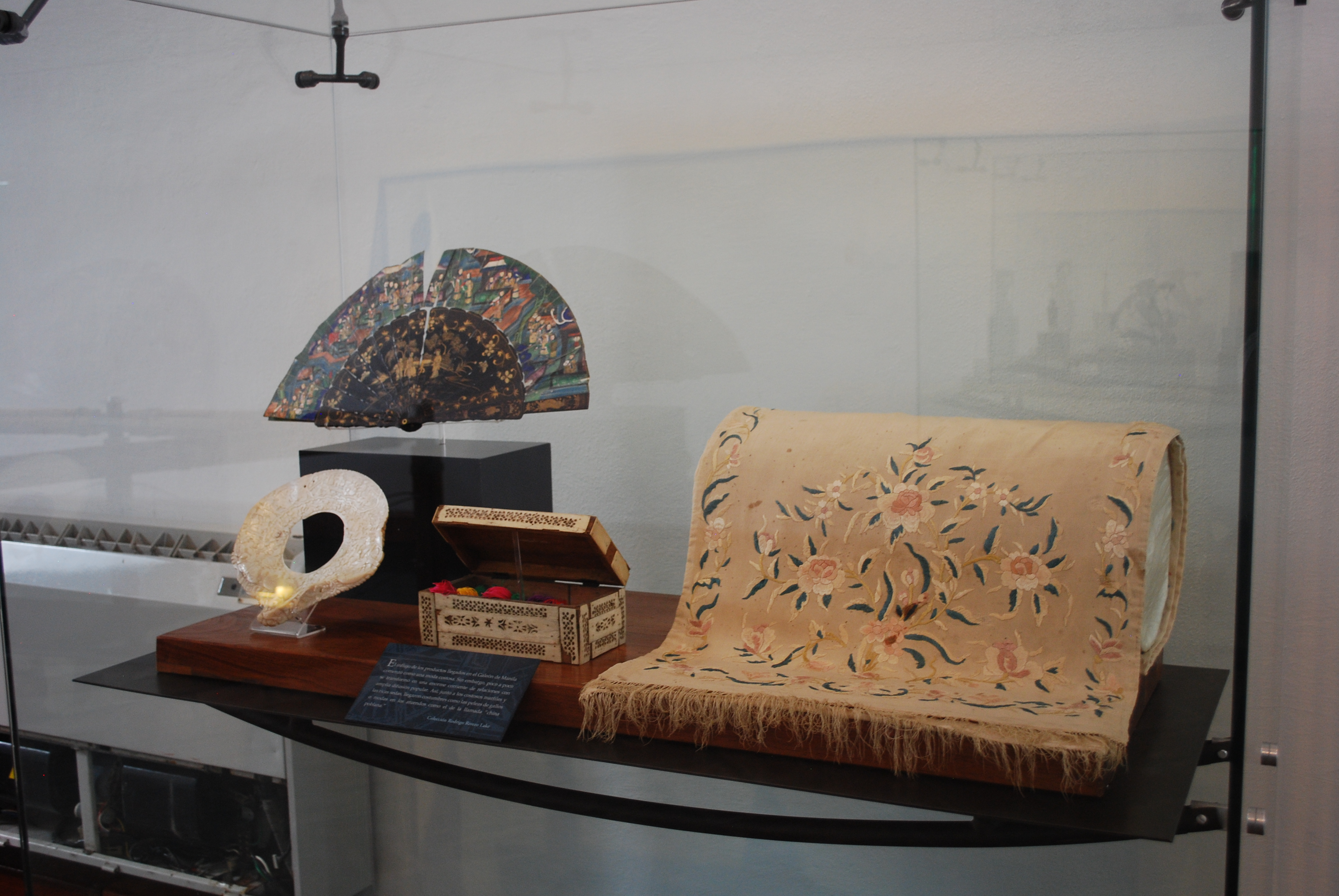
Sample of goods brought via Manila galleon in Acapulco

Around 80% of the goods shipped back from Acapulco to Manila were crops from the Americas – silver, cochineal, seeds, sweet potato, maize, tomato, tobacco, chickpeas, chocolate and cocoa, watermelon seeds, vines, and fig trees. The remaining 20% were goods transshipped from Europe and North Africa such as wine and olive oil, and metal goods such as weapons, knobs and spurs.

This Pacific route was the alternative to the trip west across the Indian Ocean, and around the Cape of Good Hope, which was reserved to Portugal according to the Treaty of Tordesillas. It also avoided stopping over at ports controlled by competing powers such as Portugal and the Netherlands.

From the early days of exploration, the Spanish knew that the American continent was much narrower across the Panamanian isthmus than across Mexico. They tried to establish a regular land crossing there, but the thick jungle and tropical diseases such as yellow fever and malaria made it impractical.

It took at least four months to sail across the Pacific Ocean from Manila to Acapulco, and the galleons were the main link between the Philippines and the viceregal capital at Mexico City and thence to Spain itself. Many of the so-called "Kastilas" or Spaniards in the Philippines were actually of Mexican descent, and the Hispanic culture of the Philippines is influenced by Spanish and Mexican culture in particular. Soldiers and settlers recruited from Mexico and Peru also gathered in Acapulco before they were sent to settle at the presidios of the Philippines. Even after the galleon era, and at the time when Mexico finally gained its independence, the two nations still continued to trade, except for a brief lull during the Spanish–American War.

In Manila, the safety of ocean crossings was commended to the virgin Nuestra Señora de la Soledad de Porta Vaga in masses held by the Archbishop of Manila. If the expedition was successful the voyagers would go to La Ermita (the church) to pay homage and offer gold, gems or jewelry from Hispanic countries to the image of the virgin. So it came to be that the virgin was named the "Queen of the Galleons".

Economic shocks due to the arrival of Spanish-American silver in China were among the factors that led to the end of the Ming dynasty.

=== End of the galleons ===
In 1740, as part of the administrative changes of the Bourbon Reforms, the Spanish crown began allowing the use of registered ships or navíos de registro in the Pacific. These ships traveled solo, outside the convoy system of the galleons. While these solo voyages would not immediately replace the galleon system, they were more efficient and better able to avoid being captured by the Royal Navy of Great Britain.

In 1813, the Cortes of Cádiz decreed the suppression of the route and the following year, with the end of the Peninsular War, Ferdinand VII of Spain ratified the dissolution. The last ship to reach Manila was the San Fernando or Magallanes, which arrived empty, as its cargo had been requisitioned in Mexico.

The Manila–Acapulco galleon trade ended in 1815, a few years before Mexico gained independence from Spain in 1821. After this, the Spanish Crown took direct control of the Philippines and governed directly from Madrid. Sea transport became easier in the mid-19th century after the invention of steam powered ships and the opening of the Suez Canal, which reduced the travel time from Spain to the Philippines to 40 days.

== Galleons ==
=== Construction ===
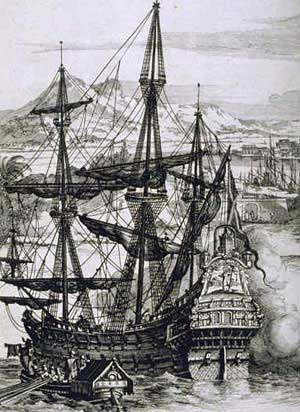
Spanish galleon

Between 1609 and 1616, nine galleons and six galleys were constructed in Philippine shipyards. The average cost was 78,000 pesos per galleon and at least 2,000 trees. The galleons constructed included the San Juan Bautista, San Marcos, Nuestra Señora de Guadalupe, Angel de la Guardia, San Felipe, Santiago, Salbador, Espiritu Santo, and San Miguel. "From 1729 to 1739, the main purpose of the Cavite shipyard was the construction and outfitting of the galleons for the Manila to Acapulco trade run."

Due to the route's high profitability but long voyage time, it was essential to build the largest possible galleons, which were the largest class of European ships known to have been built until then. In the 16th century, they averaged from 1,700 to 2,000 tons, were built of Philippine hardwoods and could carry 300–500 passengers. The Concepción, wrecked in 1638, was 43 to 49 m (141 ft 1 in to 160 ft 9 in) long and displaced some 2,000 tons. The Santísima Trinidad was 51.5 m (169 ft 0 in) long. Most of the ships were built in the Philippines; only eight were built in Mexico.

=== Crews ===
Sailors averaged age 28 or 29 while the oldest were between 40 and 50. Ships' pages were children who entered service mostly at age 8, many orphans or poor taken from the streets of Seville, Mexico and Manila. Apprentices were older than the pages and if successful would be certified as sailor at age 20. Mortality rates were high, with ships arriving in Manila with a majority of their crew often dead from starvation, disease and scurvy, especially in the early years, so Spanish officials in Manila found it difficult to find men to crew their ships to return to Acapulco. Many native Filipinos and others of Southeast Asian origin (also called Indios) made up the majority of the crew. Other crew were made up of deportees and criminals from Spain and other Spanish colonies. Many criminals were sentenced to serve as crew on royal ships. Less than a third of the crew was Spanish, and they usually held key positions aboard the galleon.

At port, goods were unloaded by dockworkers, and food was often supplied locally. In Acapulco, the arrival of the galleons provided seasonal work for dockworkers, who were typically free Afro-Mexican men highly paid for their backbreaking labor, and for farmers and haciendas across Mexico who helped stock the ships with food before voyages. On land, travelers were often housed at inns or mesones, and had goods transported by muleteers, which provided opportunities for Mexico's native population. By providing for the galleons, colonial Spanish America was tied into the broader global economy.

=== Shipwrecks ===
The wrecks of the Manila galleons are legends second only to the wrecks of treasure ships in the Caribbean. In 1568, Miguel López de Legazpi's own ship, the San Pablo (300 tons), was the first Manila galleon to be wrecked en route to Mexico. Between the years 1576 when the Espiritu Santo was lost and 1798 when the San Cristobal was lost, twenty Manila galleons wrecked within the Philippine archipelago. In 1596 the San Felipe was wrecked in Japan.

At least one galleon, probably the Santo Cristo de Burgos, is believed to have wrecked on the coast of Oregon in 1693. Known as the Beeswax wreck, the event is described in the oral histories of the Tillamook and Clatsop, which suggest that some of the crew survived. This shipwreck inspired the popular 1985 film The Goonies.

An oral tradition in Hawaii describes a ship (believed to be a Manila galleon) named the Konaliloha, that was wrecked off the west coast of Hawaii Island sometime during the 16th century, with the survivors joining and intermarrying with Native Hawaiians.

=== Captures ===
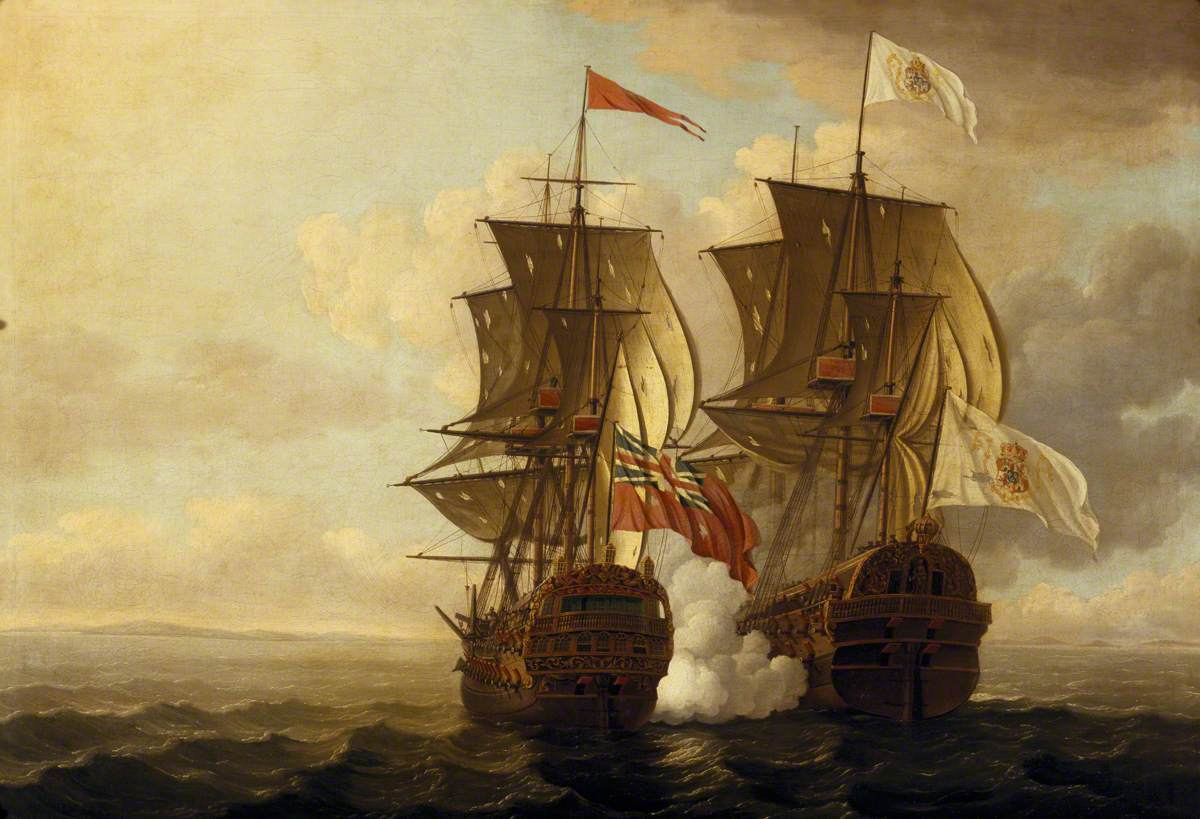
George Anson's capture of the Manila galleon on April 20, 1743

Between 1565 and 1815, 108 ships operated as Manila galleons, of which 26 were captured or sunk by the enemy during wartime, including the Santa Ana captured in 1587 by Thomas Cavendish off the coast of Baja California; the San Diego, which was sunk in 1600 in Bahía de Manila by Oliver Van Noort; Nuestra Señora de la Encarnación captured by Woodes Rogers in 1709; Nuestra Senora de la Covadonga captured in 1743 by George Anson; Nuestra Senora de la Santisima Trinidad captured in 1762 by HMS Panther and HMS Argo at the Action of 30 October 1762 in the San Bernardino Strait; San Sebastián and Santa Ana captured in 1753–54 by George Compton; and Nuestra Señora de la Santísima Trinidad, in 1762, by Samuel Cornish.

== Possible contact with Hawaii ==
Over 250 years, there were hundreds of Manila galleon crossings of the Pacific Ocean between present-day Mexico and the Philippines, with their route taking them just south of the Hawaiian Islands on the westward leg of their round trip. Despite this, there are no records of contact with the Hawaiians. British historian Henry Kamen maintains that the Spaniards did not have the ability to properly explore the Pacific Ocean and were not capable of finding the islands, which lay at a latitude 20° north of the westbound galleon route and its currents. However, Spanish exploration in the Pacific was paramount until the late 18th century. Spanish navigators discovered many islands including Guam, the Marianas, the Carolines and the Philippines in the North Pacific, as well as Tuvalu, the Marquesas, the Solomon Islands, New Guinea, and Easter Island in the South Pacific. Spanish navigators also discovered the Pitcairn and Vanuatu archipelagos during their search for Terra Australis in the 17th century.

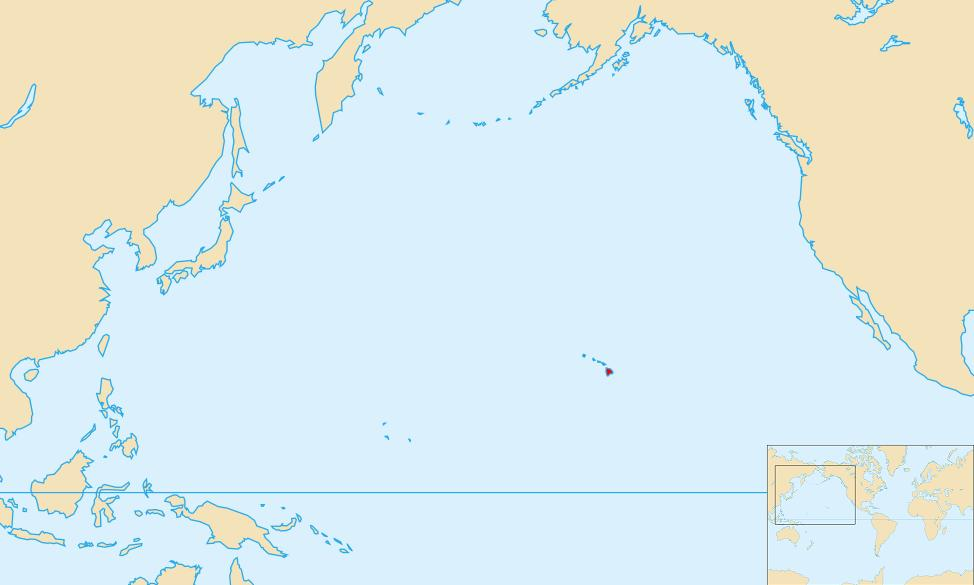
Pacific Ocean with Mauna Kea highlighted

This navigational activity leads to questions as to whether Spanish explorers arrived in the Hawaiian Islands two centuries before Captain James Cook's first visit in 1778. Ruy López de Villalobos commanded a fleet of six ships that left Acapulco in 1542 with a Spanish sailor named Ivan Gaetan or Juan Gaetano aboard as pilot. Depending on the interpretation, Gaetano's reports seem to describe the discovery of either Hawaii or the Marshall Islands in 1555.

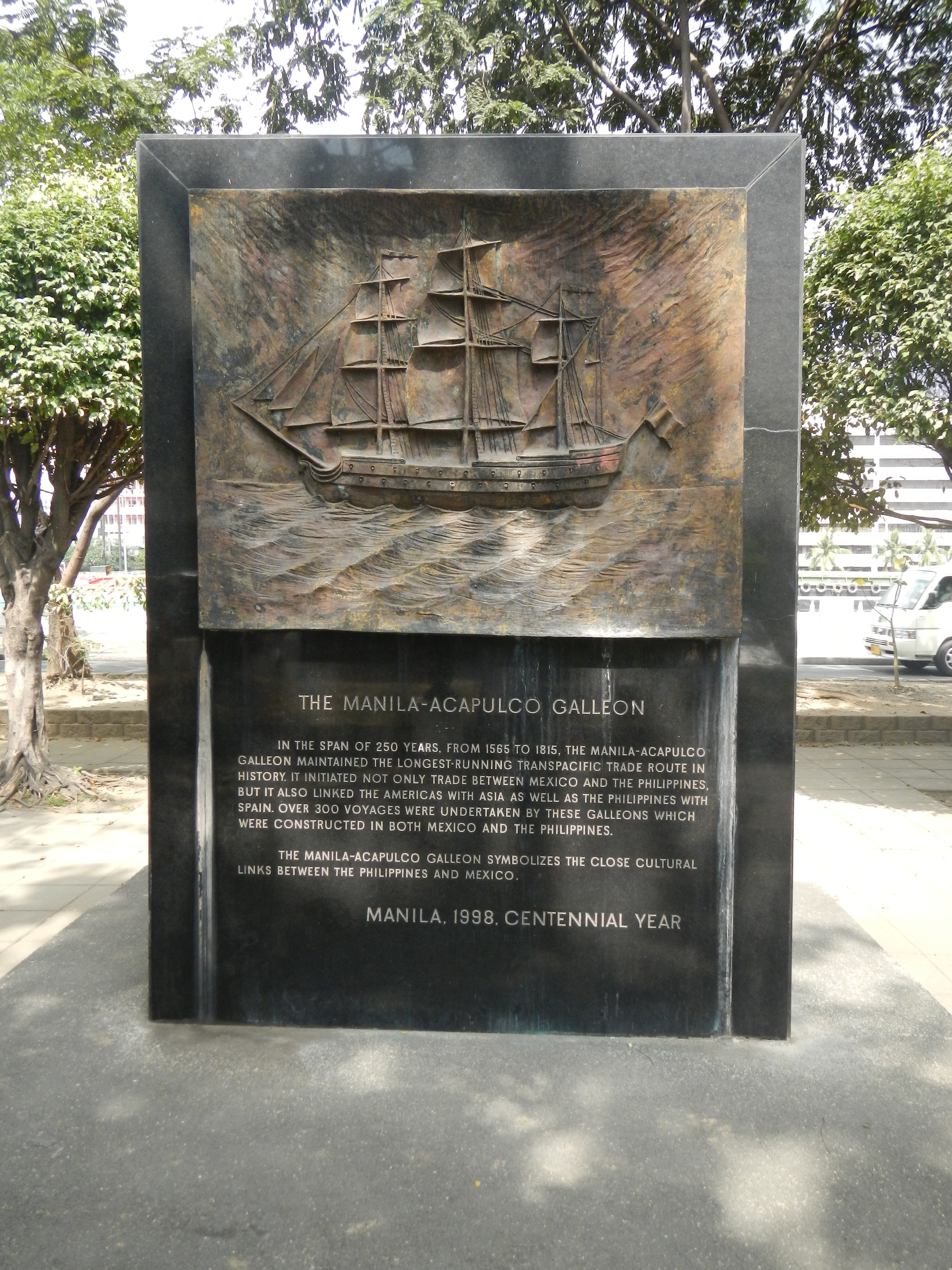
The Manila–Acapulco Galleon Memorial at Plaza Mexico in Intramuros, Manila

The westward route from Mexico passed south of Hawaii, making a short stopover in Guam before heading for Manila. The exact route was kept secret to protect the Spanish trade monopoly against competing powers, and to avoid Dutch and English pirates. Due to this policy of discretion, if the Spaniards did find Hawaii during their voyages, they would not have published their findings and the discovery would have remained unknown. From Gaetano's account, the Hawaiian islands were not known to have any valuable resources, so the Spaniards would not have made an effort to settle them. This happened in the case of the Marianas and the Carolines, which were not effectively settled until the second half of the 17th century. A Spanish chart captured by the British in 1743 depicts islands in the latitude of Hawaii but with the longitude seventeen degrees east of the Islands (reliable methods of determining longitude were not developed until the mid-18th century). The island of Maui is named La Desgraciada (the unhappy, or unfortunate), and what appears to be the island of Hawaii is named La Mesa (the table). Islands resembling Kahoolawe, Lanai, and Molokai are named Los Monjes (the monks).

The theory that the first European visitors to Hawaii were Spaniards is reinforced by the findings of William Ellis, a writer and missionary who lived in early 19th century Hawaii; he recorded several folk stories about foreigners who had visited Hawaii prior to first contact with Cook. According to Hawaiian writer Herb Kawainui Kane, one of these stories:

concerned seven foreigners who landed eight generations earlier at Kealakekua Bay in a painted boat with an awning or canopy over the stern. They were dressed in clothing of white and yellow, and one wore a sword at his side and a feather in his hat. On landing, they kneeled down in prayer. The Hawaiians, most helpful to those who were most helpless, received them kindly. The strangers ultimately married into the families of chiefs, but their names could not be included in genealogies.

Scholars have dismissed these claims as lacking credibility. Debate continues as to whether the Hawaiian Islands were actually visited by the Spanish in the 16th century with researchers like Richard W. Rogers looking for evidence of Spanish shipwrecks.

== Preparations for UNESCO nominations ==
In 2010, the Philippines foreign affairs secretary organized a diplomatic reception attended by at least 32 countries, for discussions about the historic galleon trade and the possible establishment of a galleon museum. Various Mexican and Filipino institutions and politicians also made discussions about the importance of the galleon trade in their shared history.

In 2013, the Philippines released a documentary regarding the Manila galleon trade route.

In 2014, the idea to nominate the Manila–Acapulco Galleon Trade Route as a World Heritage Site was initiated by the Mexican and Filipino ambassadors to UNESCO. Spain has also backed the nomination and suggested that the archives related to the route under the possession of the Philippines, Mexico, and Spain be nominated as part of another UNESCO list, the Memory of the World Register.

In 2015, the Unesco National Commission of the Philippines (Unacom) and the Department of Foreign Affairs organized an expert's meeting to discuss the trade route's nomination. Some of the topics presented include the Spanish colonial shipyards in Sorsogon, underwater archaeology in the Philippines, the route's influences on Filipino textile, the galleon's eastward trip from the Philippines to Mexico called tornaviaje, and the historical dimension of the galleon trade focusing on important and rare archival documents.

In 2017, the Philippines established the Manila–Acapulco Galleon Museum in Metro Manila, one of the necessary steps in nominating the trade route to UNESCO.

In 2018, Mexico reopened its Manila galleon gallery at the Archaeological Museum of Puerto Vallarta, Cuale.

In 2020, Mexico released a documentary regarding the Manila galleon trade route.

== See also ==
- Asian Mexicans – Ethnic group of Asian-descending Mexicans
- Battles of La Naval de Manila – Naval battle of the Eighty Years' War
- Bernardo de la Torre – Spanish navigator (died 1545)
- Chamorro people – Indigenous people of the Mariana Islands
- Filipino immigration to Mexico – Overview of immigration along the Galleon Route
- Global silver trade from the 16th to 19th centuries
- History of the Philippines (1521–1898) – Spanish colonial period of the Philippines
- History of the west coast of North America
- Landing of the first Filipinos – Arrival of Filipinos to the current United States in 1587
- María de Lajara
- Mexican settlement in the Philippines – Mesoamerican peoples in the Southeast Asian country
- Pedro Cubero
- Pedro de Unamuno – Spanish soldier and explorer
- Spanish East Indies – Spanish colony from 1565 to 1901
- Spanish Main – Spanish Empire holdings in the Americas
- Spanish treasure fleet – Convoy system used by the Spanish Empire from 1566 to 1790
