= Point Reyes =

Cape in Northern California

Coordinates: 37.997°N 123.020°W

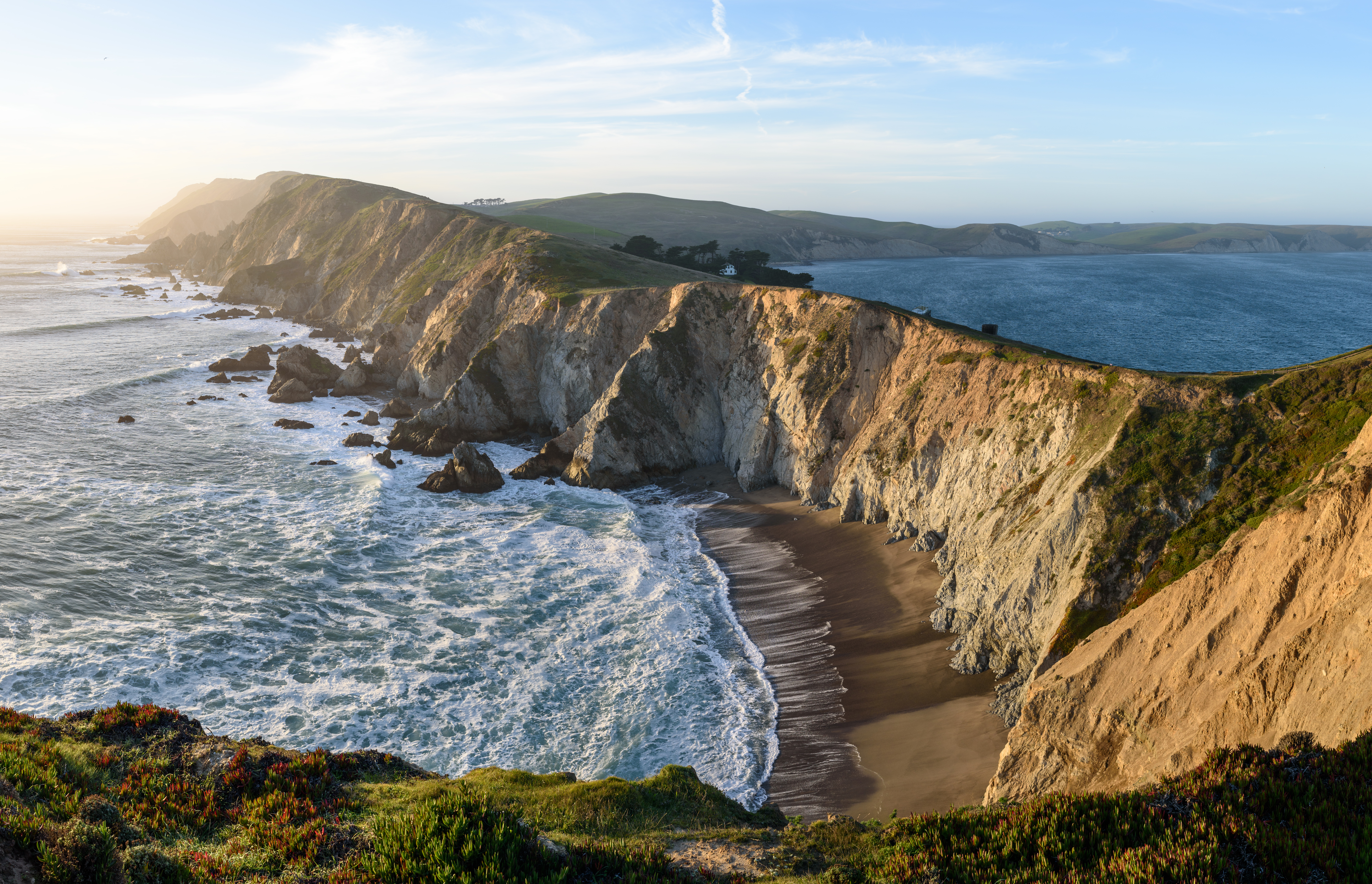
Much of the peninsula's coastline is made up of rocky cliffs, though there are also expansive sandy beaches.

Point Reyes (/ˈreɪz/ RAYZ, Spanish: [ˈreʝes]; Spanish: Punta de los Reyes, lit. 'Cape of the Kings'; Coast Miwok: Tamal Huya) is a prominent landform and popular tourist attraction on the Pacific coast of Marin County in Northern California. It is about 30 miles (50 km) west-northwest of San Francisco. The term is often applied to the Point Reyes Peninsula, the region bounded by Tomales Bay on the northeast and Bolinas Lagoon on the southeast. The majority of the peninsula as well as the headlands are protected as part of Point Reyes National Seashore.

== Overview ==
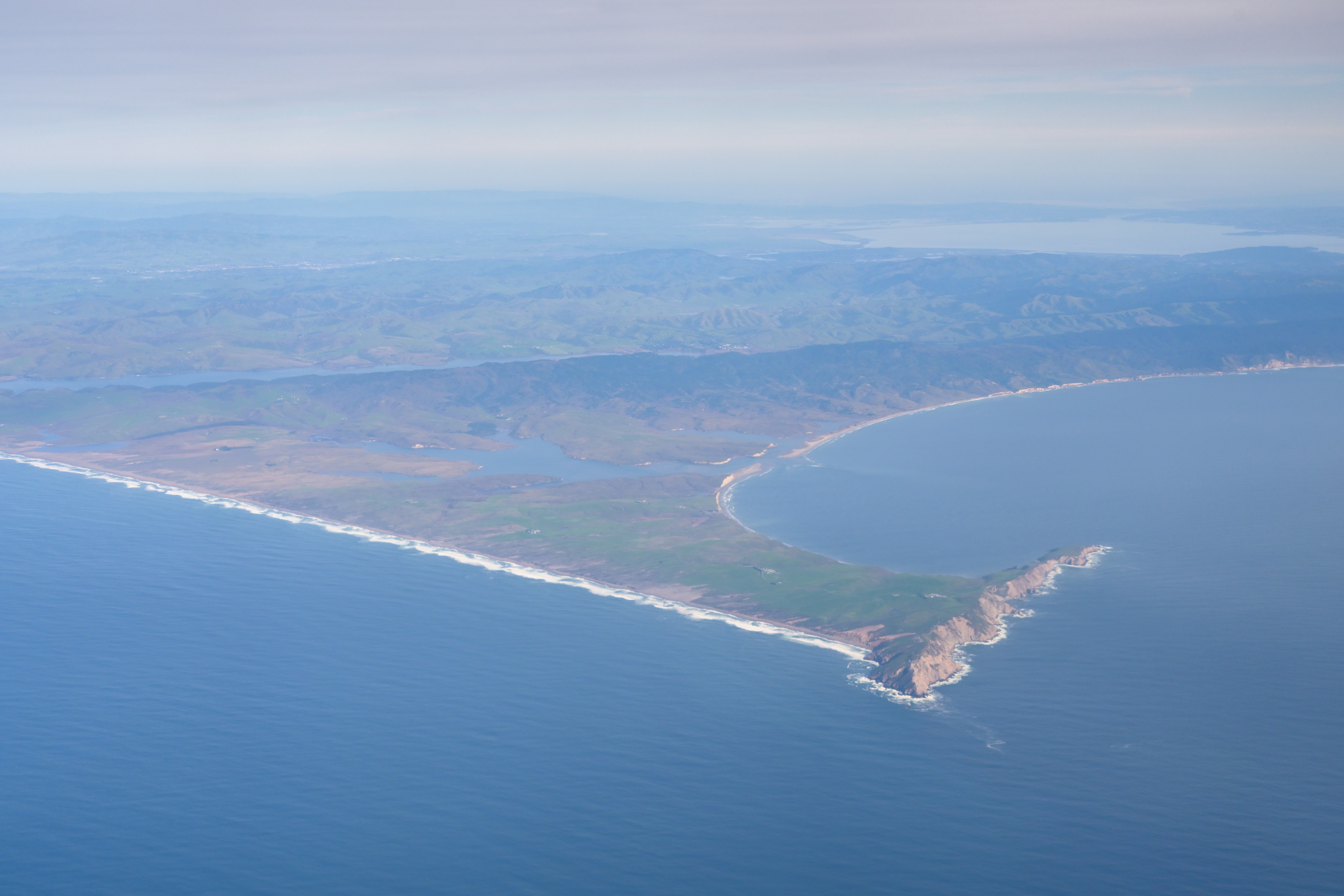
Point Reyes aerial view

The cape protects Drakes Bay on its southern side. The headland is largely drained by Drakes Estero. Drakes Bay and Drake's Estero are named after English seafarer Sir Francis Drake who possibly hauled his ship, the Golden Hinde, up onto the beach for repairs in June 1579. Inverness Ridge runs along the peninsula's northwest-southeast spine, with forested peaks around 430 metres (1,410 ft). West of the ridge, the land flattens out and the vegetation turns to scrub. The Mount Vision fire in 1995 burned part of Inverness Ridge, as well as the Woodward fire in 2020.

Point Reyes lends its name to the town of Point Reyes Station.

The point may once have been known as Lobes Lighthouse by the sailors of clipper ships on the meat trade. (Lobes are ridges of slide material commonly referred to in the literature from erosion events and the point is of that shape out to sea.)

== History ==
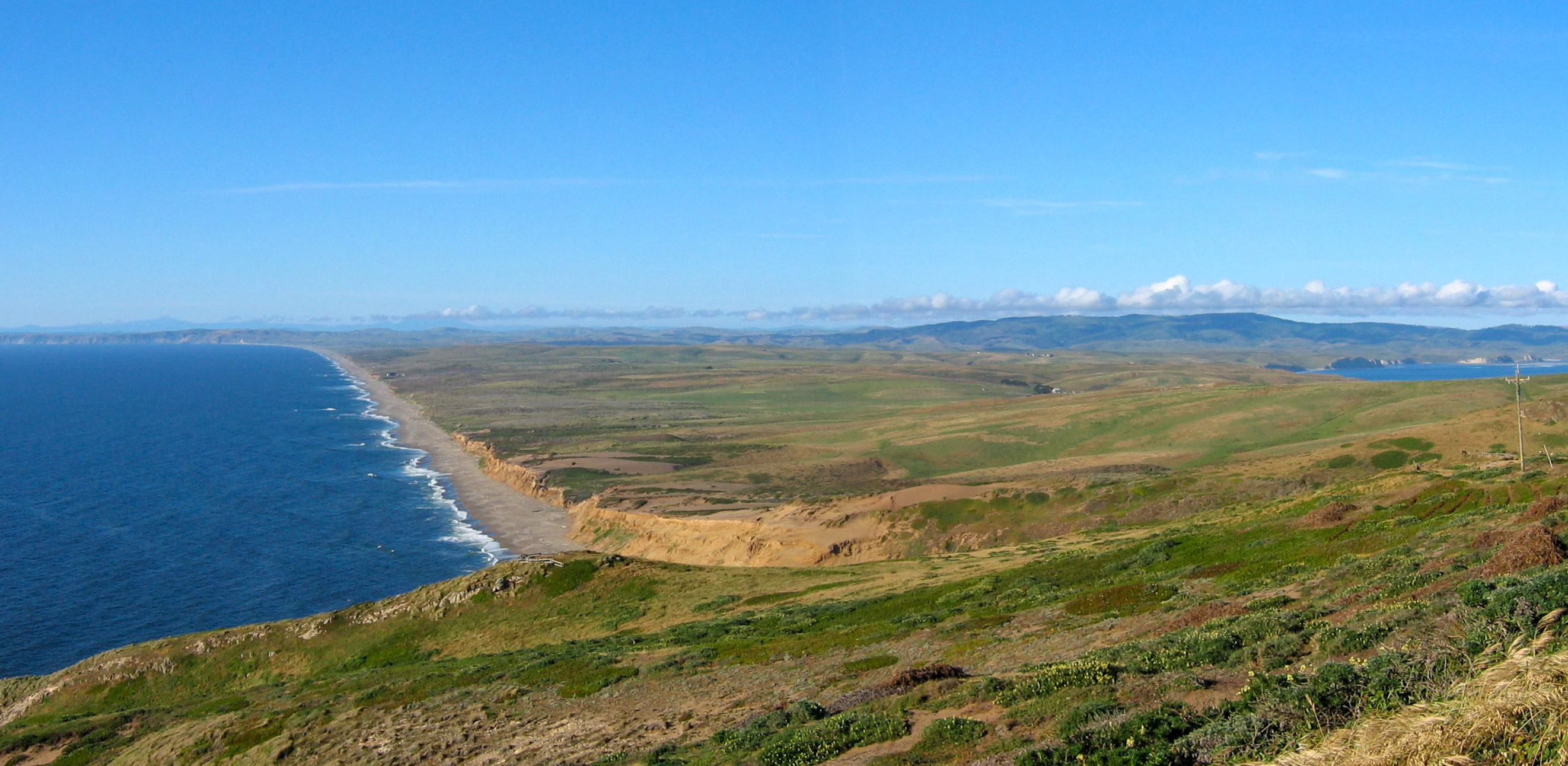
South Beach and Point Reyes Peninsula

=== The Coast Miwok ===
The contemporary inhabitants of the Point Reyes (Coast Miwok: Tamal Huya) area at the time of European arrival were the Coast Miwok. They left evidence of well over a hundred encampments on the peninsula, with a population estimated to have been nearly 3,000. Seasonal hunters and gatherers, they were nourished by fish, clams, mussels, and crab, in addition to the deer, elk, bear, mud hen, geese, and small game they hunted with spears and bows. The Coast Miwok utilized a variety of different plants growing at Point Reyes. Acorns served as a staple, as they could be stored in dry granaries to provide sustenance when food was less plentiful.

Although the Coast Miwok periodically interacted with European explorers, they continued their habitation until late in the 18th century when the Spanish built Mission San Rafael and missionaries began journeying to Point Reyes to recruit them to move to the mission. While attempting to convert them, these missionaries introduced diseases that brought many deaths, fewer births, and significantly increasing infant mortality rates.

In 1992, Coast Miwok descendants established the Federated Indians of Graton Rancheria, and in December 2000, legislation passed granting the tribe federal recognition. The tribe has almost 500 members, who engage in a revival of traditional customs and ceremonies, often held in Kule Loklo, "Valley of the Bear", a replica Miwok village in Point Reyes National Seashore.

=== Early Spanish exploration, 1542-1603 ===
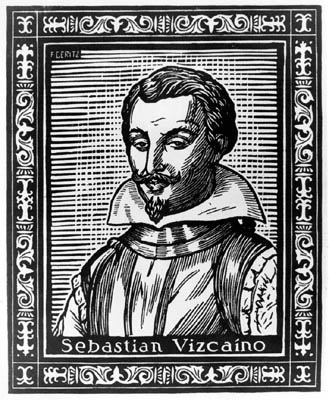
Sebastián Vizcaíno named the cape Punto de los Reyes (Spanish for "Point of the Kings"), which has transformed into the modern Spanish–English name mixture of Point Reyes.

On November 13, 1542, Spanish explorer Juan Rodríguez Cabrillo sighted and named "Cabo de Pinos" (Point Reyes), but missed the entrance to San Francisco Bay, a lapse that mariners would repeat for the next two centuries and more, due to the fog that characterizes the area. The Spanish explorer Sebastián Vizcaíno named the land Punto de los Reyes ("Kings' Point") when his ship, the Capitana, anchored in Drakes Bay on the Day of the Three Kings (Epiphany, or the end of the 12 Days of Christmas) on January 6, 1603.

=== Sir Francis Drake ===
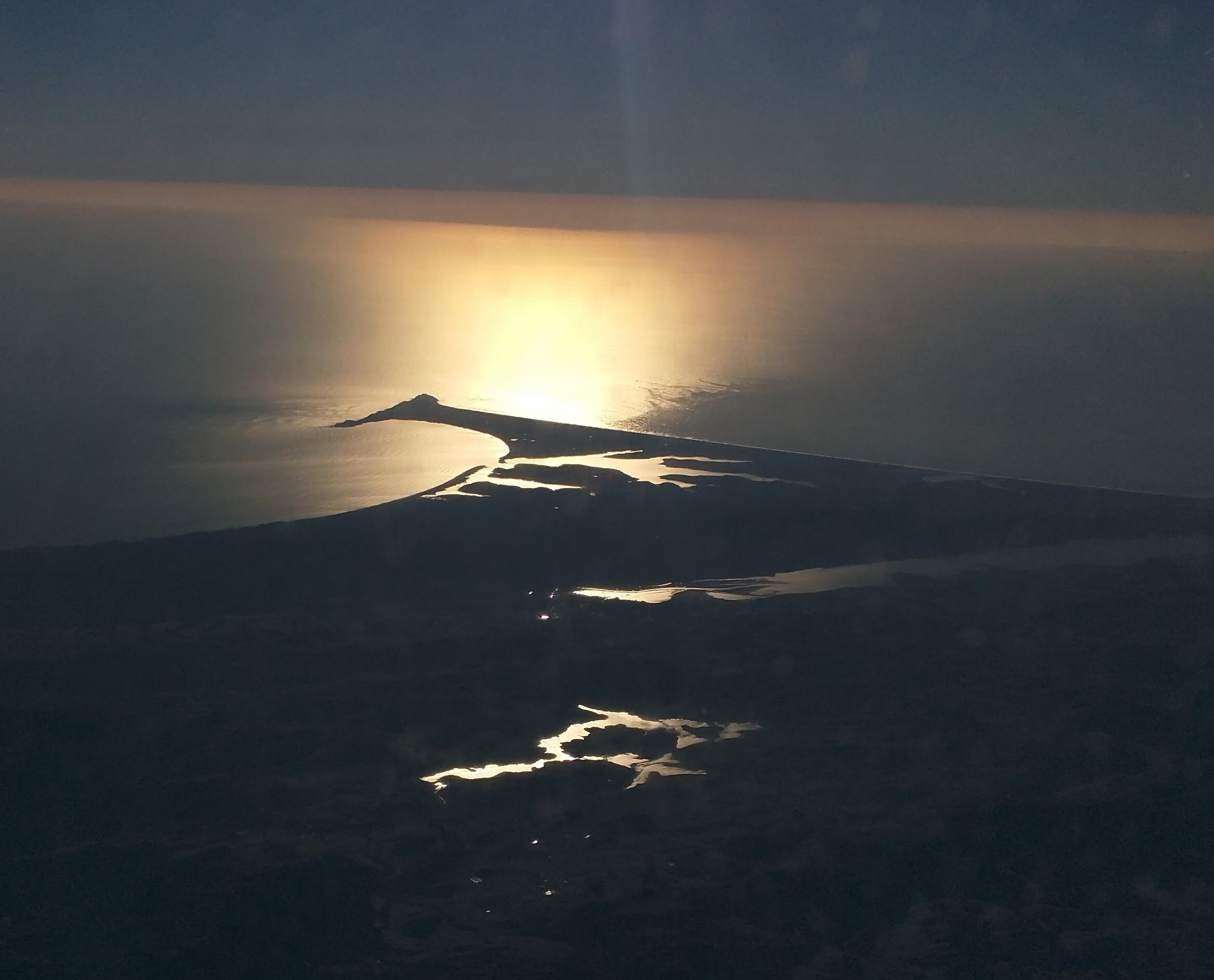
The distinctive shapes of Point Reyes, Drakes Bay, and Tomales Bay as seen from the air

Although early explorers and Spanish trading galleons journeying between the Philippines and Acapulco passed by Point Reyes, some even anchoring briefly, it is the landing by Sir Francis Drake that dominates discussion of this era of Point Reyes early history. On June 17, 1579, during his circumnavigation, he landed in the vicinity of Point Reyes and proclaimed it Nova Albion ('New Britain') . The National Historic Landmark designation has the landing as Drake's Cove at Point Reyes National Seashore. Drake's chaplain's observations about the areas inhabitants suggest the landing occurred near a Coast Miwok settlement. These notes describe the genial welcome Drake and his men received, complete with ceremony and gifts, as well as the landscape and wildlife, and included commentary about fog which frequently obscures the peninsula during the summer months.

=== The wreck of San Agustin, 1595 ===
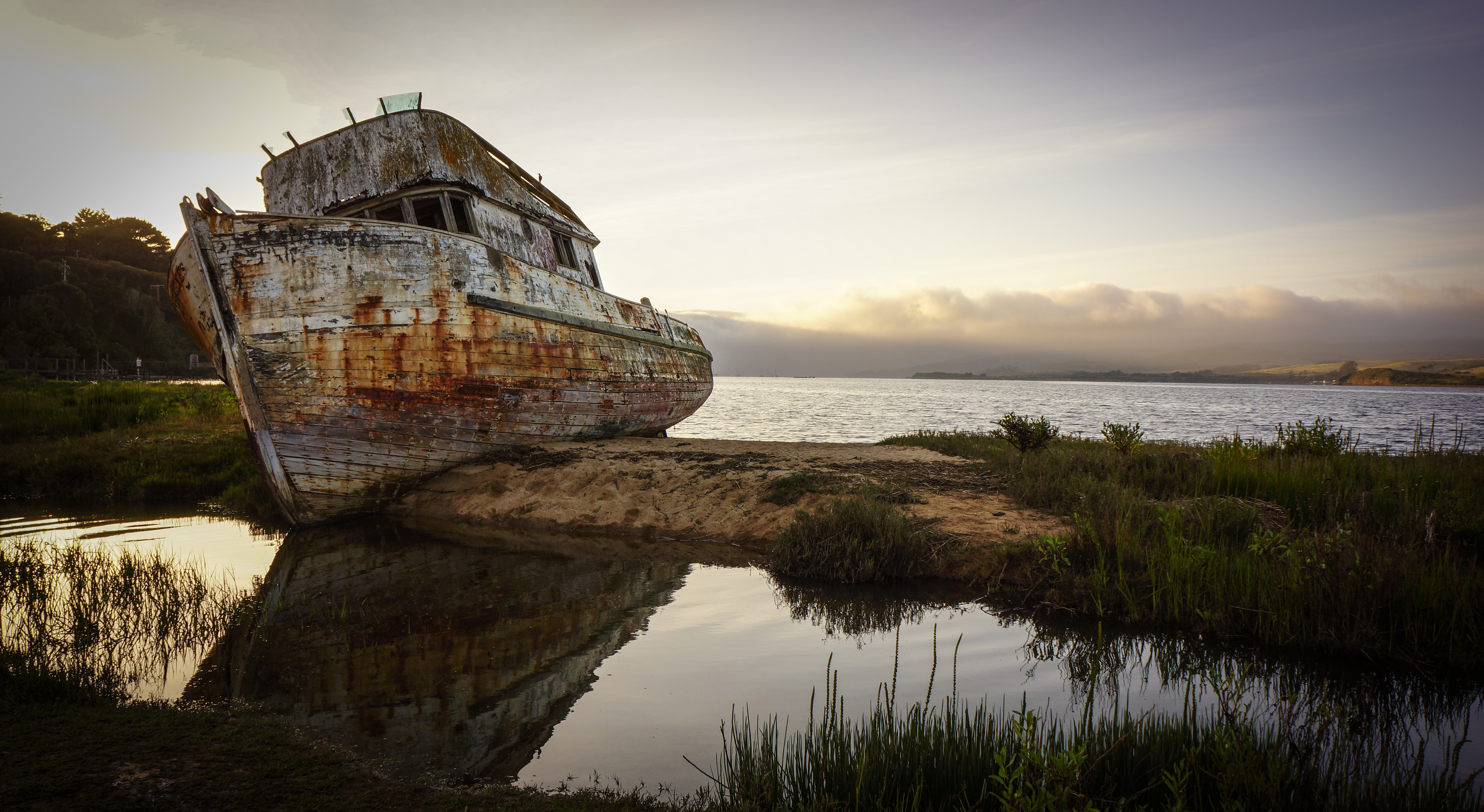
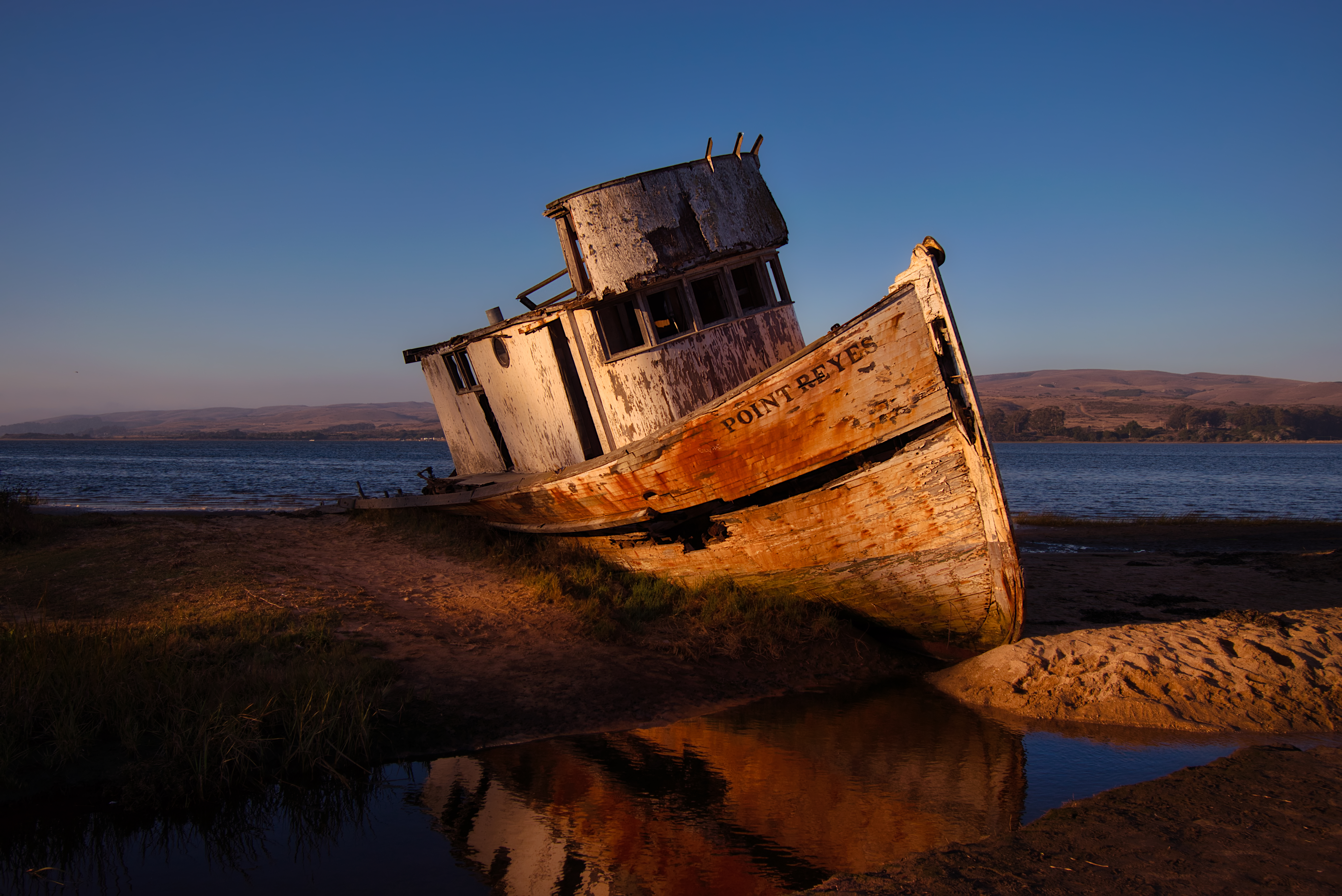
Point Reyes shipwreck

Rumors of Drake's discovery of a safe harbor on the California coast intrigued the Spanish. Their trade between the Philippines and Mexico was booming, and they were constantly seeking safe harbors along their route. Many believe that Drake's discovery of such a harbor inspired the Spanish to order Sebastian Rodriguez Cermeno, a Portuguese captain trading for Spain, to survey the California coast on his journey to Mexico from the Philippines in 1595. Commanding San Agustin, a Manila galleon laden with a luxury cargo of Chinese silks, spices, and Ming porcelain bound for Acapulco, Cermeno endured both the first of hundreds of documented shipwrecks at Point Reyes, as well as one of the most amazing journeys to safety. Among the crew were Filipino mariners.

Struggling with a decrepit, heavily laden ship and a tired crew, Cermeno explored the California coast, eventually anchoring near the Point Reyes inlet now called Drakes Estero. Within a few days, a November storm beached the ship where it listed and was relentlessly pounded by the furious surf. It soon broke apart, killing several men and dumping the precious cargo, some of which was eventually collected and used by the local Coast Miwok inhabitants.

Cermeno salvaged a small, open launch, likened to a large canoe, and loaded it with the 70 surviving crew members to begin the long journey home. After a grueling two-month voyage, remembered as a remarkable feat of seamanship, Cermeno and all crew arrived safely in Acapulco in January 1596. Despite his amazing journey, Cermeno received no celebratory welcome, for he had not only lost his ship and cargo, but had also failed to locate the safe harbor he was ordered to find.

=== Portolá's inland expedition and the establishment of missions, 1769-1843 ===
Despite reports of a lovely land populated by friendly tribes, Spain neglected California until the second half of the 18th century. By that time, trade had become an important source of income, and it was becoming clear that the nation controlling California's harbors would reap incredible profits. When England, France, and Russia began to covet California's coast, the King of Spain knew it was time to fortify it. The Portolá expedition of 67 men and 100 pack mules left San Diego in 1769. Led by Gaspar de Portolá, the governor of Baja California, they began walking to the largest known harbor, Monterey Bay. Portolá expected more of a harbor than what they found at Monterey, and decided they must not have reached it yet. Pushing on north along the coast, they instead discovered San Francisco Bay. Prior to that, from a high point on the coast south of Pacifica, they saw and recognized (from the description of Manila Galleon pilot Cabrera Bueno) Point Reyes and the Farallon Islands. The expedition was blocked from going farther north toward Point Reyes by the Golden Gate and San Francisco Bay, since they had no boats.

Beginning with Portolá's expedition, Spain began establishing presidios and Spanish missions in California ((1769–1833)). By 1817, Mission San Rafael was established and padres began journeying to Point Reyes, intent on enticing the Coast Miwok to the mission. Although they were successful in convincing many to settle at the mission, it was soon clear that the Coast Miwoks were not thriving. Serious outbreaks of smallpox and pneumonia killed many. Those who survived sickened from a wide variety of other illnesses, such as colds and measles. Birth rates dropped, and mortality rates increased at an alarming rate. Since the missions depended upon healthy workers for their prosperity, these illnesses foretold their demise.

In 1821, Mexico gained independence from Spain and possession of California in the Mexican War of Independence. Most mission land was subdivided and into large land grants used mainly for cattle ranching. In 1843, Point Reyes itself and Drake's Bay being mostly unsuitable for cattle, became part of Rancho Punta de los Reyes Sobrante (Sobrante means "leftover"). This was only a few years before cession of California to the United States, which led to decades of confusion and boundary battles.

=== Rancho Tomales y Baulines, 1836-1851 ===
When the Spanish missions in California were dismantled, virtually all of Point Reyes was given to 'Rafael Garcia, a corporal in the Mexican Army, who was awarded two leagues (8,911 acres (3,606 ha)) in March 1836. Named Rancho Tomales y Baulines, it is believed to have included the entire Olema Valley from Tomales Bay to Bolinas Lagoon, although its borders were never clearly defined. Garcia's failure to survey and confirm boundaries, as required by Mexican law, set the stage for confusion and lengthy court battles when the rancho was dissolved.

Unlike many rancheros, Garcia obeyed the law by actually living there. He built a wood and thatch home near what is now the National Seashore's Bear Valley Headquarters and soon had a home for his family as well as a headquarters for his extensive ranching operation which consisted of approximately 3,000 cattle, 400 horses, and large herds of sheep and hogs.

When Mexico lost California to the United States, Garcia continued to prosper. Soon after the American takeover, the 1849 California gold rush brought floods of prospectors. Where his wild cattle had been valued only for hides and tallow, he could now sell them to feed hungry gold-seekers, netting as much as $35 each. Unfortunately for Garcia, these gold-rich years ended quickly: in 1851, the United States passed a law requiring rancheros to prove legal ownership of their land grants. While the Garcias continued ranching, their land began to disappear until, after 15 years of litigation, multiple court appearances, and high legal fees, Garcia had sold all but 3,085 acres (1,248 ha) of his grant at bargain prices.

=== Confused boundaries 1836-1850s ===
Although Garcia believed he owned virtually all of Point Reyes, another Point Reyes land grant was awarded the same year, 1836. It was given to an Irishman, James Berry, who had become a Mexican citizen and colonel in the army. This land grant was also in the Olema Valley, and, to add to the boundary confusion, he soon left the area and hired Garcia to oversee it. A mere two years later, Berry sold nearly 9,000 acres (3,642 ha) of it to a sea captain, Joseph Snook, an act clearly prohibited by Mexican law and grounds for forfeiture of the entire grant. Although Berry understandably wanted to keep the sale secret, Snook wanted legal title. He discovered that the only way he could obtain legal title of the land he had illegally purchased was to formally denounce Berry's ownership on the grounds that he had never occupied it. He was successful and gained legal title to the land he had illegally purchased, stocked it with 56 head of cattle, and, like Berry, hired Garcia to oversee it. Three months after he won legal title, he illegally sold it.

And so began a confusing series of sales and transfers that no one seemed to be able to untangle. Finally, in 1844, the rancheros themselves asked the Mexican government to investigate titles and clarify ownership. Little was clarified, and it was not until the United States took possession of California and required rancheros to conduct surveys and make court appearances to retain their land that the confusing pattern of sales and trades were untangled. Most rancheros were eventually able to prove ownership. Unfortunately, by this time, they had run out of cash and were forced to sell to pay the survey and daunting legal fees. Entrepreneurial Americans were delighted to capitalize on the opportunity. With cash in hand, they purchased these huge Mexican land grants, often paying less than $2 per acre, thus beginning Point Reyes's next chapter as a dairying empire.

=== The Shafter Family, 1854-1937 ===
Settlement patterns at Point Reyes were forever changed when the Shafters acquired it in 1857. Brothers Oscar Lovell Shafter and James McMillan Shafter established large-scale successful dairy operations. 13 of the 31 dairies they established still operate today.

Oscar was the first to arrive. A Vermont lawyer intent upon making his fortune and returning home as soon as possible, he left his family to journey to booming San Francisco. His separation from them became intolerable when his two youngest children died while he was away. Still not willing to give up the promise of wealth, he convinced his wife to come, bringing their surviving daughter. They thrived, and Oscar fathered four more California-born daughters. Oscar soon convinced his younger brother, James, also a lawyer, to join him. They became known as San Francisco's foremost authorities on title litigation. Using their title expertise, they began acquiring Point Reyes land. When Oscar's oldest daughter married Charles Webb Howard, also a lawyer, the trio partnered to transform windswept Point Reyes into prosperous dairies.

Determined to supply booming San Francisco with its butter, by 1857, the partners began fencing significant expanses of land (eventually resulting in 40 miles of fencing), building homes and barns, and stocking the dairies with the pure-bred bulls and rams, some costing over $1,400. By 1868, they had 3,500 cows on 17 dairies and were producing over 700,000 pounds of butter a year. All their dairies were operated by renters. When the most industrious of these renters tried to buy the dairy they worked, they failed. Many eventually left, establishing some of California's other major dairies.

Despite their boundless optimism about the promise of Point Reyes, they were plagued by financial worries. After they passed, their children tried to hold on to the dairies, trying unsuccessfully to stop their decline despite aging ranches, sickening herds, and often unhappy tenants. Finally, in 1937, an era ended when the last of the Shafter Empire was sold, ushering in a new parade of owners.

=== The towns of Point Reyes ===
Four towns can be found on Point Reyes: Bolinas, Olema, Inverness, and Point Reyes Station. During Spanish and Mexican War, Bolinas' remote lagoon was used by American, British, and Russian smugglers intent on avoiding tariffs and regulations. Later, when the Gold Rush of 1849 generated a huge market for lumber, Bolinas became the port for nearby timber operations and, briefly, quarrying limestone. By the late 1960s, Bolinas had become home to a large community of hippies, many of whom had left San Francisco's Haight-Ashbury for a less populated paradise. In 1971, they succeeded in scrapping a master plan calling for a population of 28,000 by imposing a moratorium on new homes and defeating efforts to widen its access highway. Instead, a plan was approved that made agriculture, fishing, and small business the town's economic base. Bolinas soon gained renown for its unusual structures and recreational drug use.

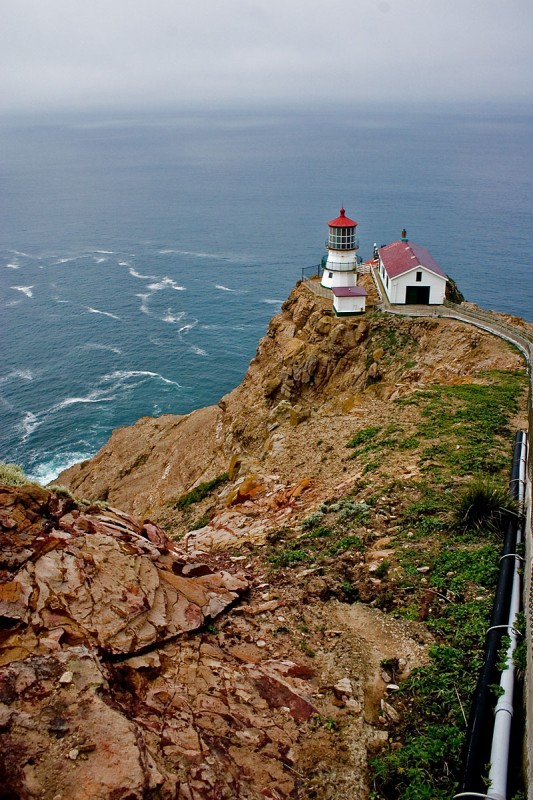
Point Reyes Lighthouse built in 1870

As soon as the Shafter dairies began to thrive, it became evident that Point Reyes needed a centrally located town for supplies, services, and entertainment. In 1857, a hotel and saloon were built and the young town was named "Olema", meaning "coyote" in the Coast Miwok dialect. Within three years, it had emerged as the region's commercial center with a post office, grocery store, saloon, butcher, livery stable, and two hotels. By 1867, a wagon road from San Rafael was built and a stage coach arrived twice a week. Druids Hall was completed in 1885. While this Olema chapter of the United Ancient Order of Druids adhered to principles of mutual support, intellectual growth, and social consciousness, it also served as a temperance society.

The Shafters lobbied hard for a railroad to serve Point Reyes. When it was finally built, it bypassed Olema, terminating two miles (3.2 km) away. When the first train arrived early in 1875, Point Reyes Station was a cow pasture. By 1880, it had a hotel, saloon, blacksmith shop, livery stable, butcher shop, and school. Its post office was completed in 1882, and its first store opened in 1883. When the railroad era ended, growth was slow. It was not until after World War II that a medical center and a shopping center, including a drugstore, dentist, coffee shop, and library, had been completed. The train station became the local post office, while the former engine house was converted into a community center. In the 1970s, hippies established cottage industries in abandoned houses and shops. At the same time, the Coast Guard bought 30 acres (12 ha) of land formerly used as cattle pens, and built military housing. Continuing as the region's supply and service center, it is a popular destination with shops, restaurants, and an annual music festival.

=== 20th century ===
As developers and loggers submitted plans, a 1956 National Park Service (NPS) study of possible seashore parks recommended acquisition of the peninsula. By 1958, a report was published recommending immediate NPS acquisition of 35,000 acres. Controversy raged, with environmentalists applauding the proposal and the ranchers opposing it. A compromise was crafted which allowed the ranchers to lease their land and continue dairying while coexisting with tourists and park activities. On September 13, 1962, President John F. Kennedy signed the bill authorizing the acquisition of 53,000 acres and allocating $13 million. Eventually 18,000 acres purchased by the NPS were leased back to ranchers.

In cooperation with the NPS, volunteers have restored and maintain a historic coastal radiotelegraph marine station, KSM (ex-KPH), at Point Reyes. It remains one of the few commercial Morse code stations operating in the world, and is the only one in the U.S.

During the Cold War, submarines repaired at Mare Island Naval Shipyard were tested in the shallow waters off Point Reyes following shipyard repairs. Navy safety personnel used a small monitoring and communications hut on the peninsula for monitoring submarines during these sea trials.

In April and May 1979, part of John Carpenter's The Fog was shot at the Point Reyes Lighthouse and the small town of Inverness.

As of 2015, Drakes Bay Oyster Company (DBOC) has ceased operations, and most infrastructure has been removed from the site. The closure comes as a result of their lease ending.

== Ecology ==
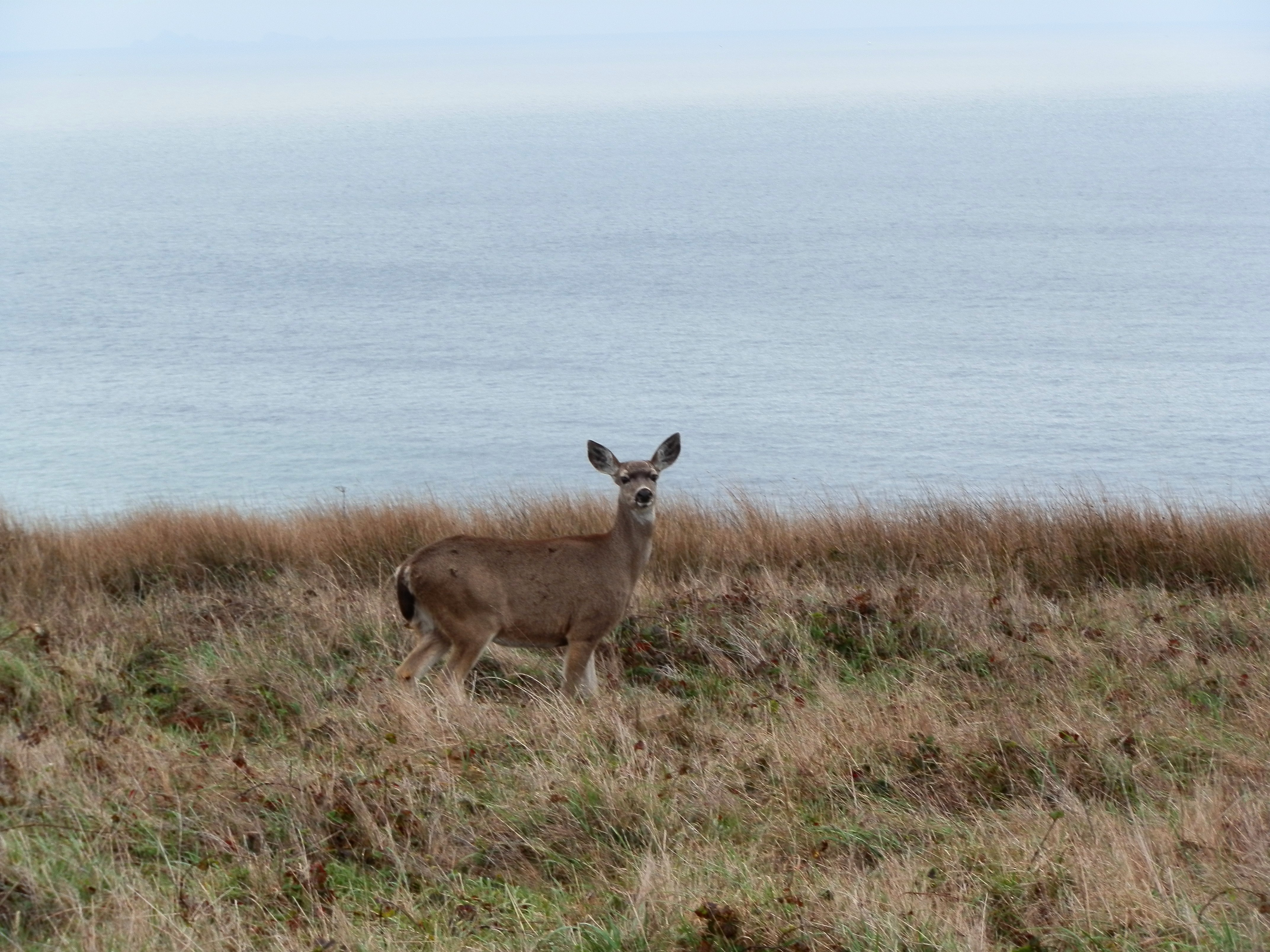
A female black-tailed deer at Point Reyes

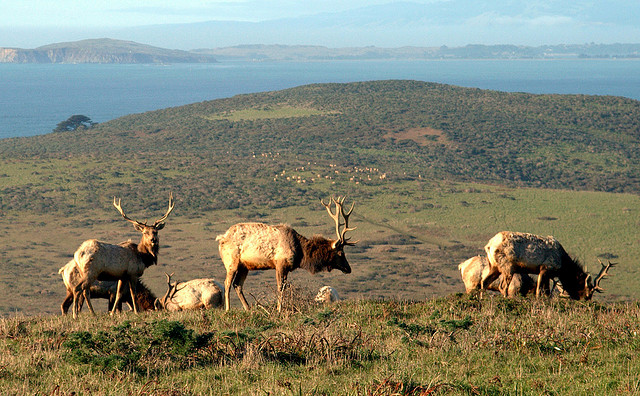
Male tule elk grazing at Point Reyes

Beginning in the 18th century, northern elephant seals (Mirounga angustirostris) were hunted extensively almost to extinction by the end of the 19th century. They were prized for oil that could be made from their blubber, and the population may have fallen as low as 20. In 1874 American whaleman Charles Melville Scammon recorded in Marine Mammals of the Northwestern Coast of America, that "the elephant seal...known to the Old Californians as Elefante marino had a geographical distribution from Cape Lazaro (about 1/4 of the way up the Baja peninsula) in the south to Point Reyes in the north". They were thought to be extinct in 1884 until a remnant population of eight individuals was discovered on Guadalupe Island in 1892 by a Smithsonian expedition, who promptly killed seven of the eight for their collections. The elephant seals managed to survive, and were finally protected by the Mexican government in 1922. Subsequently, the U.S. protection was strengthened after passage of the Marine Mammal Protection Act in 1972, and numbers have now recovered to over 100,000. The first breeding pair was discovered on a sheltered beach below Point Reyes' Chimney Rock in 1981 and has multiplied at a remarkable 16% per year to the present population of 1,500 to 2,000 individuals each winter.

California's native tule elk (Cervus canadensis nannodes) were hunted until only a handful of animals remained in California's southern Central Valley. Joseph Warren Revere, the grandson of Revolutionary War patriot Paul Revere, wrote in his book Naval Duty in California that he counted 400 elk in a single herd on Pt. Reyes in the 1840's. Stephen J. Richardson, son of Marin County pioneer Captain William A. Richardson, wrote "I think the largest herd in the world roamed over the deep grasslands of Point Reyes...I fully believe there were a thousand elk in one herd." Although they had been completely extirpated from Point Reyes, in 1978, ten elk were reintroduced to Point Reyes from the San Luis National Wildlife Refuge near Los Banos. By 2009, the population climbed to over 440 elk at Tomales Point's 2,600 acres (1,100 ha) of coastal scrub and grasslands. In 1999, 100 elk from Tomales Point were moved to the Limantour wilderness area of the Seashore and above Drakes Beach to Ranch A, as that ranch's long-term lease expired and was not renewed. The drought in 2012–2015 was also a threat to the elk confined north of the fence on Tomales Point, with nearly half the elk there dying from lack of water. In 2012 there were 540 elk, then only 357 in 2013, and by 2014 only 286. In August and September 2020, drought and wildfires again threaten the Tomales Point elk, leading some conservationists to illegally bring water to the elk north of the fence. Half of the ten Point Reyes dairy cattle herds were infected with paratuberculosis (aka Johne's Disease) along with exotic deer in a 1977 study. Tule elk became infected within two years of their reintroduction to the peninsula with this disease, which was brought to North America with Eurasian cattle. Another nonnative, bacterial disease, brucellosis, can induce abortions in pregnant cattle, elk, and bison, and was also brought to North America by importation of Eurasian cattle. Pt. Reyes cattle have also infected the tule elk population.

Non-native axis deer and fallow deer (originally from India and Asia Minor, respectively) used to inhabit Point Reyes, where they competed with native black-tailed deer (Odocoileus hemionus columbianus). A doctor bought the axis and fallow deer from the San Francisco Zoo in 1948 for his 5,000-acre hunting club, which later became part of the national seashore. In 2006, the park embarked on a plan to eradicate the non-native deer via contraception and culling, which succeeded despite controversy, over a twenty year program.

Vegetation native to Point Reyes includes bishop pine, Douglas-fir, coyote brush, monkeyflower, poison oak, California blackberry, salal and coast redwood, among others. Nearly 490 different species of birds have been observed in the park and on adjacent waters.

Tule elk within this region primarily consume native grasses and forbs such as Nassella pulchra. This is an essential aspect that helps maintain the biodiversity of the grassland ecosystem. The interaction between these plants and the elk helps prevent the encroachment of invasive shrubs and non-native species. An example of a species that can be prevented through the grazing of the elk is Holcus lanatus.

By grazing the land, the elk promote native species to flourish. This action allows for the open grassland to be sustained and supports the overall ecosystem. This interaction is a core aspect that highlights the important of preserving the ecological balance at Point Reyes.

== Geology ==
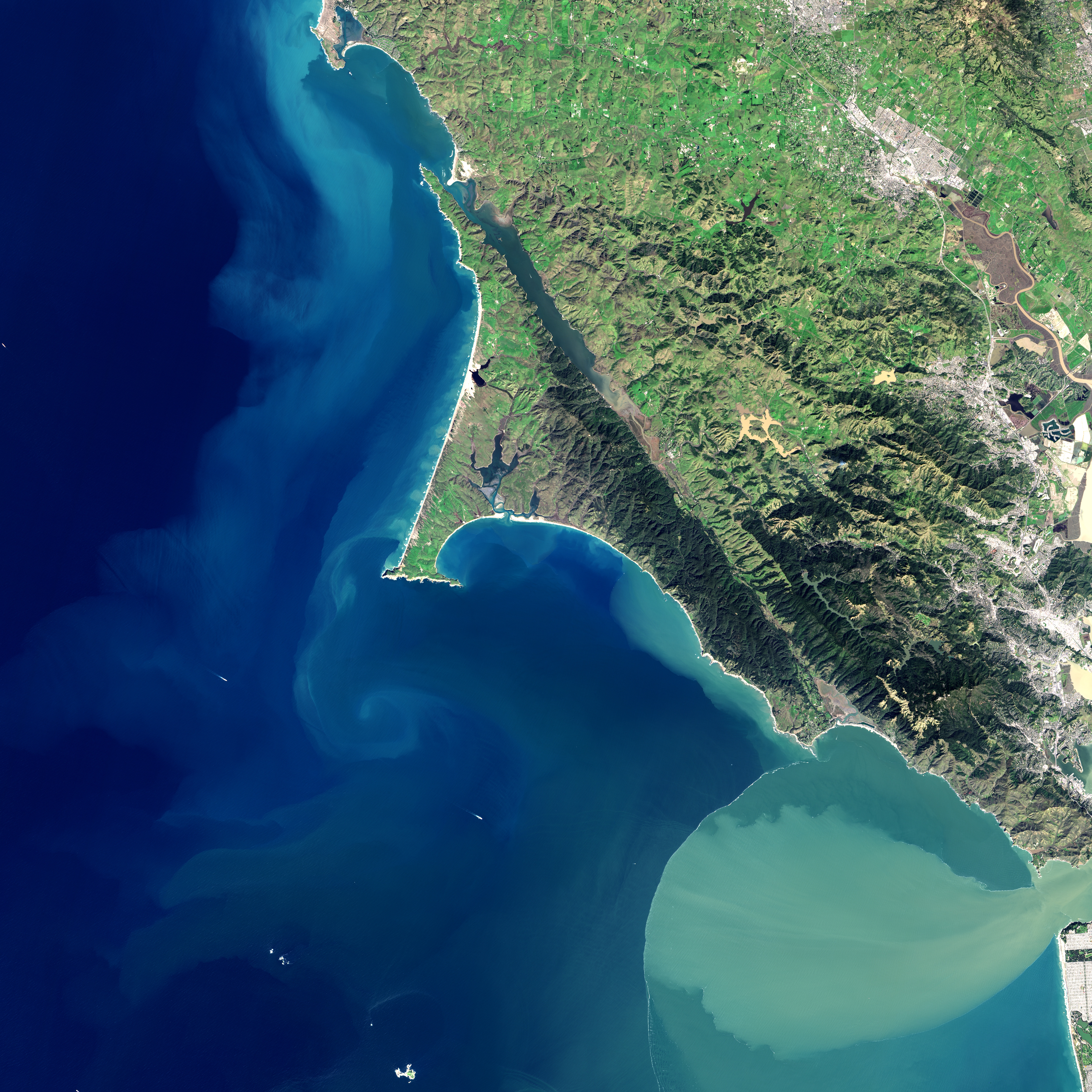
Satellite photo of Point Reyes

The entire Point Reyes Peninsula is a piece of the Salinian Block transported northward by the San Andreas Fault. Its core is granite, unlike the terrain east of Tomales Bay. The granite rocks that form the peninsula were once contiguous with the Tehachapi Mountains, which is located 350 mi (563 km) south of here. In the 1906 earthquake, Point Reyes moved north 21 ft (6.4 m).

=== Geologic History ===
Point Reyes is bounded to the east by the San Andreas Fault, which runs directly under Tomales Bay, and is structurally dominated by the Point Reyes Syncline. The Point Reyes Peninsula is on the Pacific Plate, while the rest of Marin County land is on the North American Plate. The peninsula is a member of the Salinian Block, a segment of the southernmost Sierra Nevada range transported north from Southern California by movement along the San Andreas fault. This separation is visible through the flow of the Pine Gulch Creek and Olema Creek, the former on the west side emptying into Bolinas Lagoon to the south, and the latter on the east side emptying into Tomales Bay to the north, the two rivers separated by half a kilometer at the same elevation. Simply speaking, the peninsula consists of three major members: the Salinian Cretaceous crystalline basement, the overlying Pliocene sedimentary rocks, and the late Pleistocene marine terrace deposits of the southern peninsula.

The geological history of Point Reyes can be traced back through rock analysis, layers by layers, to the Late Jurassic. The Porphyritic granodiorite of the Point Reyes area dates back to the Late Jurassic. During this period, the oceanic Farallon plate and North American continental plate were converging, where the Farallon plate was being subducted. These rocks, part of the Salinian block, crystallized approximately 80 to 100 million years ago. K-Ar dating conducted in 1979 is giving an age of 82.0 Ma (Late Cretaceous) to the Point Reyes granodiorite. The oldest sedimentary rocks above the granitic basement on the peninsula are the Point Reyes Conglomerate. It dates from the early Eocene age (about 50 million years) and was deposited as deep-water sediment gravity flows (turbidites and debris flows), likely in a submarine canyon complex.

=== Tectonic Plate Movements ===
Approximately 29 million years ago, the North American continent overrode the East Pacific Rise. The San Andreas Fault is the classic boundary between the Pacific Plate (Point Reyes Peninsula) and the North American Plate (Marin County to the east). Documented displacement on the San Andreas Fault system in northern California amounts to 305 km since the Early Miocene. However, when considering other major faults in the region, the total slip of the Point Reyes area is much greater. The Point Reyes Conglomerate is identical to the Carmelo Formation at Point Lobos, suggesting additional displacement of 150 km along the San Gregorio fault, giving a total slip in the Point Reyes area of 455 km.

=== 1906 Earthquake ===
G.K. Gilbert studied the San Andreas Fault at Point Reyes immediately after the quake. Within weeks, he measured the displacement of man-made features like fences, roads, and rows of trees in Marin County. Lateral offsets of 3.4 to 6.1 m were observed all throughout the region of Point Reyes.

== Climate ==
The U.S. Weather Bureau (now the National Weather Service) maintained a cooperative weather station in the Point Reyes lighthouse from 1914 to 1943, though temperatures were only tracked through 1926. Based on those records, average January temperatures ranged from 45.1 to 54.1 °F (7.3 to 12.3 °C) and average September temperatures ranged from 51.7 to 61.0 °F (10.9 to 16.1 °C). The highest temperature recorded was 90 °F (32 °C) on October 3, 1917, and the lowest temperature recorded was 31 °F (−1 °C) on January 19, 1922. Annual precipitation averaged 17.05 inches (433 mm). The wettest year on record was 1941 with 31.37 inches (797 mm) and the driest year was 1923 was 7.32 inches (186 mm). The most precipitation in one month was 9.51 inches (242 mm) in December 1916. The maximum 24-hour precipitation was 2.65 inches (67 mm) on December 15, 1929. Automated weather observations are now taken at the lighthouse. Weather observations are also taken in nearby Point Reyes Station and published in local newspapers, including the San Francisco Chronicle.

Climate data for Point Reyes (1914–1943; temperatures 1917–1926)
Month	Jan	Feb	Mar	Apr	May	Jun	Jul	Aug	Sep	Oct	Nov	Dec	Year
Record high °F (°C)	78 (26)	75 (24)	76 (24)	81 (27)	80 (27)	84 (29)	75 (24)	72 (22)	88 (31)	90 (32)	79 (26)	70 (21)	90 (32)
Mean daily maximum °F (°C)	54.2 (12.3)	54.1 (12.3)	53.8 (12.1)	54.5 (12.5)	54.4 (12.4)	56.7 (13.7)	57.6 (14.2)	57.9 (14.4)	61.0 (16.1)	61.0 (16.1)	59.4 (15.2)	55.4 (13.0)	56.7 (13.7)
Mean daily minimum °F (°C)	45.1 (7.3)	45.9 (7.7)	45.4 (7.4)	46.3 (7.9)	46.7 (8.2)	48.3 (9.1)	49.4 (9.7)	50.4 (10.2)	51.2 (10.7)	50.7 (10.4)	49.9 (9.9)	46.8 (8.2)	48.0 (8.9)
Record low °F (°C)	31 (−1)	38 (3)	35 (2)	39 (4)	40 (4)	40 (4)	47 (8)	45 (7)	47 (8)	47 (8)	43 (6)	34 (1)	31 (−1)
Average precipitation inches (mm)	3.41 (87)	3.05 (77)	1.94 (49)	1.23 (31)	0.66 (17)	0.25 (6.4)	0.04 (1.0)	0.03 (0.76)	0.36 (9.1)	1.03 (26)	1.73 (44)	3.32 (84)	17.05 (432.26)
Source: Western Regional Climate Center

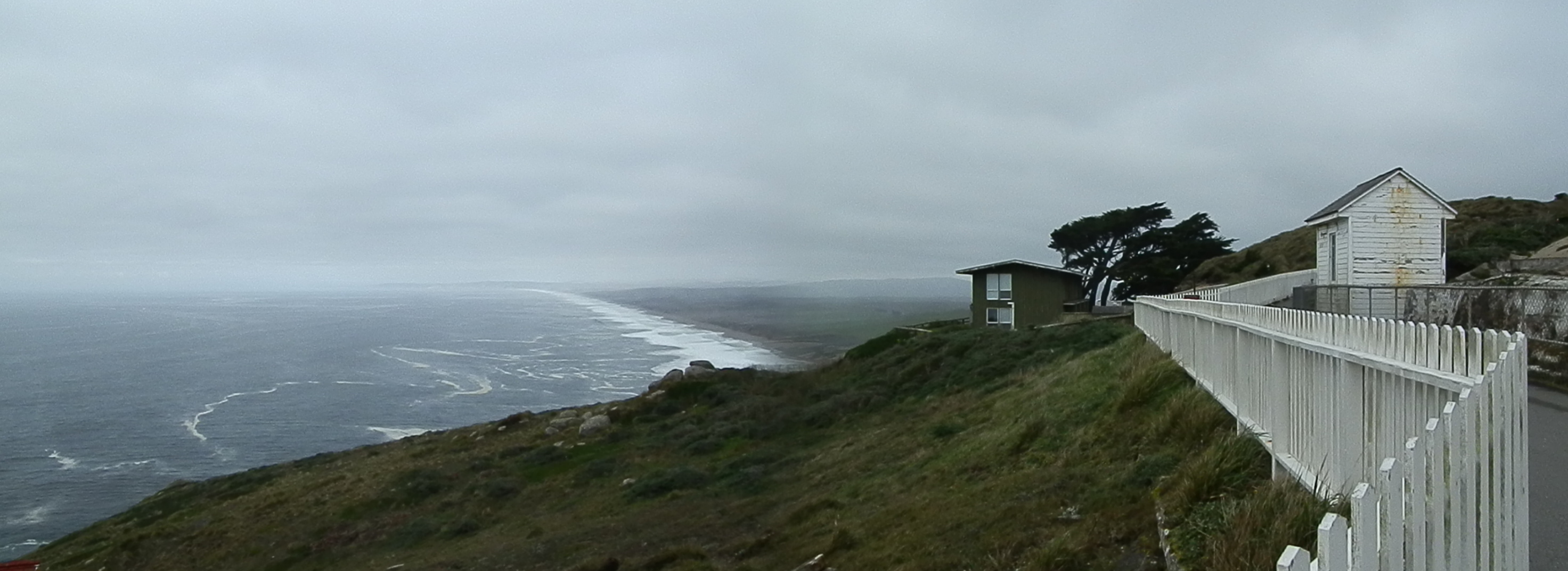
Point Reyes South Beach on foggy day

=== Fog ===
It can get very foggy and windy during certain parts of the year at the lighthouse, and to be effective, the lighthouse had to be situated below the characteristic high fog. When foggy, visibility is so slim that one cannot even view the lighthouse from the top of the approximately 300 steps necessary to walk down to reach it.

The lighthouse serves a great purpose in such a foggy area, as there is no beach to wash up on; it is on a rocky cliff. Day or night, the light may be the only thing visible to ships.

== Recreation ==
The peninsula is a popular recreational destination for the nearby San Francisco Bay Area, especially for hiking on its many trails and sea kayaking the shores of Tomales Bay and the coast. There are close to 150 miles (241 km) of trails, including the popular Bear Valley Trail, which starts from the Visitor Center. Point Reyes National Seashore offers some of the finest birdwatching in the United States. It is also one of the best places to watch northern elephant seals in the winter months. More than 70,000 acres (300 km^{2}) of habitat harbor an incredible variety of bird life. There are also popular oyster farms on and near the peninsula.

Stairway to Point Reyes Lighthouse

Point Reyes Lighthouse in fog

Tule elk grazing by the seaside

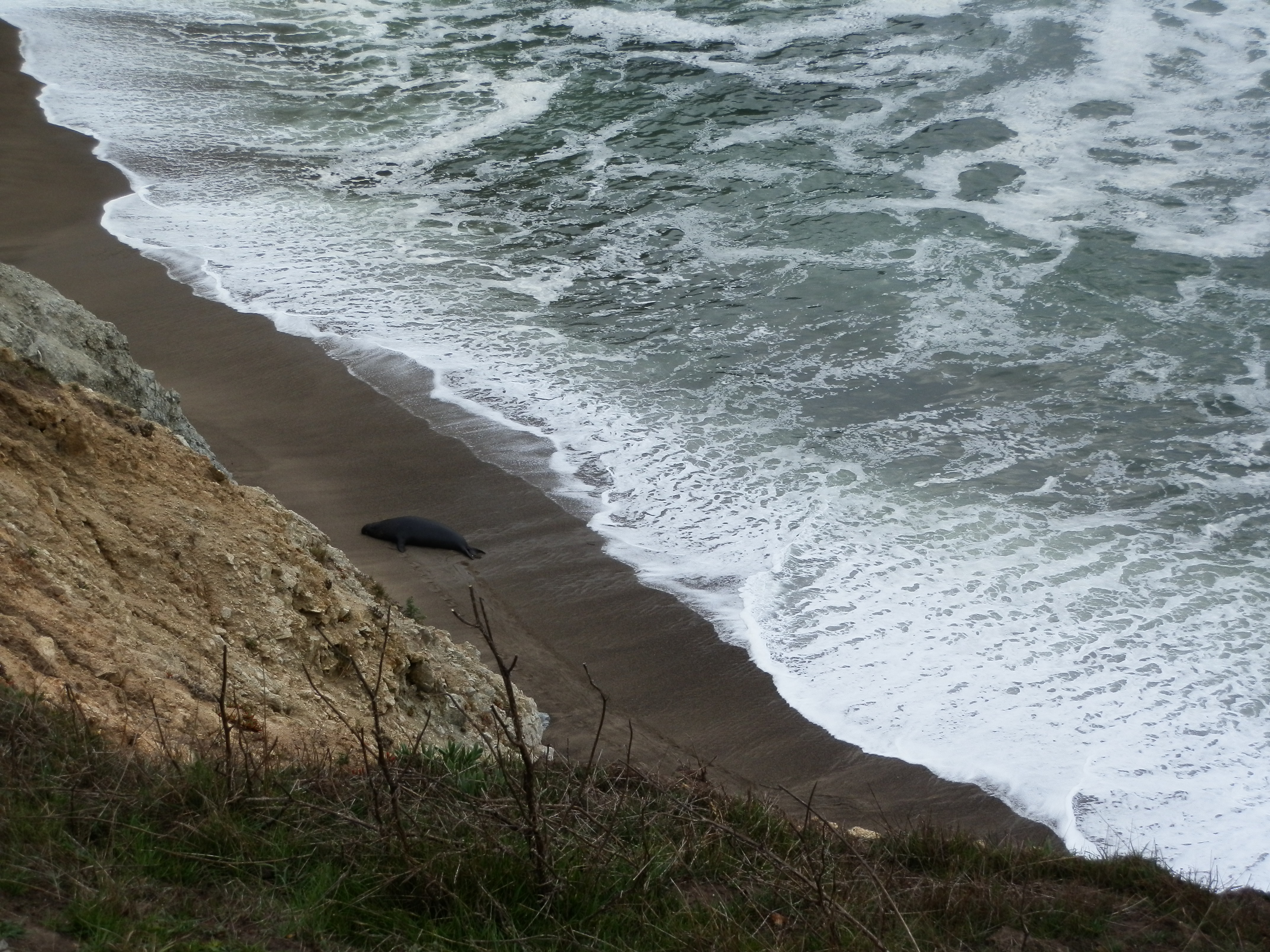
An elephant seal on the beach

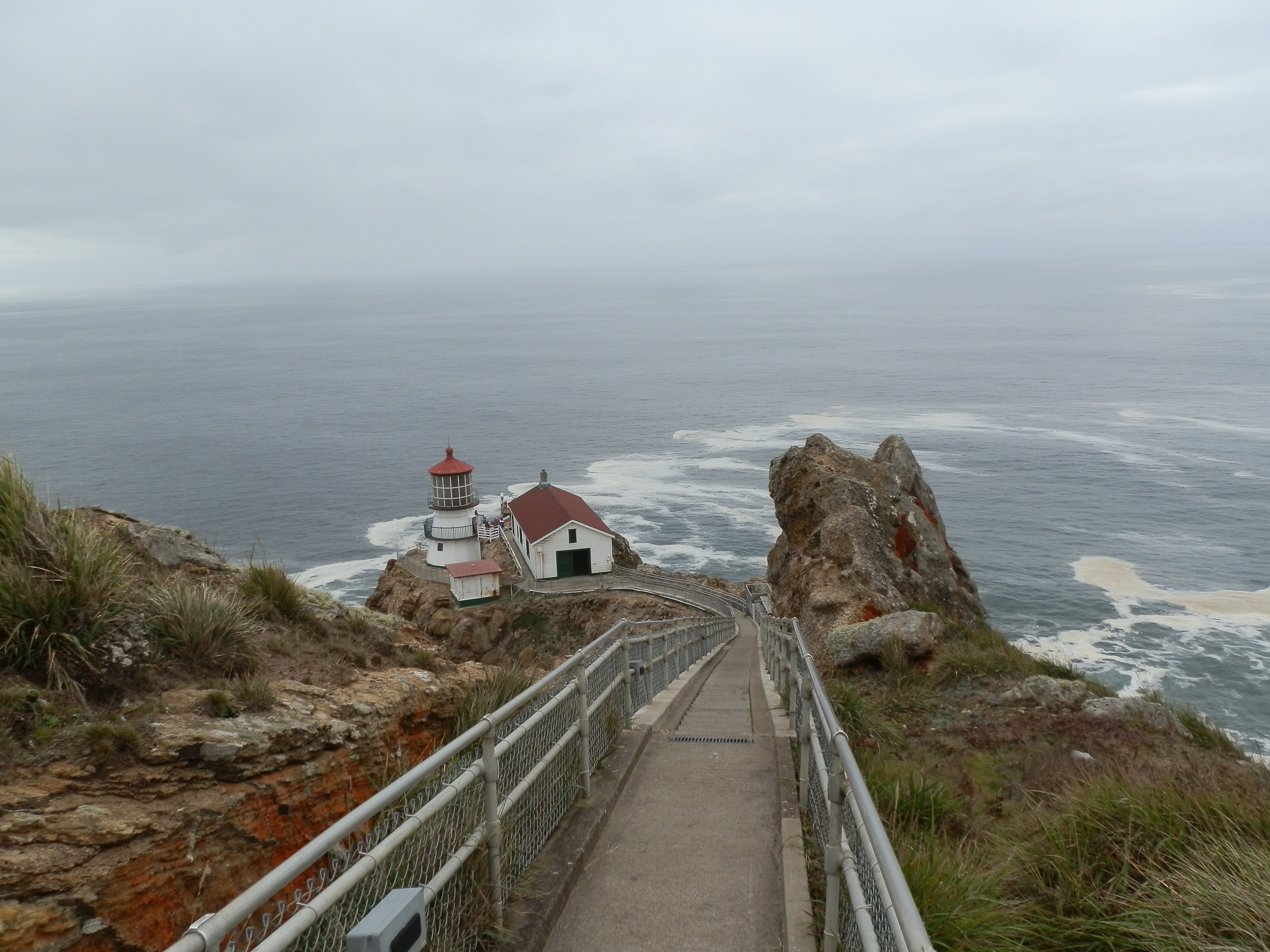
Point Reyes on a foggy day

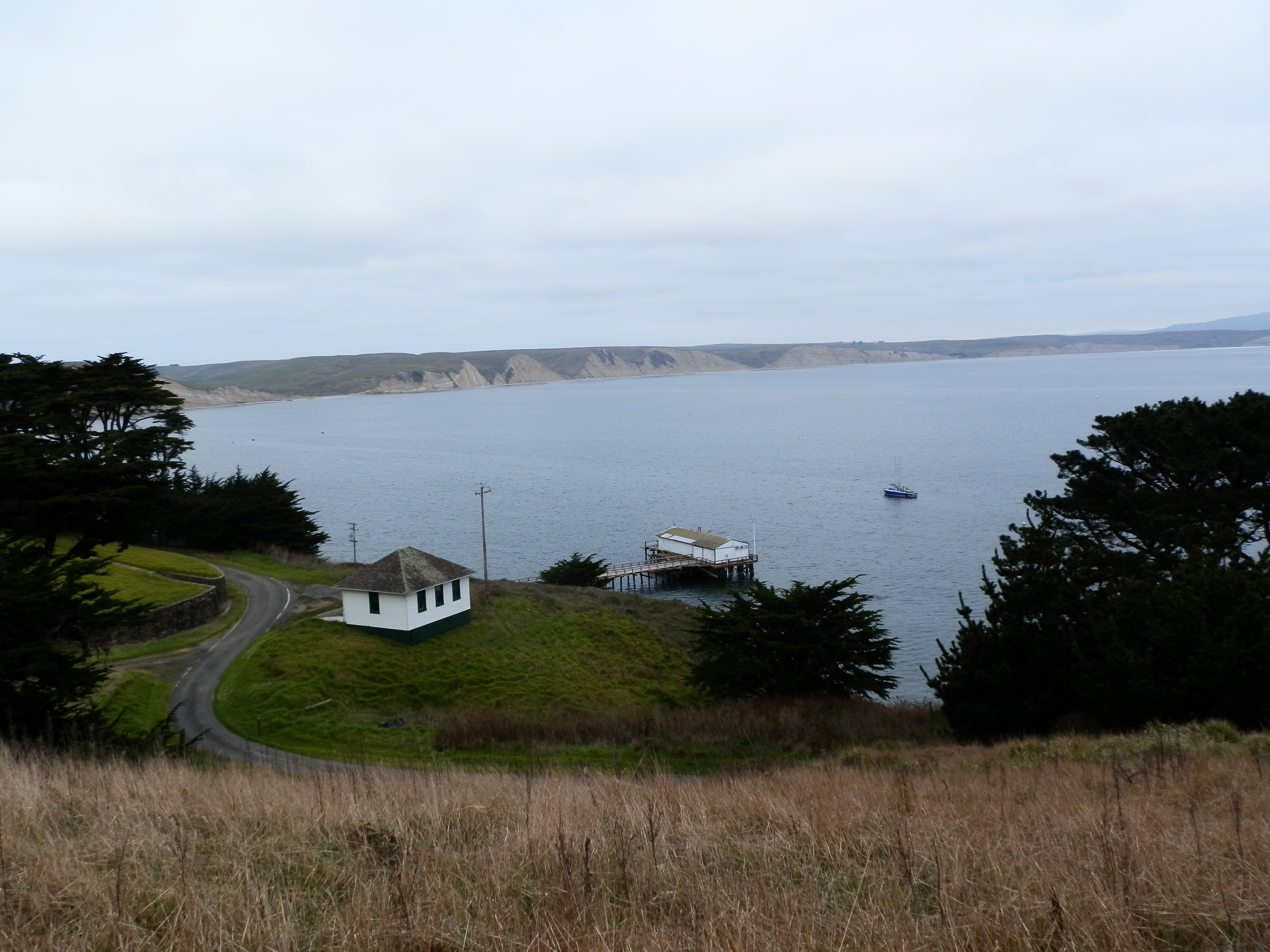
Point Reyes seashore

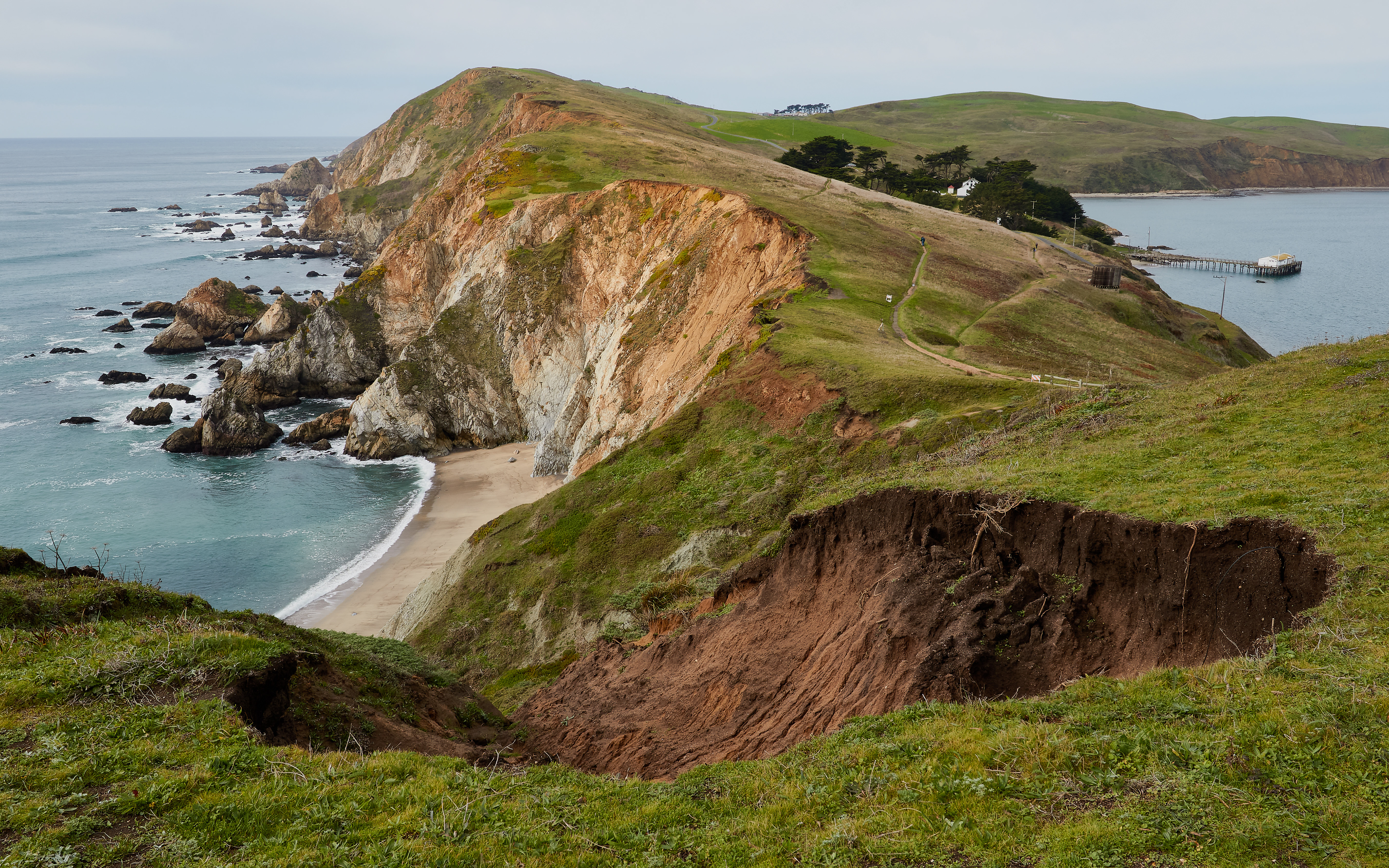
Coastline as seen from Chimney Rock
