= José Calistro =

- Born: c. 1838; Marin County, California, USA
- Died: 1875; Marin County, California, USA
- Occupation: Chief of Rancho Nicasio

José Calistro (c. 1838 – 1875) was the last chief of the Coast Miwok community who resided at Rancho Nicasio, which was once a Native American rancho that stretched from present-day Nicasio, California to Tomales Bay.

In 1870, he secured the deed to 30 acres (120,000 m^{2}) of land at Halleck Creek, what was left of the original Rancho, for his community of 500 people to live.
