= Tsupu =

Coast Miwok elder

- Born: c. 1815; Petaluma
- Died: 1890
- Known for: Last native of the ancient village of Petaluma

Tsupu (c. 1815–1890), also known as Wild Cucumber, Maria Chekka, and Maria Chica, was a Coast Miwok elder. She was the last native of the ancient village of Petaluma, which was east of the Petaluma River and about three and a half miles northeast of the present city of Petaluma, California. It was part of Lekatuit Nation and had around 500 residents. "Petaluma" means "sloping ridge" in the Coast Miwok language.

One of Tsupu's sons later said that she was "half Petaluma, half Tomales, half Bodega." It is thought that Tsupu's father came from Petaluma and her mother came from a village in Olamentke Nation. Growing up, she was educated by her grandparents.

In 1834, Mexican General Mariano Guadalupe Vallejo established his Rancho headquarters, an adobe fort now known as Rancho Petaluma Adobe, in eastern Lekatuit territory. Tsupu and many others were enslaved as builders, molested, and tortured. Many died, as smallpox spread through the area.

Eventually, Tsupu escaped Petaluma and traveled fifty miles north to Fort Ross, where she married a man of Russian, Aleut, and Kashaya Pomo heritage named Tintic Comtechal. She spent the rest of her life around Sonoma County. While living in Bodega Bay, she became the maid and mistress of a sea captain, Steven Smith, who built the first steam-generated saw mill on the West Coast. She gave her children with Comtechal Smith's last name to protect them from slave traders, and had two more children with Smith. Shortly after Smith's death, she rejoined Comtechal.

Tsupu had six children. One of her descendants, Greg Sarris, is a novelist and the Tribal Chairman of the Federated Indians of Graton Rancheria.

The village of Péta Lúuma was abandoned once and for all after the 1838 smallpox epidemic.
