= Tomales Point =

Headland in California, United States

Coordinates: 38.240854°N 122.995139°W

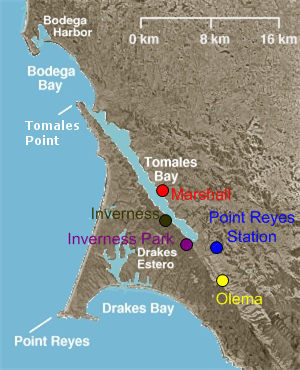
Tomales Point on Point Reyes Peninsula

Tomales Point (Coast Miwok: Kulupi Tamal) is the North-Western tip of Point Reyes Peninsula. Bodega Bay is to the North, Tomales Bay is to the East, and the Pacific Ocean is to the West. The point is accessible only via a 9.5 mile hike (out and back) along Tomales Point Trail. The region is home to a tule elk population.

== Gallery ==
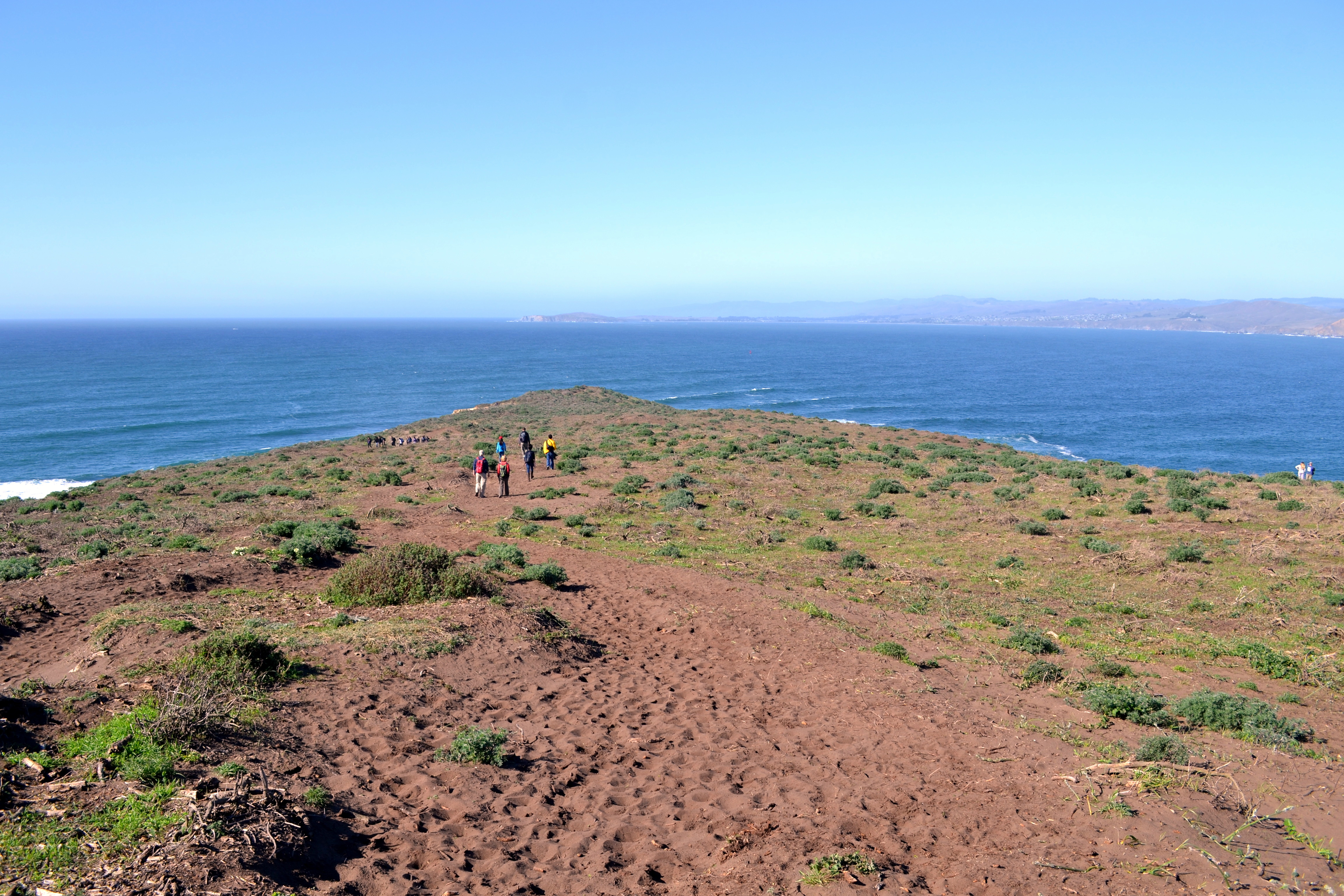
Tomales Point with Bodega Bay in the distance

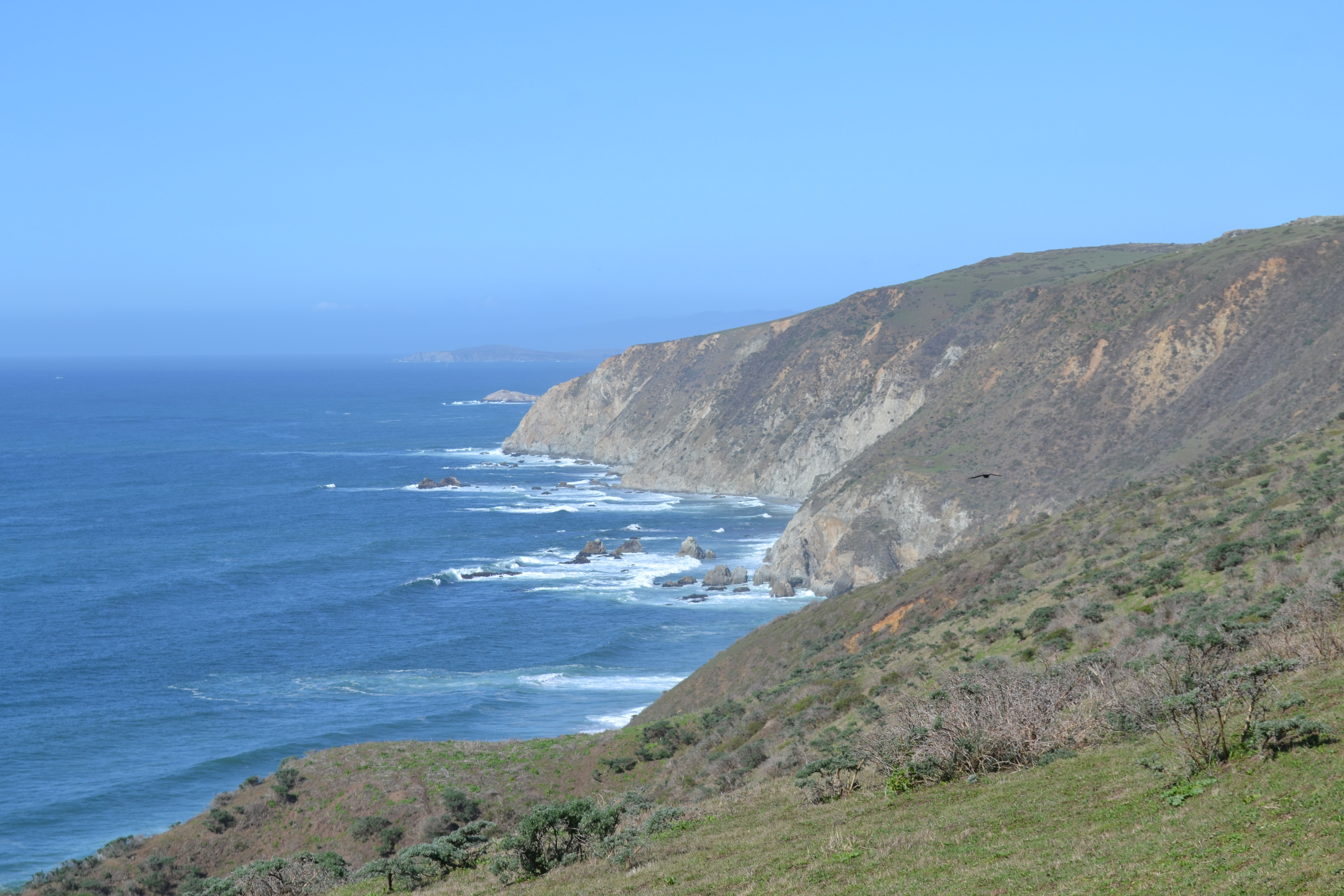
Western edge of Point Reyes Peninsula on Tomales Point Trail

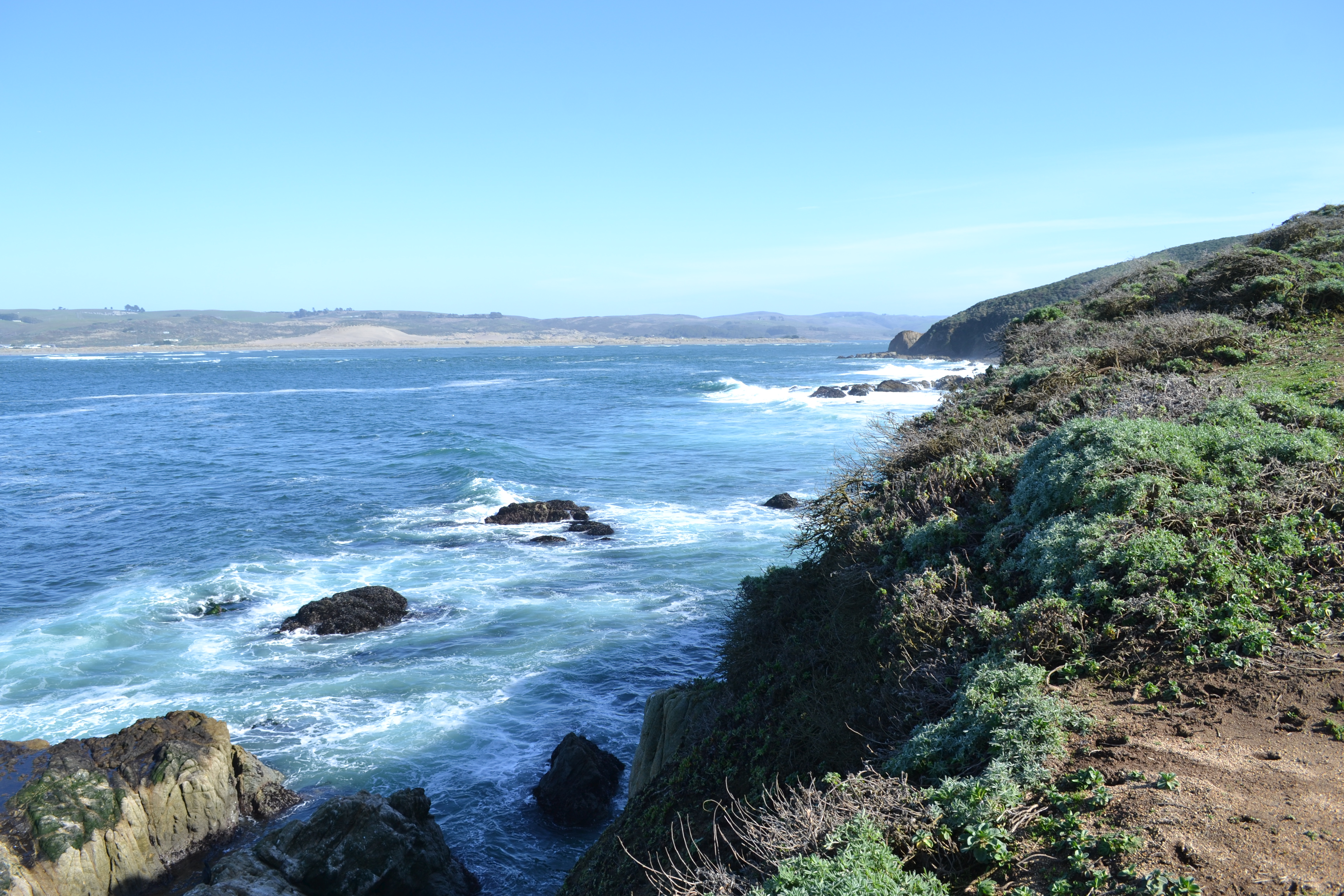
Entrance to Tomales Bay as viewed from Tomales Point

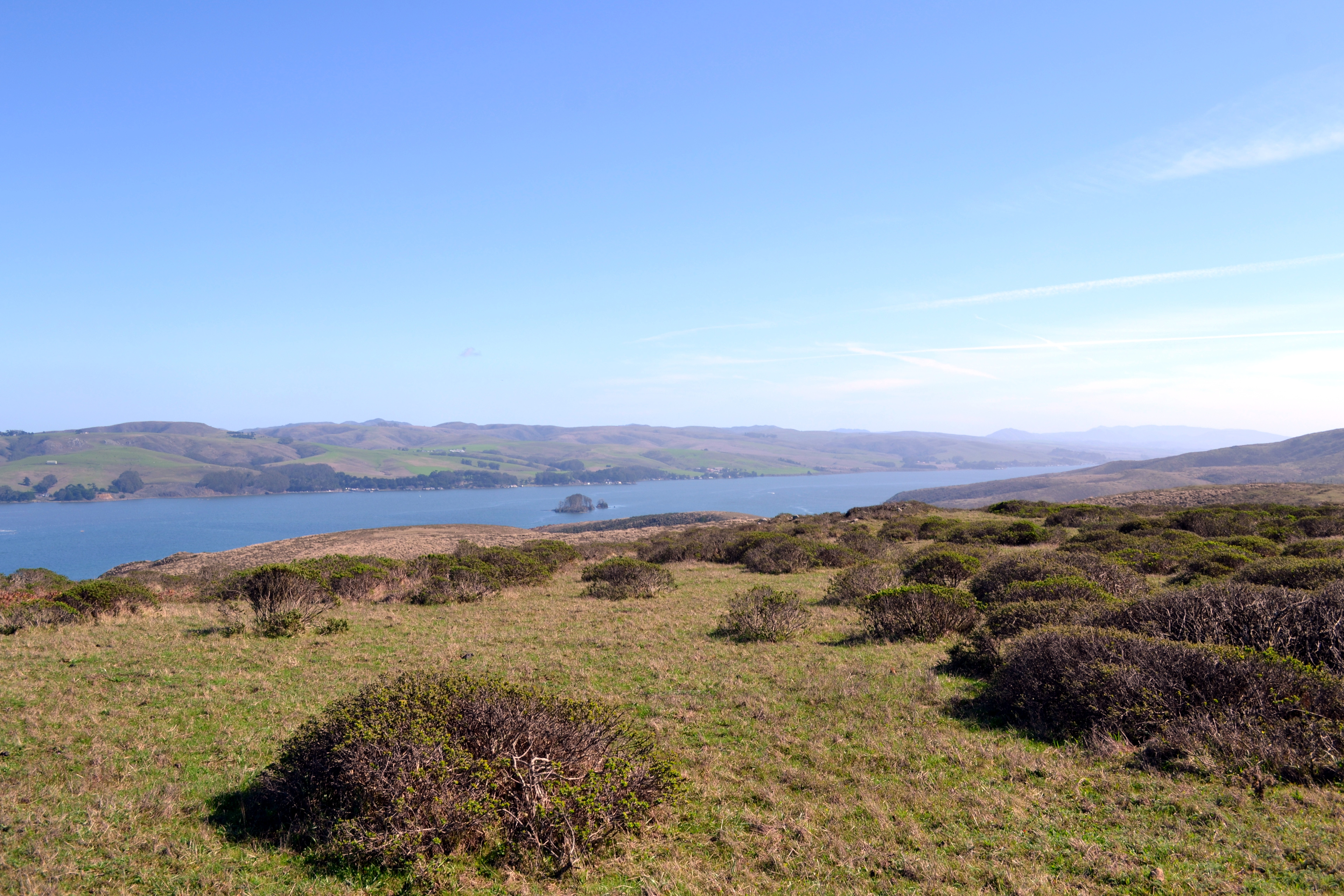
Tomales Bay

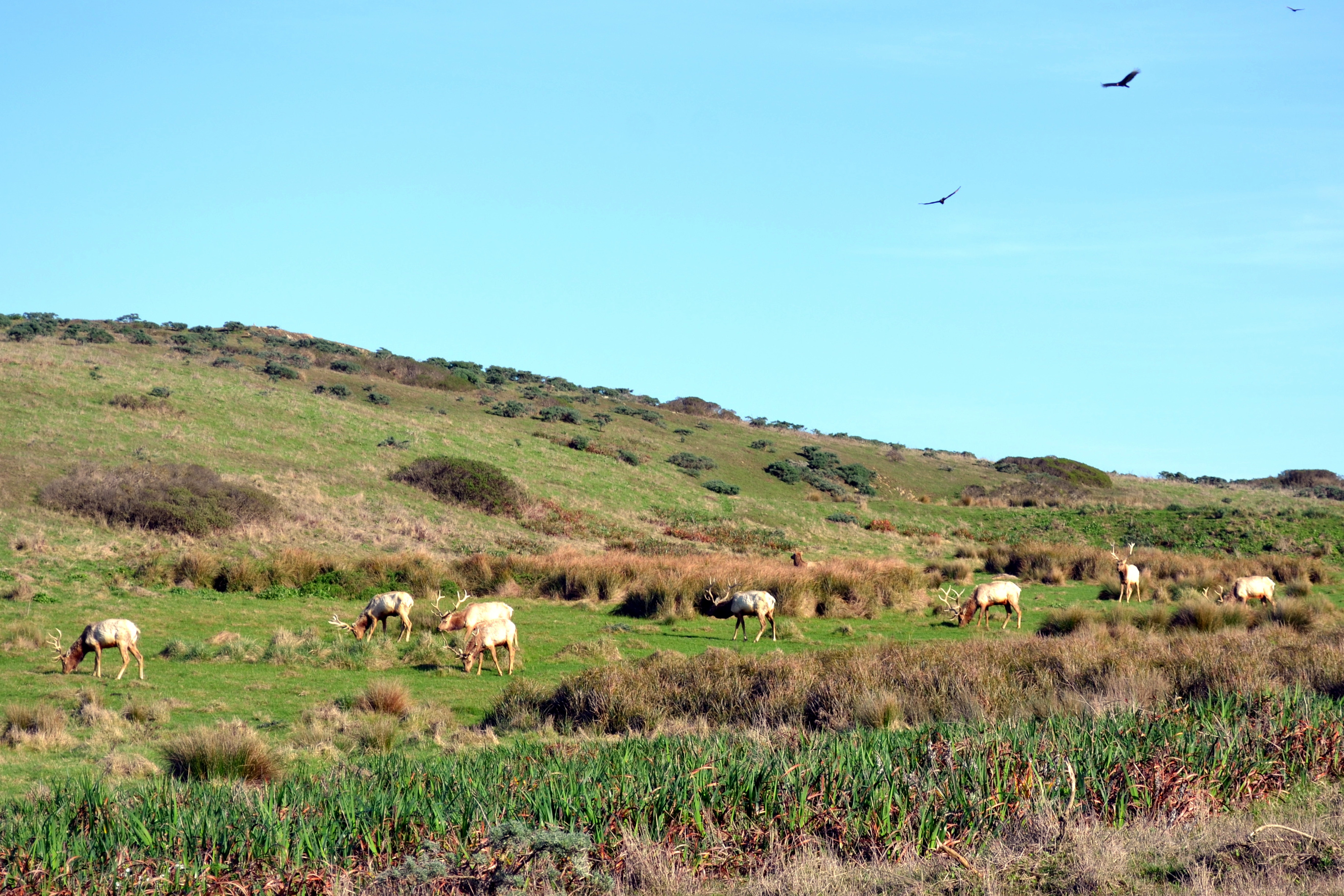
Herd of tule elk on Tomales Point Trail

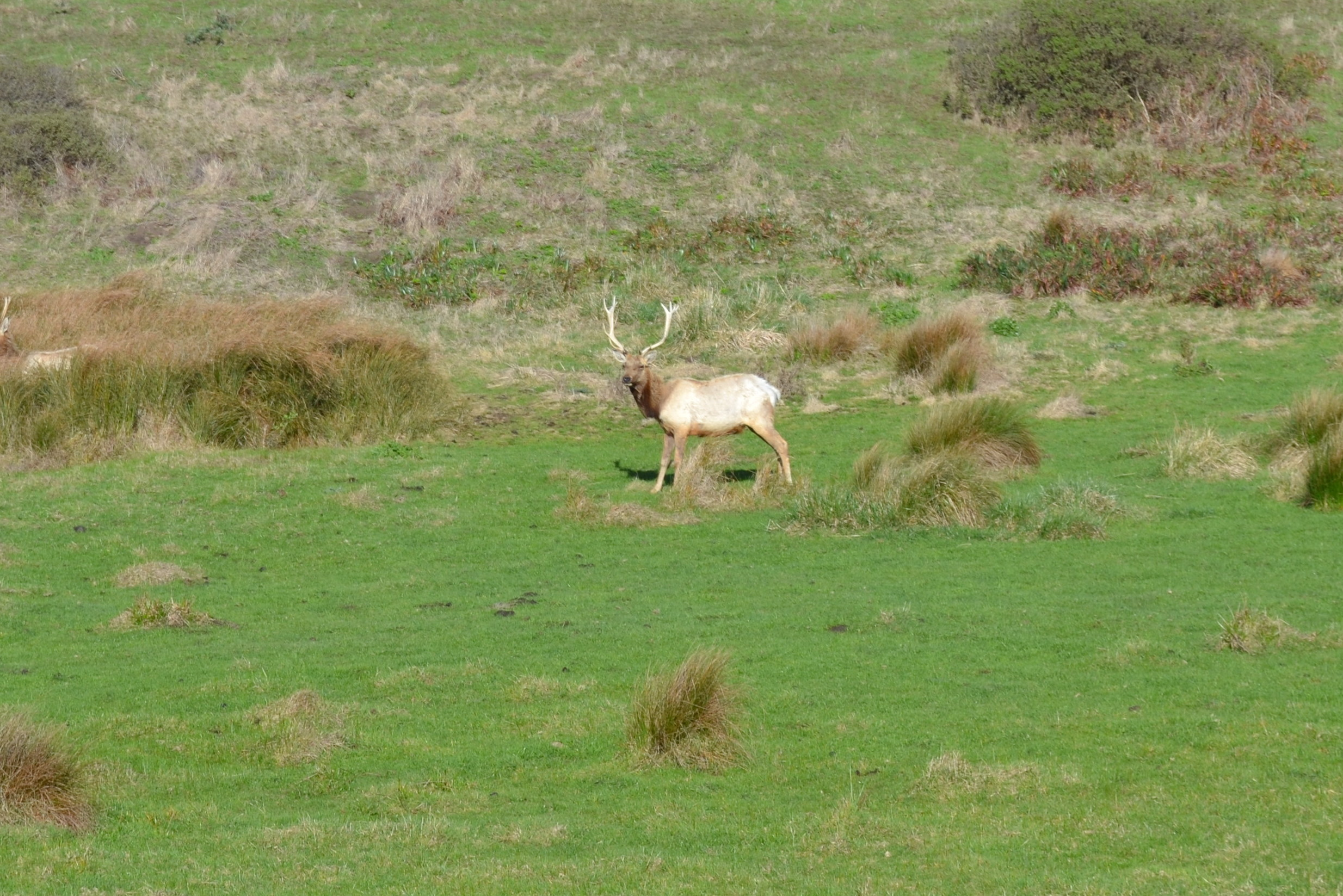
A male tule elk
