= Coast Miwok =

Tribe of Native American people

Coast Miwok People
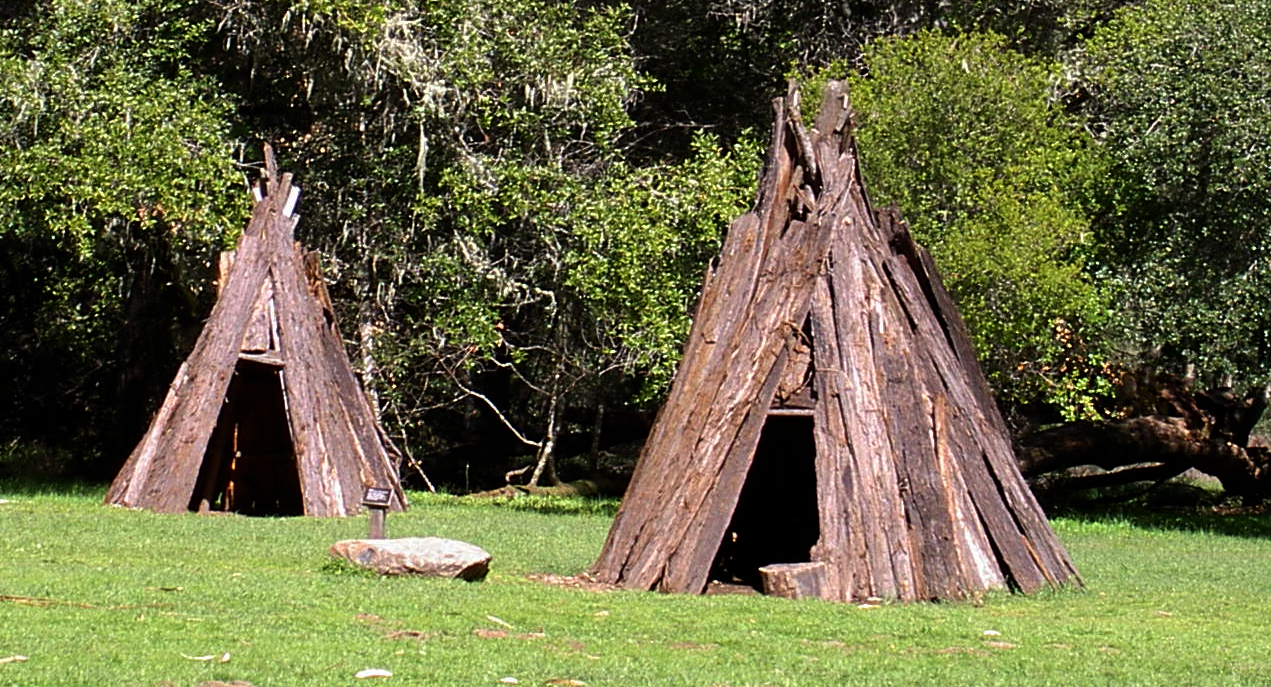
- Modern reconstructions of Coast Miwok shelters at Kule Loklo

Total population
- 1770: 2,000; 1850: 250; 1880: 60; 2000: 167

Regions with significant populations
- California: Marin County Sonoma County

Languages
- Utian: Coast Miwok

Religion
- Shamanism: Kuksu: Miwok mythology

Related ethnic groups
- Miwok Plains & Sierra Miwok; Lake Miwok Bay Miwok

The Coast Miwok are an Indigenous people of California that were the second-largest tribe of the Miwok people. Coast Miwok inhabited the general area of present-day Marin County and southern Sonoma County in Northern California, from the Golden Gate north to Duncans Point and eastward to Sonoma Creek. Coast Miwok included the Bodega Bay Miwok, or Olamentko (Olamentke), from authenticated Miwok villages around Bodega Bay, the Marin Miwok, or Hookooeko (Huukuiko), and Southern Sonoma Miwok, or Lekahtewutko (Lekatuit). While they did not have an overarching name for themselves, the Coast Miwok word for people, Micha-ko, was suggested by A. L. Kroeber as a possible endonym, keeping with a common practice among tribal groups and the ethnographers studying them in the early 20th century and with the term Miwok itself, which is the Central Sierra Miwok word for 'people'.

Map of Coast Miwok tribelets

== Culture ==
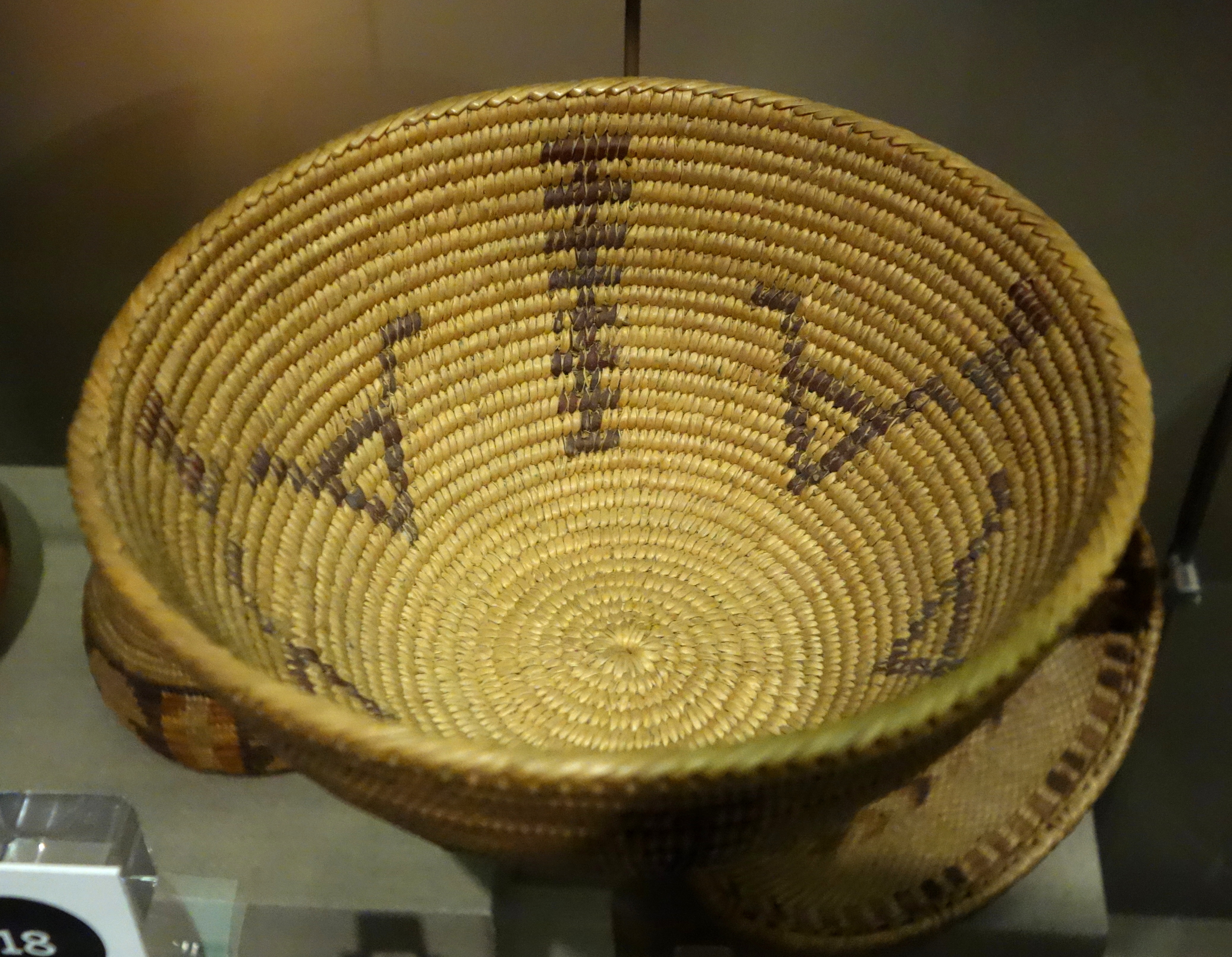
Basket made by Miwok at the Oakland Museum of California

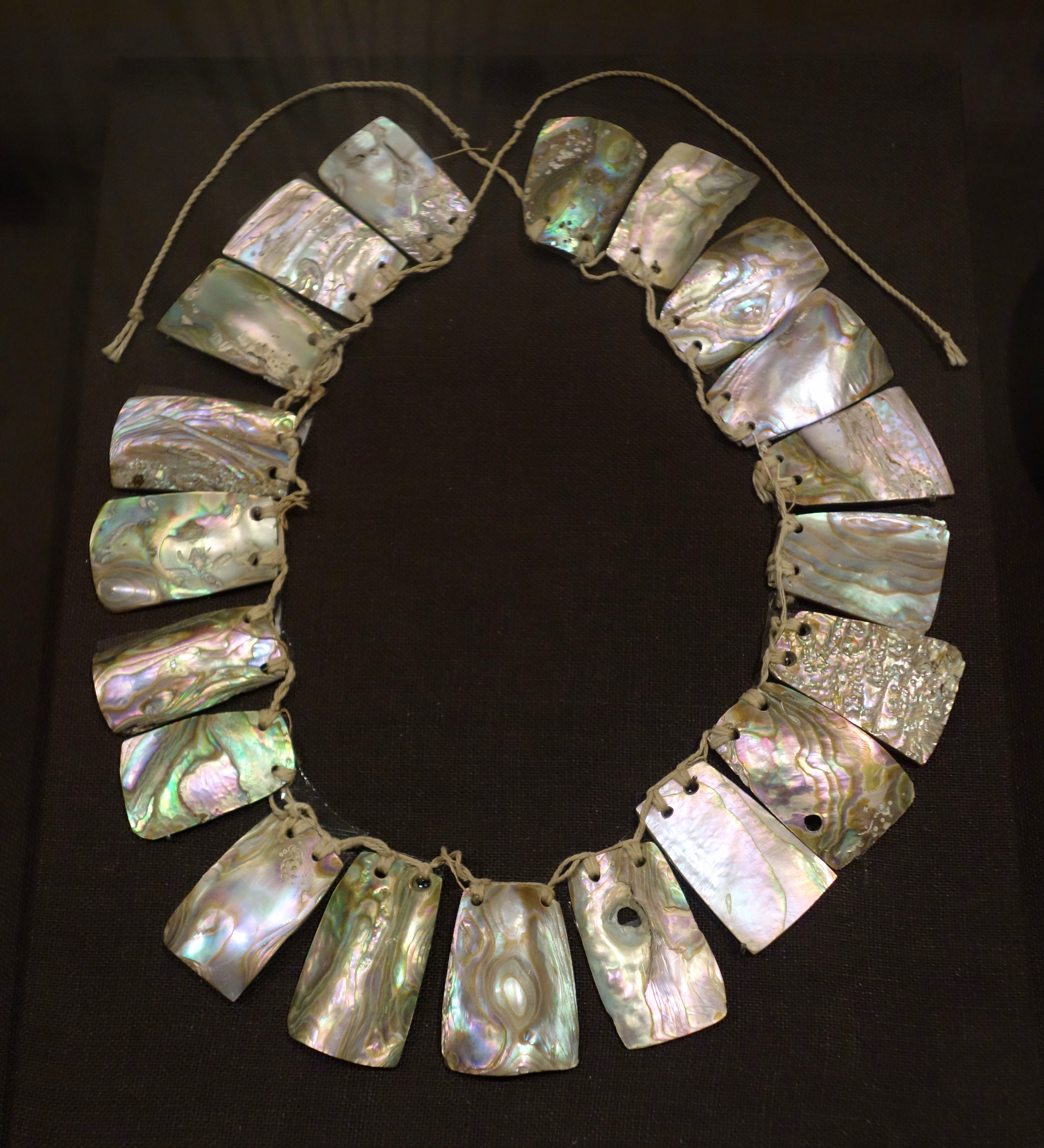
Abalone shells gathered from the coast were used to make jewelry.

The Coast Miwok spoke their own Coast Miwok language in the Utian linguistic group. They lived by hunting and gathering, and lived in small bands without centralized political authority. In the springtime they would head to the coasts to hunt salmon and other seafood, including seaweed. Otherwise their staple foods were primarily acorns—particularly from black and tan oak–nuts and wild game, such as deer and cottontail rabbits and black-tailed deer (Odocoileus hemionus columbianus), a coastal subspecies of the California mule deer (Odocoileus hemionus). When hunting deer, Miwok hunters traditionally used Brewer's angelica (Angelica breweri) to eliminate their own scent. Miwok did not typically hunt bears. Yerba buena tea leaves were used medicinally.

Tattooing was a traditional practice among Coast Miwok, and they burned poison oak for a pigment. Their traditional houses, called "kotcha", were constructed with slabs of tule grass or redwood bark in a cone-shaped form.

Miwok people are skilled at basketry. A recreated Coast Miwok village called Kule Loklo is located at the Point Reyes National Seashore.

=== Cultural subdivisions ===
In C. Hart Merriam's discussions with Coast Miwok peoples, he identified three cultural tribes:

- Olamentko, pronounced O-la-MENT-ko (around Bodega Bay) and now called Olamentke
- Lekahtewutko, pronounced Lek-KAH-te-WUT-ko (in south-central Sonoma County) and now called Lekatuit
- Hookooeko, pronounced HOO-koo-EE-ko (in Marin County and southern Sonoma County), and now called Huukuiko, whom the Olamentko called Olumko, or "South People."

These tribes did not have a political structure and so are not "tribes" in that sense. Rather, chiefs or headmen (oi-bu in Olamentko and hoipu in Hookooeko) were empowered at the tribelet level. The Coast Miwok did not have a single name for all three tribes, describing themselves instead by tribe, tribelet, or village, depending on the context. Using Merriam's divisions, the tribelets as shown on the map to the right—itself derived from Milliken—can be classified as:

- Olamentko
  - Bodega Bay
- Lekahtewutko
  - Bloomfield
- Hookooeko
  - Alaguali
  - Chocuyen
  - Gualen
  - Huimen
  - Olema
  - Olompali
  - Omomi
  - Petaluma (though Merriam puts the southernmost boundary of the Lekahtewutko a mile north of Petaluma and its associated villages, which is in the middle of Milliken's boundaries for this tribelet.)
  - Tamal Aguasto (though the Tamal people lived in the Miller Creek watershed to the north in what is now Terra Linda and the Aguasto to the south, there was enough intermarriage in the early 19th century that Milliken, the source of this article's map, lumps them into a single tribelet.)
  - North Tomales Bay
  - South Tomales Bay

=== Language ===
The Coast Miwok language is still spoken, but the Bodega dialect, spoken by the Olamentko group, is documented in Callaghan (1970). From speaking with Coast Miwok people in the early 1900s, Merriam believed that the Lekahtewutko and Hookooeko dialects were substantially the same.

=== Ethnobotany ===
The Coast Miwok had extensive knowledge and relationships with local flora. Notable engagement with plants may be viewed from four perspectives: medicinal uses, food sustenance, technology and spiritual significance.

Medicinal uses:

The California Floristic province provides an abundant natural pharmacy for healing and known developed treatments for maladies include but are not limited to: analgesic (pain relief), hematology (blood purifier), snakebite, respiratory, gastrointestinal and dermatological (skin) applications.

- Yarrow Achillea sp.(respiratory), Dogwood Cornus sericea (pain relief) and Willow Salix spp. (pain relief), California Coffeeberry Frangula californica (gastrointestinal), Death Camas Toxciscordion fremontii (dermatological), Blue Elderberry Sambucus cerulea (respiratory, dermatology, gastrointestinal and hematology), California Bay Umbellularia californica, (gastrointestinal), Yerba Buena Clinopodium douglasii (hematology), Pacific Madrone Arbutus menziesii (dermatology, gastrointestinal), Yerba Santa Eridictyon californicum (respiratory, dermatological, hematology)

==== Food ====
Comparable to the modern concepts of farming and restoration, Coast Miwok practiced their own methods. Coast Miwok were active stewards to encourage and sustain ecological life-giving sources, otherwise known as resources. For example cultivation efforts involved seed collection, storing seeds, propagation, and transplantation. Other methods include prescribed burns and generational management of oak tree groves or stands.

- Acorns and Nuts:
  - Fagaceae or Beech family used acorns: Golden Chinquapin Chrysolepis chrysophylla, Black Oak Q. kelloggii, Coast Live Oak Q. agrifolia, Valley Oak Q. lobata. Tan Oak Lithocarpus densiflorus Hazel Nut Corylus cornuta. California Bay Umbellularia californica.
- Seeds:
  - Primrose family Onagraceae: Clarkia spp. Sunflower family Asteraceae: Tidy Tips Layia spp., Mule’s ear Wyethia spp.,Tarweeds Madia spp. Hezmizonia spp.,Checkerbloom Sidalcea malviflora
- Berries: Thimbleberry Rubus parviflorus, Currants and Gooseberry Ribes spp., Blackberry Rubus ursinus, Wild Strawberry Fragaria vesca., Huckleberry Vaccinium ovatum, Bilberry Vaccinium cespitosum, Salmon Berry Rubus spectabilis
- Bulbs and shoots: Tule shoots Schoenoplectus sp., Allium spp. Wild onion, Lily Fritillaria spp. Mariposa lily Calochortus spp. Ithuriel's spear Triteleia laxa,
- Greens: Clover, Miner’s lettuce Claytonia spp.

Technology

Building shelter, assisting travel and tools were specialized by the flora available. Coast Miwok utilized various species for their intrinsic properties, fire and rot resistance, fiber strength, flexibility and color ect.

- Shelter: Sequoia sempervirens, Redwood tree bark used as building materials for constructing shelter. Ferns for cross-thatching.
- Travel: Sedges Schoenoplectus acutus and S. californicus were used to make Tule Reed canoes
- Tools:
  - Bow making for hunting or strong wood needs: Incense cedar Calocedrus decurrens, Pacific Yew Taxus brevifolia
  - Plant fibers: Milkweed Asclepias spp., California Hemp Hoita macrostachya, Ground Iris Iris macrosiphon, Dogbane Apocynum spp., Ninebark Physocarpus capitatus
  - Basket weaving: Sedges Carex spp. Cyperus spp. Eleocharis spp., Willows Salix spp., Ferns Adiantum spp. Maidenhair and Five Finger, used for contrasting black stems.
  - Fishing technique stunning with poison, California Buckeye Aesculus californica

Spiritual significance

Plants were deeply valued and an integral part of spiritual or ceremonial practices. Specific plants were used for certain purposes: success for hunting, rites of passage, aiding fertility, protection and health, as well as mourning.

- California Lilac Ceanothus spp. (stimulant)
- Sacred Datura Datura wrightii sp. (hallucinogen) ritual uses age rite of passage
- Cudweed or Ladies’ Tobacco Pseudognaphalium californicum, Rabbit tobacco spp. (stimulant)
- Holy Herb California Yerba Santa Eriodictyon californicum (smudging)
- California Mugwort Artemisia douglasiana (headache relief and mourning)
- Coastal Sagebrush Artemisia californica (rite of passage and protection)

=== Religion ===
Coast Miwok people's world view included animism, and one form this took was the Kuksu religion that was evident in Central and Northern California. This included elaborate acting and dancing ceremonies in traditional costume, an annual mourning ceremony, puberty rites of passage, shamanic intervention with the spirit world and an all-male society that met in subterranean dance rooms. Kuksu was shared with other indigenous ethnic groups of Central California, such as their neighbors the Pomo, also Maidu, Ohlone, Esselen, and northernmost Yokuts. However Kroeber observed less "specialized cosmogony" in the Miwok, which he termed one of the "southern Kuksu-dancing groups", in comparison to the Maidu and other northern California tribes.

Coast Miwok mythology and narratives were similar to those of other natives of Central and Northern California. The Coast Miwok believed in animal and human spirits, and saw the animal spirits as their ancestors. Coyote was seen as their ancestor and creator god. In their stories, the Earth began with land formed out of the Pacific Ocean.

=== Traditional narratives ===
In their myths, legends, tales, and histories, the Coast Miwok participated in the general cultural pattern of Central California.

== Villages ==
The authenticated Coast Miwok villages are:

- On Bodega Bay: Helapattai, Hime-takala, Ho-takala, Suwutenne, Tiwut-huya, Tokau. Also in this vicinity: Awachi (at the mouth of Estero Americano Creek), Amayelle (on San Antonio Creek), Kennekono (at Bodega Corners).
- On Tomales Bay: Echa-kolum, Shotommo-wi (near the mouth of San Antonio Creek), Sakloki (opposite Tomales Point, Dillon Beach area), Utumia (Near present-day town of Tomales.)
- At the present-day City of Petaluma: Etem, Petaluma (east of River). Also in this vicinity: Tuchayelin (northwest), Likatiut (on Petaluma River north of town), Meleya (on San Antonio Creek southwest of Petaluma), Susuli (northwest), Tulme (northwest), Wotoki (on the south side of the Petaluma River).
- At the present-day City of San Rafael: Awani-wi.
- At the present-day City of Sonoma: Huchi. Also in this vicinity: Temblek (west), Tuli (northwest), Wugilwa (on Sonoma Creek).
- At the present-day City of Cotati: Kotati, Lumen-takala (northeast). Also in this vicinity: Payinecha (west).
- At the present-day town of Nicasio: Echa-tamal.
- At the present-day town of Olema: Olema-loke.
- At the present-day City of Sausalito: Liwanelowa.
- Near the present-day town of Bolinas: Bauli-n
- Near the present-day town of Freestone: Oye-yomi, Pakahuwe, Patawa-yomi.
- Near the present-day town of Ignacio: Ewu, Puyuku (south), Shotokmo-cha (southeast).
- Near the present-day City of Novato: Chokeche, Olompolli (northwest).
- Near the present-day town of Valley Ford: Ewapalt, Uli-yomi (at the headwaters of Estero Americano Creek).
- Near the present-day town of Salmon Creek: Pulya-lakum (on the ocean, near the mouth of Salmon Creek).

== History ==
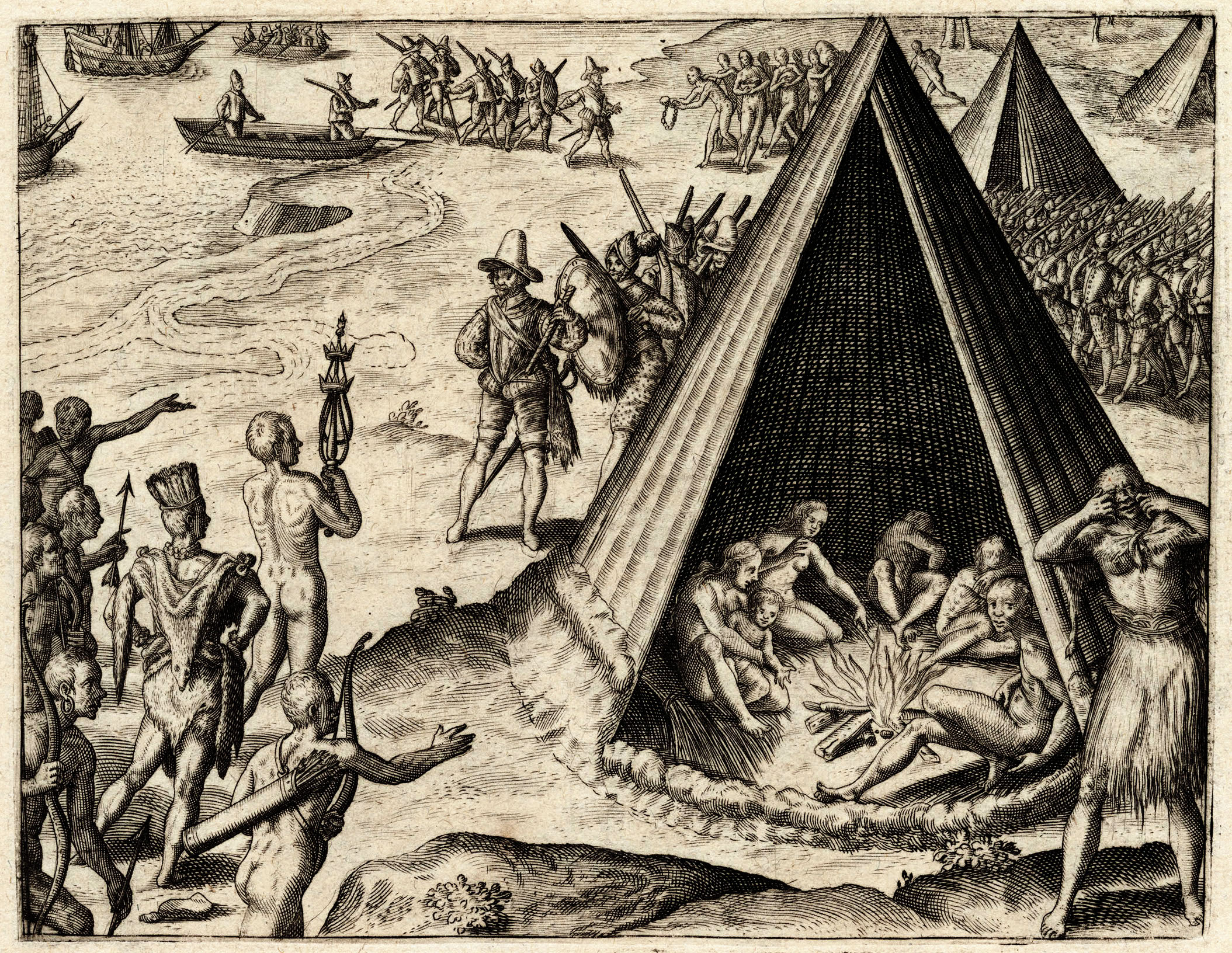
Illustration from a 1590 book: Francis Drake's 1579 expedition reportedly had friendly relations with Californian natives.

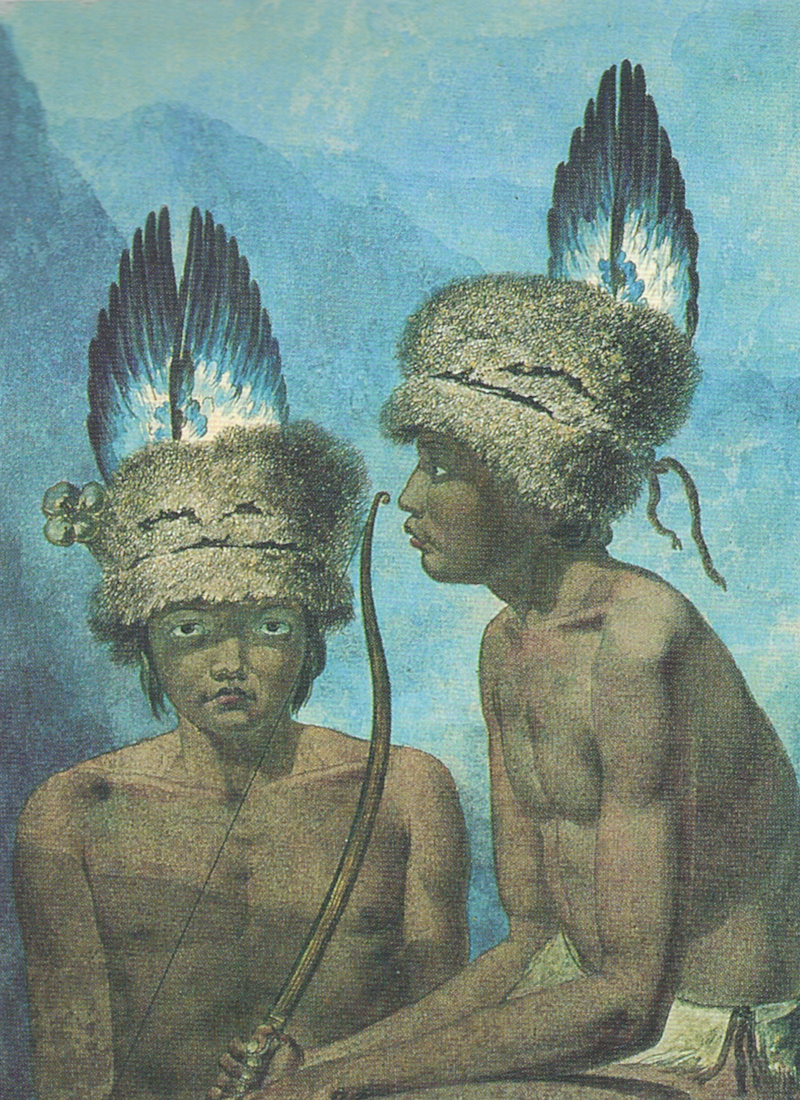
Balthazar, Inhabitant of Northern California, painted by Mikhail Tikhanov 1818

Coastal populations like the Coast Miwok were likely some of the First People to establish on the North American continent. Evidence to suggest this migration path and timeline is supported by the theory of the Kelp Highway and discovery of footprints in White Sands New Mexico date of arrival as far back as 23–21,000 years ago. Before and after the glacial maximum the sea level and coast line drastically changed and archeological sites are likely underwater as the sea level has risen over 400 ft (120 m) since 18,000 years ago and the coast line reduced by over 30 miles (48 km) in some areas.

Documentation of Miwok peoples dates back as early as 1579 by a priest on a ship under the command of Sir Francis Drake. Other verification of occupancy exists from Spanish and Russian voyagers between 1595 and 1808. Over 1,000 prehistoric charmstones and numerous arrowheads have been unearthed at Tolay Lake in Southern Sonoma County—some dating back 4,000 years. The lake was thought to be a sacred site and ceremonial gathering and healing place for the Miwok and others in the region.

Coast Miwok would travel and camp on the coast and bays at peak fishing seasons.

After the Europeans arrived in California, the population declined from diseases introduced by the Europeans. Beginning in 1783, mission ecclesiastical records show that Coast Miwok individuals began to join Mission San Francisco de Asis, now known as Mission Dolores. They started joining that mission in large numbers in 1803, when the marriages of 49 couples from their Huimen and Guaulen local tribes (San Rafael and Bolinas Bay) appeared in the Mission San Francisco Book of Marriages. Local tribes from farther and farther north along the shore of San Pablo Bay moved to Mission San Francisco through 1812. Then in 1814 the Spanish authorities began to split the northern groups—Alagualis, Chocoimes (alias Sonomas), Olompalis, and Petalumas—sending a portion of each group to Mission San Francisco and another portion to Mission San Jose in the southeast portion of the San Francisco Bay Area. By the end of 1817, 850 Coast Miwok had been converted.

Mission San Rafael was founded by the Spanish Franciscans in Coast Miwok territory in the late fall of 1817. By that time the only Coast Miwok people still on their land were those on the Pacific Coast of the Marin Peninsula, from Point Reyes north to Bodega Bay. The Spanish authorities brought most of the Coast Miwoks who had been at Missions San Francisco and San Jose back north to form a founding population for Mission San Rafael. But some who had married Ohlone or Bay Miwok-speaking Mission Indians remained south of the Golden Gate. Over time in the 1820s Mission San Rafael became a mission for Coast Miwok and Pomo speakers. Mission San Francisco Solano, founded in 1823 in the Sonoma Valley (the easternmost traditional Coast Miwok region), came to be predominately a mission for Indians that spoke the Wappo or Patwin languages.

At the end of the Mission period (1769–1834) the Coast Miwoks were freed from the control of the Franciscan missionaries. At the same time the Mission lands were secularized and ceded to Californios. Most Coast Miwok began to live in servitude on the ranchos for the new California land grant owners, such as those who went to work for General Mariano G. Vallejo at Rancho Petaluma Adobe. The ranch owners were dependent upon the labor pool of Indians with agricultural and ranching skills. Other Miwok chose to live independently in bands like those at Rancho Olompali and Rancho Nicasio.

In 1837, a smallpox epidemic decimated all the native populations of the Sonoma region, and the Coast Miwok population continued to decline rapidly from other diseases brought in from the Spaniards as well as the Russians at Fort Ross.

By the beginning of California statehood (1850), many Miwok of Marin and Sonoma Counties were making the best of a difficult situation by earning their livelihoods through farm labor or fishing within their traditional homelands. Others chose to work as seasonal or year-round laborers on the ranches that were rapidly passing from Mexican ownership into Anglo-American ownership.

=== Olompali and Nicasio ===
After Mission San Rafael closed during the 1834–1836 period, the Mexican government deeded most of the land to Californios, but allowed the Miwok ex-neophytes to own land at two locations within traditional Coast Miwok territory: Olompali and Nicasio.

The Coast Miwok leader Camilo Ynitia, secured a land grant of 2 sq. leagues known as Rancho Olompali, from Governor Micheltorena of Alta California in 1843, which included the prehistoric Miwok village of Olompali (his home village) and is north of present-day Novato.

The village of Olompali dates back to 500, had been a main center in 1200, and might have been the largest Miwok village in Marin County. Ynitia held onto the Rancho Olompoli land title for nine years, but in 1852 he sold most of the land to James Black of Marin. He retained 1,480 acres (6.0 km^{2}) called Apalacocha. His daughter eventually sold Apalacocha.

The other Miwok-owned rancho was at Rancho Nicasio northwest of San Rafael. Near the time of secularization (1835), the Church granted the "San Rafael Christian Indians" 20 leagues (80,000 acres or 32,000 hectares) of Mission lands from present-day Nicasio to the Tomales Bay. About 500 Miwok people relocated to Rancho Nicasio. By 1850 they had one league of land left. This radical reduction of land was a result of illegal confiscation of land by Europeans under protest by native residents. In 1870, José Calistro, the last community leader at Nicasio, purchased the small surrounding parcel. Calistro died in 1875, and in 1876 the land was transferred by his will to his four children. In 1880 there were 36 Miwok people at Nicasio. The population was persuaded to leave in the 1880s when Marin County curtailed funds to all Miwok (except those at Marshall) who were not living at the Poor Farm, a place for indigent peoples.

Some Coast Miwok persons were enslaved. In 1846, Joseph Warren Revere (career militant and grandson of Paul Revere) purchased Rancho San Geronimo. It was 8,701 acres (3,521 ha) of Coast Miwok land, first seized by Manuel Micheltorena in 1844 during the Mexican-American war. Revere forced enslaved Coast Miwok people to operate the plantation, selling timber and crops.

By the early 20th century, a few Miwok families pursued fishing for their livelihoods; one family continued commercial fishing into the 1970s, while another family maintained an oyster harvesting business. When this activity was neither in season nor profitable, Miwok people of this area sought agricultural employment, which required an itinerant lifestyle. The preferred locality for such work was within Marin and Sonoma counties.

=== Recognition ===
The Federated Indians of Graton Rancheria, formerly the Federated Coast Miwok, gained federal recognition of their tribal status in December 2000. The new tribe consists of people of both Coast Miwok and Southern Pomo descent.

== Population ==
Estimates for the pre-contact populations of most native groups in California have varied substantially. (See Population of Native California.) Alfred L. Kroeber put the 1770 population of the Coast Miwok at 1,500. Sherburne F. Cook raised this figure to 2,000.

The population in 1848 was estimated as 300, and it had dropped to 60 in 1880.

== Notable people ==
- José Calistro was the last community leader at Nicasio.
- Chief Marin was a Coast Miwok of the Huimen local tribe, baptized at around age 20 in 1801 at Mission San Francisco and noted as an alcalde at Mission San Rafael in the 1820s. He died on March 15, 1839. Marin County and the Marin Islands are named in his honor. He was the "great chief of the tribe Licatiut", according to General Vallejo's semi-historical report to the first California State Legislature (1850). He was likely, then, of the Lekahtewutko from southern Sonoma County.
- Quintin, was renowned as the sub-chief of Marin and skipper at Mission Dolores, according to General Vallejo. San Quentin Peninsula (1840) is reputed to be named after him. San Quentin State Prison was added much later.
- Julia F. Parker, notable basket weaver.
- Ponponio (aka Pomponio) was baptized in 1803 at around age four at Mission San Francisco. He was a leader of a band of Native American fugitives in California who called themselves Los Insurgentes. Evading authorities, he was eventually captured in Marin County, and executed in Monterey in 1824.
- Greg Sarris is the current Tribal Chairman of the Federated Indians of Graton Rancheria, also a college professor and author.
- William Smith was born a Bodega Bay Coast Miwok (Olamentko), was forced relocation to Lake County during the late 19th century, but returned to Bodega Bay where he and his relatives founded the commercial fishing industry in the area.
- Tsupu, a Coast Miwok elder
- Camilo Ynitia (1816–1856) was a Coast Miwok leader who became the owner of an 8,800 acres (36 km^{2}) land grant secured for the Miwok, named Rancho Olompali, now the Olompali State Historic Park. Ynitia also forged a ranch labor-alliance with General Vallejo, and secured semblance of peace with the white settlers (about 1830s–1840s).

== See also ==
- Marin Museum of the American Indian, situated on the site of a former Coast Miwok settlement in Novato
- Fully feathered basket
