= Kule Loklo =

Recreated village in California, United States

Coordinates: 38.0457°N 122.80408°W

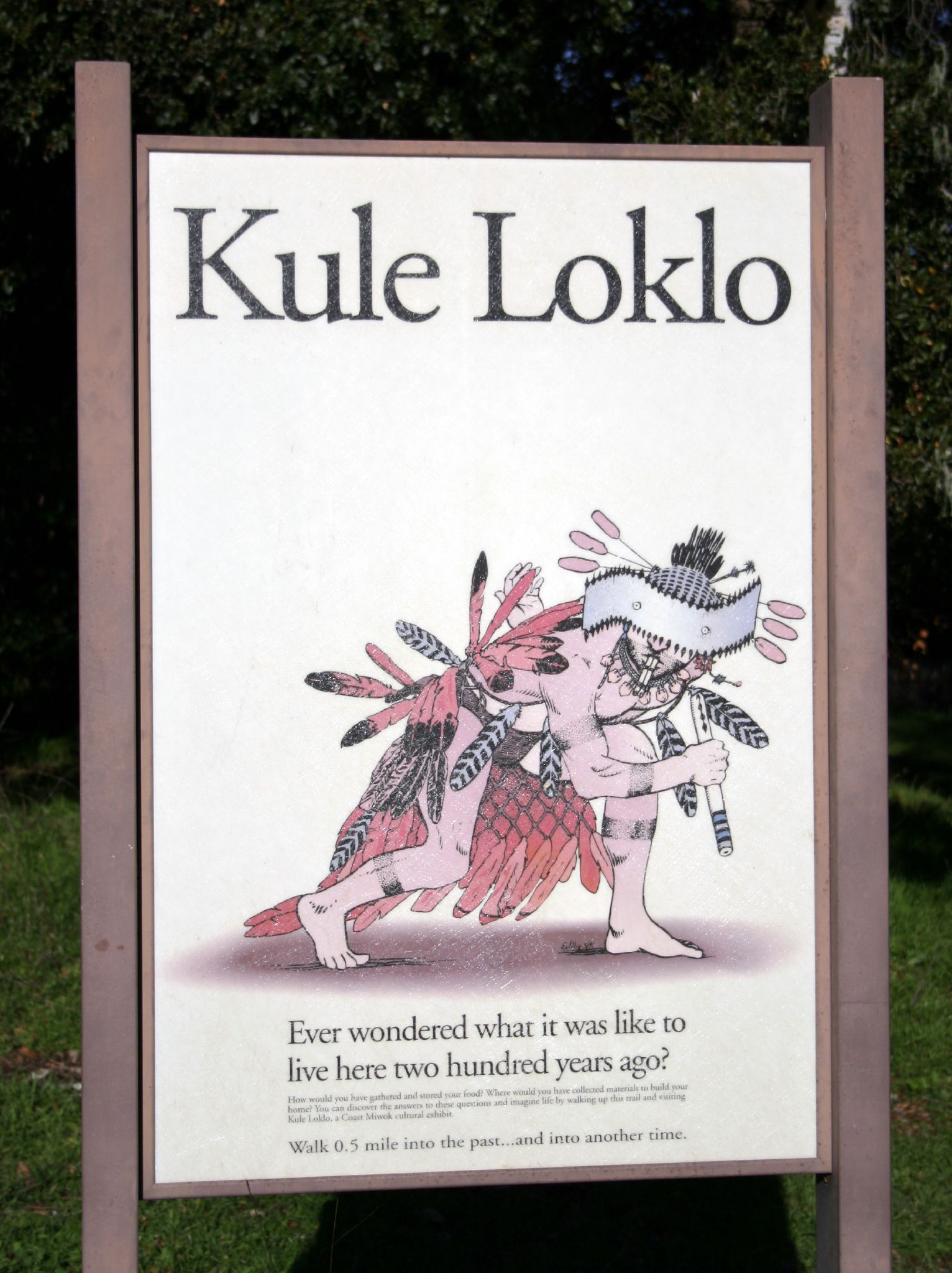
Entrance sign to the site

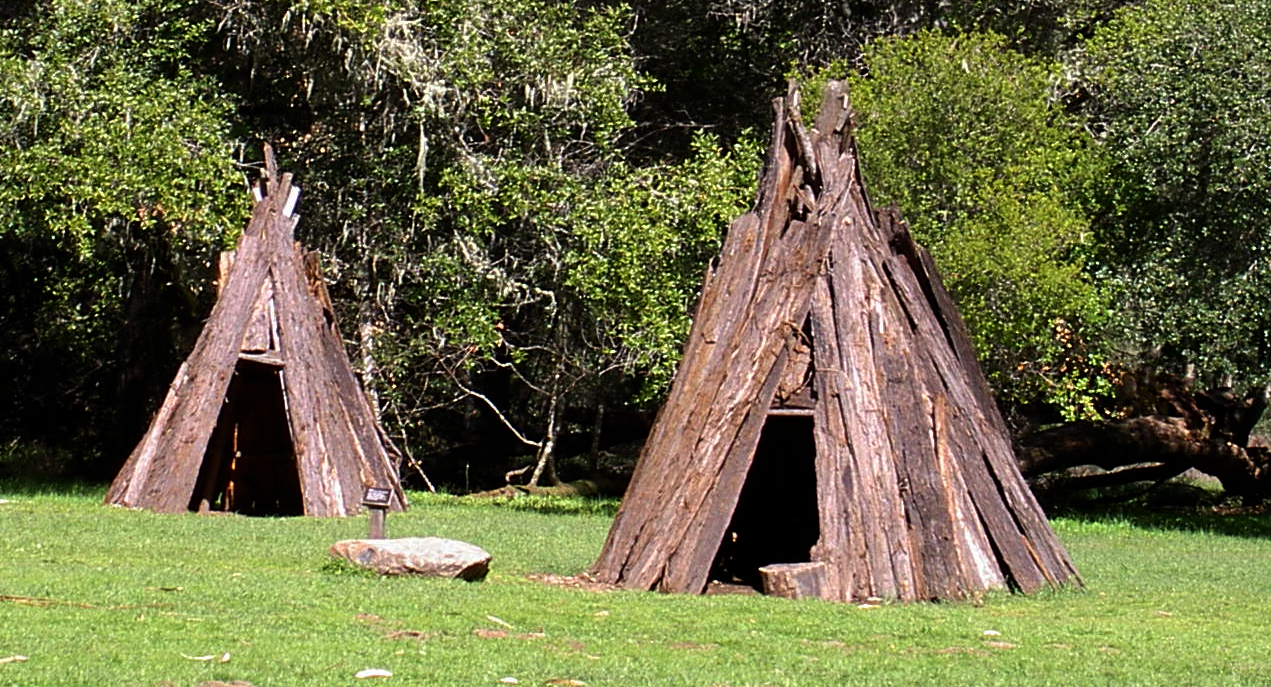
Part of Kule Loklo in 2009

Kule Loklo ("Bear Valley") is a recreated Coast Miwok Native American village located a short walk from the visitor center of the Point Reyes National Seashore, in Marin County, California. Kule Loklo was originally created in the 1970s by the Miwok Archeological Preserve of Marin (MAPOM) as a tribute to Marin County's indigenous people, the Coast Miwoks.

In 1992, the ceremonial roundhouse at Kule Loklo was destroyed by an arsonist; through an outpouring of community support, it was replaced with a larger roundhouse in 1993. As of 2022, the roundhouse is in disrepair.

There is currently one annual public festival at Kule Loklo, the Big Time, held in late July, which features California Indian dancing and Native American crafts.
