= Rancho Nicasio =

Mexican land grant in California

Coordinates: 38.080°N 122.700°W

Rancho Nicasio was a Mexican land grant of 56,807 acres (230 km^{2}) granted to the Coast Miwok indigenous people in 1835, located in the present-day Marin County, California, a tract of land that stretched from San Geronimo to Tomales Bay. Today, Nicasio, California is at the heart of this location.

== History ==
In the mid-1830s, lands were promised by General Mariano Vallejo to the San Rafael Indians, whose land had been co-opted by the Mission San Rafael. When asked what land they wanted, the Coast Miwok chiefs chose 80,000 acres (324 km^{2}) ranging from Nicasio Valley to the area surrounding Tomales. The land was granted by Mexican Governor José Figueroa to the Coast Miwok of Marin County in 1835, but the Miwok claim was rejected by the Public Land Commission in 1855.

In 1844, Governor Manuel Micheltorena granted the 56,621-acre (229.14 km^{2}) Rancho Nicasio to Pablo de la Guerra and John B.R. Cooper. By 1849, there were three owners — Pablo de la Guerra, Cooper, and Jasper O’Farrell. In 1850 Pablo de la Guerra sold his 30,848 acres (124.8 km^{2}) undivided share of the ranch to Henry Wager Halleck. Halleck had arrived in California in 1847 as a lieutenant in the United States Engineers, accompanied by his friend, Lt. William Tecumseh Sherman. Halleck was a partner in the San Francisco law firm Halleck, Peachy & Billings, and in the Civil War was promoted by President Abraham Lincoln to general-in-chief of the armies of the United States. Halleck hunted and fished at Rancho Nicasio, and built a house on the creek near Nicasio, now called Halleck Creek. In 1850, Cooper sold his 16,293 acres (65.9 km^{2}) undivided share of the ranch to Benjamin Rush Buckelew. Besides Cooper’s share of Rancho Nicasio, Buckelew also purchased Cooper’s Rancho Punta de Quentin and John Reed’s Rancho Corte Madera del Presidio. In 1851, O’Farrell sold his 9,479 acres (38.4 km^{2}) share to James Black, the grantee of Rancho Cañada de Jonive. In 1852 Buckelew sold 7,598 acres (30.7 km^{2}) to William Reynolds and Daniel Frink.

With the cession of California to the United States following the Mexican-American War, the 1848 Treaty of Guadalupe Hidalgo provided that the land grants would be honored. As required by the Land Act of 1851, a claim for Rancho Nicasio was filed with the Public Land Commission in 1852, and the grant patented to Black, Buckelew, Halleck, and Reynolds and Frink in 1870. A separate claim was filed by Juan Bautista Alvarado in 1853, but was rejected due to lack of evidence.

Black later bought Halleck’s share of Rancho Nicasio. Black also bought Rancho Olompali from Camilo Ynitia, the last Olompali Indian chief, in 1852. Black's daughter, Mary, married Dr. Galen Burdell. Black's wife, Maria Agustina Sais, died in Dr. Burdell's dental chair in 1864. In 1866 Black married Maria Loreto Duarte, Ygnacio Pacheco’s widow. James Black died in 1870. The Black/Burdell family sold parts of the property, but owned part until 1975.

Buckalew sold much of his remaining portion of the rancho to William J. Miller, a member of the Murphy family. Murphy sold his ranch in portions in the 1860s. Some of these parts are now included in the Olema Valley and Bolinas Ridge district of the Golden Gate National Recreation Area.

== See also ==
- Ranchos of California
- List of Ranchos of California
