= Coast Miwok language =

Extinct Miwok language of California, US

Coast Miwok
- Native to: United States
- Region: California
- Ethnicity: Coast Miwok
- Extinct: 1978, with the death of Sarah Ballard; 1 (1994)
- Language family: Yok-Utian: Utian; Miwokan; Western; Coast Miwok

Language codes
- ISO 639-3: csi
- Glottolog: coas1301
- ELP: Coast Miwok

Coast Miwok was one of the Miwok languages spoken in California, from San Francisco Bay to Bodega Bay. The Marin and Bodega varieties may have been separate languages. All of the population has shifted to English.

== Phonology ==
The following is the Bodega dialect:

Consonants
		Labial	Dental	Alveolar	Post- alveolar	Palatal	Velar	Glottal
Nasal		m		n				
Stop	plain	p	t̪ ⟨t⟩		t̠ ⟨ṭ⟩		k	ʔ ⟨'⟩
Stop	voiced	(b)		(d)			(ɡ)	
Affricate					tʃ ⟨c⟩			
Fricative		(f)		s	ʃ ⟨ṣ⟩			h
Tap				(ɾ) ⟨r⟩				
Approximant		w		l		j ⟨y⟩		

Phonemes in parentheses are introduced from Spanish loan words. Allophones of the introduced sounds /b ɡ/ include /β ɣ/.

Vowels
	Front	Central	Back
Close	i		u
Mid	e		o
Open		a	

== Morphology ==
According to Catherine A. Callaghan's Bodega Miwok Dictionary, nouns have the following cases, expressed with suffixes: present subjective, possessive, allative, locative, ablative, instrumental, and comitative.

== Syntax ==
Sentences are most commonly subject-verb-object, but Callaghan says that "syntax is relatively free".
