= Tomales High School =

Coordinates: 38°14′51″N 122°53′43″W

Location
- 3850 Irvin Road; Tomales, California 94971; United States

Information
- Type: Public comprehensive high school
- Motto: Roll Braves
- Established: 1912
- School district: Shoreline Unified School District
- Principal: John McGurke
- Teaching staff: 15.81 (FTE)
- Grades: 9-12
- Enrollment: 132 (2023–2024)
- Student to teacher ratio: 8.35
- Colors: Red; Black; White
- Athletics: North Coast Section
- Mascot: Brave
- Nickname: Home of the Braves
- Accreditation: Western Association of Schools and Colleges
- Yearbook: The Tide
- Website: Official website

Tomales High School is located in the town of Tomales, California, United States. It is the comprehensive high school of the Shoreline Unified School District. It serves the western Marin and Sonoma County communities, stretching from the towns of Point Reyes Station and Inverness along Tomales Bay, running north past the fishing port of Bodega Bay to the mouth of the Russian River, a distance of nearly 50 miles (80 km), and widening 13 miles (21 km) east from the west coast. Tomales High School draws its students from approximately 450 square miles (1,200 km^{2}). Tomales High School was recognized as a California Distinguished School in 2011.

== History ==
Tomales Union High School opened on Aug. 5, 1912, with 23 students and one teacher/principal located on a hill in downtown Tomales. The school grew quickly: before the two-classroom school was a decade old, it was expanded to 10 classrooms thanks to a $30,000 school bond. The California Field Act mandates that all the state’s public schools be earthquake safe, and Shoreline School District trustees in the 1960s were faced with either retrofitting the old school or building a new one. Bond elections to finance various options followed and were twice narrowly defeated. In 1967 a third election was successful. Affirmative votes in all precincts except Inverness resulted in an overall 73 percent approval for the $1.1 million bond to finance a new high school. In 1969, the new high school opened along Tomales-Petaluma Road. Much of the school was extensively remodeled in 2011.

Tomales High teams were originally called the Wolves, but in 1950, the name was changed to the Braves. In 2001, Shoreline School District trustees decided the name was disrespectful to Native Americans and voted to change it. Many district residents objected, including several Miwok descendants who said the name had been changed to the Braves to honor them. The trustees voted to keep the name as the Braves but to drop the Indian image.

== About Tomales High School ==
Tomales High serves the greater Tomales Bay and Bodega Bay communities in Marin County and Sonoma County as the comprehensive high school of the Shoreline Unified School District. The school serves an area famous for its oyster, ranching, and fishing industries.

Tomales High is fed by Tomales Elementary School and West Marin Elementary School. Tomales Elementary serves the northwest Marin communities of Tomales, Dillon Beach, Fallon, and Marshall as well as the Sonoma County communities of Valley Ford, Bloomfield and parts of rural western Petaluma. Students from the Sonoma Coast towns of Bodega and Bodega Bay attend Bodega Bay Elementary and feed into Tomales for middle and high school. West Marin Elementary School serves the southern end of the Shoreline Unified School District including the West Marin communities of Point Reyes Station, Inverness, and Olema.

=== Demographics ===
Student enrollment has declined steadily from 295 in 1998-99 (including adjoining Shoreline High School) to an all-time low of 169 in 2008-09. Since then enrollment has remained steady between 170 and 190 students.

Tomales High demographics:

1998-1999	Percent
White	75%
Hispanic or Latino	22%
Black or African American	2%
Asian/Pacific Islander/other	1%
Total	283 students

2012-13	Percent
White	48%
Hispanic or Latino	47%
Black or African American	2.5%
Asian/Pacific Islander/other	2.5%
Total	185 students

2020-2021	Percent
Hispanic or Latino	67.5%
White	27.7%
Asian/Pacific Islander/other	2.4%
Two or More	2.4%
Total	166 students

== Athletics ==
The Tomales Braves are a member of the North Coast Section. The Braves compete in the Coastal Mountain Conference and are a member of the North Central League II.

=== Football ===
The Braves have a strong tradition reaching the North Coast Section playoffs from 1991-2004 and 2006-2012. The Braves have won five NCS titles (1983, 1995, 1998, 2001, 2002) and have been section runner-up five times (1992, 2004, 2006, 2010, 2011). The Braves won six straight NCL II league titles (2006-2011) and went 36-0-1 in that stretch. Head Coach Leon Feliciano was named the 2011 North Coast Section Honor Coach. Since 1996 he has led the Braves to a 137-69-4 record. Feliciano retired after the 2014 season.

=== Basketball ===
Howard Wilson has served as the boys' head coach since 2011-12. He retired after the 2014-2015 season, after leading the Braves to back to back North Coast Section Playoff appearances.

Chris Kenyon led the Lady Braves to a 2011 NCS Division VI title. He retired after the 2014 campaign.

=== Baseball ===
Bill Tucker was at the helm from 1995-2015, winning a North Coast Section Championship in 2013. The Braves were NCS Runners-up in 2007, 2009, and 2015.

=== Other sports ===
- Football
- Cheerleading
- Basketball
- Volleyball
- Tennis
- Soccer
- Softball
- Baseball
