= Peggy Smith =

Peggy Smith is the co-founder of Cowgirl Creamery along with Sue Conley.

Both women are credited with their role in developing Northern California's artisan cheese industry. In 2006, with Conley, she won a James Beard award in recognition for "significant and lasting achievements and contributions to the food and beverage industry for ten or more years."

== Early life ==
Smith attended the University of Tennessee, where she met Conley. In 1976, the two women moved to San Francisco, where both took jobs in the restaurant industry. Smith worked at Noe Valley Bar and Grill in San Francisco and Mount View Grill in Calistoga before she was hired to cook at the new upstairs cafe at Chez Panisse. She worked at Chez Panisse for 17 years. After leaving Chez Panisse, Smith moved to Point Reyes, California, where she and Conley founded Tomales Bay Foods with the intent of marketing and distributing foods made in the West Marin area.

== Work ==
Smith co-founded Cowgirl Creamery, a manufacturer and distributor of artisan cheese, along with Conley.

They founded the cheese-making company as a way of creating a product which showcased the organic milk produced by Albert Straus at Straus Family Creamery: "We saw the need to showcase great quality organic milk. The farm economy could not survive the state it was in, so we saw a need to preserve land in agriculture."

Smith is a member of the California Artisan Cheese Guild. With Conley, she wrote Cowgirl Creamery Cooks.

In 2016, Smith and Conley sold Cowgirl Creamery to Emmi, a Swiss dairy firm.

== Bibliography ==
- Smith, P.; Conley, S.; Hamilton, H. (2013). Cowgirl Creamery Cooks. Chronicle Books LLC. ISBN 978-1-4521-2632-6.
