= Shoreline Unified School District =

School district in California, United States

Location
- Tomales, California Marin County and Sonoma County United States

District information
- Type: Public
- Grades: K-12
- Superintendent: Adam Jennings
- Accreditation(s): WASC
- Schools: 5

Students and staff
- Enrollment: 470 (as of 2022–23)
- Faculty: 36.7 FTEs
- Student–teacher ratio: 12.8:1
- Athletic conference: North Coast Section

The Shoreline Unified School District serves the West Marin and Sonoma County communities stretching from the towns of Point Reyes Station and Inverness along Tomales Bay running north past the fishing port of Bodega Bay to the mouth of the Russian River, a distance of nearly 50 miles (80 km) and widens 13 miles (21 km) east from the west coast. Shoreline Unified draws its students from an area of approximately 450 square miles (1,200 km^{2}).

As of the 2022–23 school year, the district, comprising five schools, had an enrollment of 470 students and 36.7 classroom teachers (on an FTE basis), for a student–teacher ratio of 12.8:1.

In Marin County, the district includes the census-designated places of Dillon Beach, Inverness, Point Reyes Station, and Tomales. In Sonoma County, the district includes the CDPs of Bloomfield, Carmet, Salmon Creek, Sereno del Mar, and Valley Ford, as well as the majority of Bodega Bay.

== Schools ==
- Bodega Bay School
- Inverness Primary
- Tomales Elementary School
- Tomales High School
- West Marin School

== Communities served ==
Marin County

- Point Reyes Station
- Inverness
- Olema
- Marshall
- Tomales
- Dillon Beach

Sonoma County

- Valley Ford
- Bloomfield
- Bodega
- Bodega Bay
- Western Petaluma
