= List of American cheeses =

US-made cheeses sorted by type

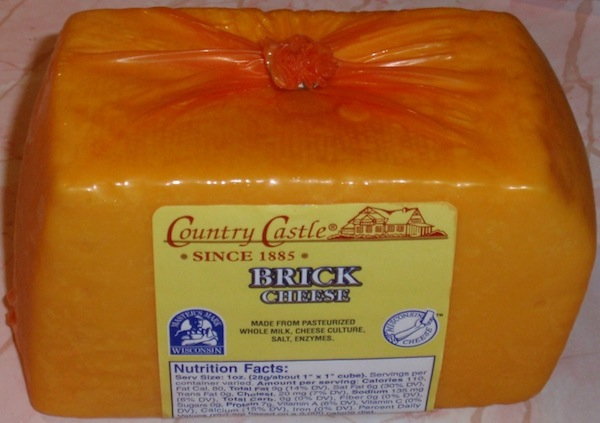
A package of brick cheese

This is a list of cheeses typical of the United States. The list excludes specific brand names, unless a brand name is also a distinct variety of cheese. While the term "American cheese" is legally used to refer to a variety of processed cheese, many styles of cheese originating in Europe are also made in the United States, such as brie, cheddar, gouda, mozzarella, and provolone. Also, many local dairies throughout the country produce artisan cheeses and other more localized flavors. Almost half of the cheese produced in the United States comes from Wisconsin and California; they along with New York and Vermont are well-known within the U.S. for their cheese.

== American cream cheeses ==
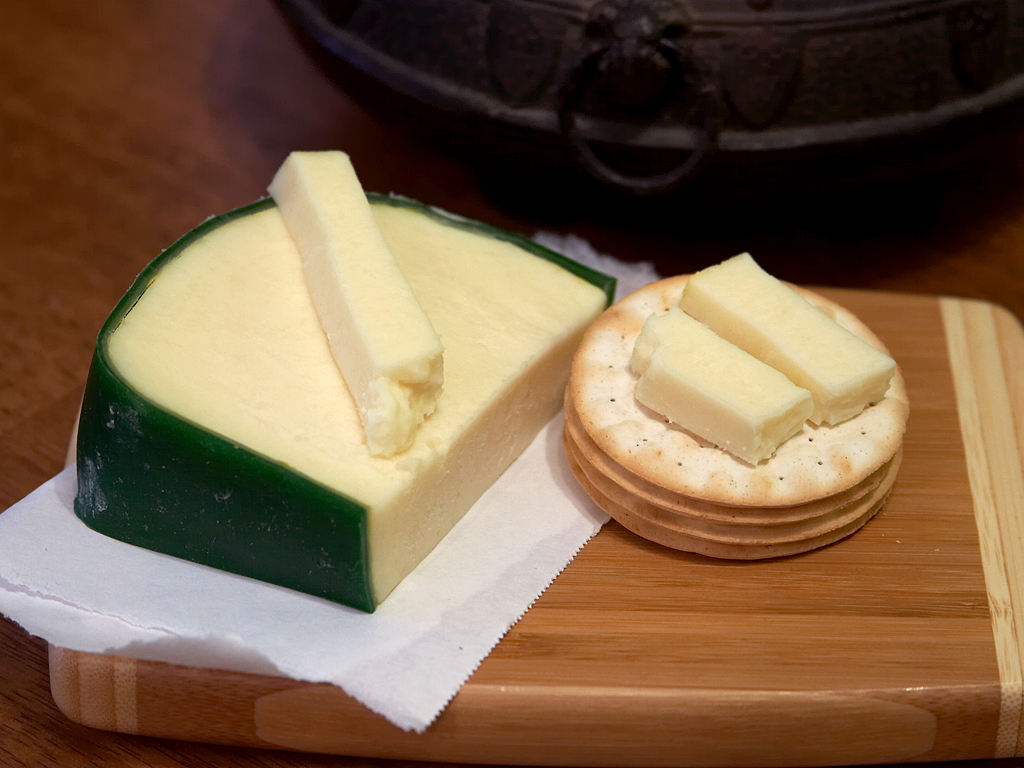
Bergenost cheese

- Bergenost
- Cream cheese
- Creole cream cheese
- Cup cheese
- Red Hawk cheese, triple-crème cow's milk cheese with a brine washed rind, made in California
- Kunik cheese

== American soft cheeses ==
- BellaVitano Cheese
- Brick cheese
- Cheese curd
- Colby cheese
- Colby-Jack cheese
- D'Isigny
- Farmer cheese
  - Hoop cheese, drier version of farmer cheese
- String cheese, particular American variety of mozzarella with a stringy texture
- Cougar Gold, an American cheddar
- Humboldt Fog, made in California
- Liederkranz cheese
- Monterey Jack
  - Pepper jack cheese, variety of Monterey Jack
- Pinconning cheese, aged variety of Colby
- Pizza cheese, specially made for its melting qualities
- Muenster cheese, extremely mild, semi-soft with annatto exterior, nothing like name-controlled washed rind Alsacian Muenster
- Swiss cheese related to the Emmental cheese of Switzerland but slightly different
  - Baby Swiss, mild variety
  - Lacey Swiss, mild, lower-fat variety
  - Smoked Swiss
  - Aged Swiss, the oldest and strongest flavor
- Vermont cheddar

== American hard cheeses ==
- Capricious, goat's milk cheese made in Petaluma, California
- American generic parmesan, developed in the United States but inspired by Parmigiano-Reggiano cheese from Italy

== American blue cheeses ==
- Maytag Blue cheese, brand name which is also a distinct variety of cheese

== Processed cheeses ==
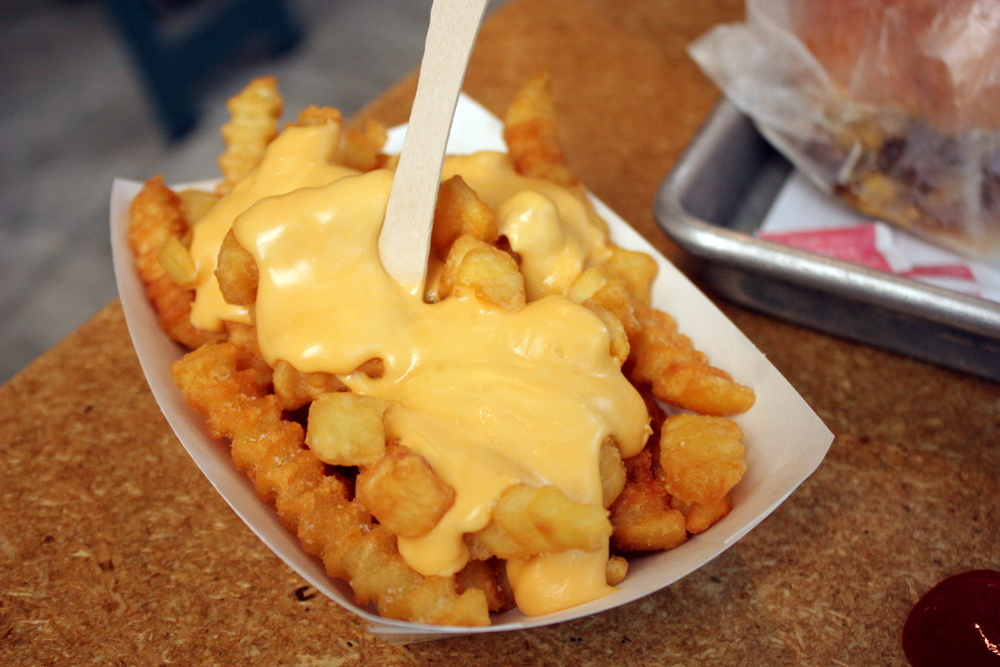
Melted cheese on fries at Shake Shack

- American cheese, a variety of processed cheese usually created from a combination of Colby and cheddar cheeses
- Government cheese, variety of processed cheese food
- Nacho cheese
- Old English, a processed cheese from Kraft, often used in cheese balls, sold in a small glass jar
- Pimento cheese
- Pizza cheese, some varieties are not cheese but processed cheese
- Provel cheese
- Roka Blue, a processed blue cheese often used in cheese balls
- Spray Cheese, a processed aerosol cheese created in the US.
- Velveeta, brand name for a softer style of processed cheese than American cheese

== American Fresh cheeses ==
- Cottage Cheese, made from skimmed milk, soupy texture.

== See also ==
- List of cheeses
- List of cheesemakers
- List of American foods
