= Red Hawk =

Red Hawk may refer to:

- Red Hawk (cheese), a triple-crème cow's milk cheese with a brine washed rind
- Rocky the Red Hawk, the mascot of Montclair State University
- Red Hawk, a Sioux chief ca. 1913
- A casino and town of the Shingle Springs Band of Miwok Indians
- Boeing–Saab T-7 Red Hawk, a single-engine, tandem seat advanced jet trainer of the United States Air Force
- Development code-name for the RAF's Fireflash missile.

== See also ==
- Red-backed Hawk
- Red-shouldered Hawk
- Red-tailed Hawk
- Redhawk (disambiguation)
- Redhawks (disambiguation)
