= Marin Organic =

U.S. non-profit organization

- Founded: 1999
- Type: 501(c)(3) non-profit
- Purpose: Sustainable, organic and local agriculture
- Location: Point Reyes Station, California
- Members: 200 (2009)
- Key people: Peggy Smith, President of the Board of Directors; Helge Hellberg, Executive Director
- Employees: 7 (as of December 2009)
- Volunteers: 600 (2009)
- Website: www.marinorganic.org

Marin Organic is a non-profit 501(c)(3) association of organic producers headquartered in Point Reyes Station, California. Founded in 1999 with the goal of creating the first all-organic county, Marin Organic is known for working with the government, community groups and organizations, fellow ranchers and farmers to advance the practice of sustainable, organic production. The organization is internationally recognized model for building economically viable, community-based local foodsheds.

== Background ==
Marin Organic was founded to advance the interest of the small farmers of Marin County, California. The association of 66 organically certified farmers is known for sustainable agriculture and produces vegetables greens, fruit, cheese and meat. The Marin Organic Certified Agriculture (MOCA) is recognized by the USDA Organic Program (NOP) as one of the ten organic certifiers in the US in 2021 that contributed to the National Organic Standards.

== History ==
In 1990, in response to an announcement that the USDA would undertake a process to regulate a National Organic Program, Marin County organic farmers met to discuss the need for stringent standards and locally responsive food systems. Over the next eight years, as practitioners they developed a unique, place-based set of criteria as hallmarks of sustainable, local food production standards, and they worked with the Marin County Agricultural Commissioner's office to create a county-based, local standards for organic certification.

In 1999, the local farmers and producers founded Marin Organic as a farmer-driven, 501(c)(3) non-profit organization to help preserve farming as a way of life in the county. They created a forum for sharing information and best practices among members and instituted protections for Marin's wildlife and habitat. They advocated for the highest standards—to go beyond the national standards for organic and to include economic prosperity, environmental stewardship and social equity—the three pillars of sustainability.

In 2004, the organization was able to raise enough money through individual donations, foundation and government grants to hire a full-time executive director, development director and membership coordinator. Soon after, the Point Reyes all organic Farmer's Market, and the Organic School Lunch program were launched. The organization's notoriety increased precipitously in November 2005, when the Prince of Wales and the Duchess of Cornwall visited Marin County as guests of Marin Organic.

At the time of Marin Organic's founding, Marin County had a total of 13 certified organic producers and 400 certified organic acres. Since that time, Marin Organic has led and supported educational and farmer outreach efforts directly and indirectly resulting in the certification of nearly sixty operations and conversion of more than 20,000 acres (81 km^{2}) from conventional agricultural production to organic production. Today, the organization's membership includes 37 local, small and mid-scale organic producers. Delegates from all over the world have come to study Marin Organic as a model for sustainable, community-based agriculture.

== Board of directors ==
As of December 2009, the Marin Organic Board of Directors are:

- President: Peggy Smith, President - Cowgirl Creamery
- Vice President: Todd Koons - Epic Roots
- Co-Treasurer: Peter Liu - New Resource Bank
- Co-Treasurer: Kathy Yang - Consultant
- Secretary: Mark Dowie - Journalist
- Marcia Barinaga - Barinaga Ranch
- Jill Giacomini - Point Reyes Farmstead Cheese Company
- Don Gilardi - RedHill Farms
- Kevin Lunny - Drake's Bay Family Farms
- Monica Moore - Independent Consultant
- Mark Stefanski - Marin Academy
- Tom Stubbs - Stubbs Vineyards
- Sara Tashker - Green Gulch Farm

== Programs ==
=== Member Support ===
All members of Marin Organic must either pass third-party certification in the USDA National Organic Program, or at least be registered with the Agricultural Commissioner's office as an organic operation before being considered for membership to the organization. After member applicants have been certified to the national standards, they must then pass a point system unique to Marin Organic that ranks their operations in terms of local connectedness, ethical operation, environmental stewardship, and correction of problems on the farm. This peer-review set of standards surpasses the USDA regulations and ensures that Marin Organic operations are fitted to local conditions and need.

==== Marketing Assistance ====
Marin Organic offers its members the following marketing and PR assistance:

- Sales leads, strategic alliances, use of the Marin Organic logo, a 10% discount on all farm supplies at Toby's Feed Barn in Pt. Reyes Station, and a Marin Organic farm sign
- Promotion of the Marin Organic label on point of purchase signage, stall signs and banners at Farm Markets and local retail outlets
- Spreading the Marin Organic name and its message about the benefits of buying locally grown and produced food through local and national media outlets
- Creating demand for member's products among restaurants, grocery stores and farmers markets
- Networking and business education opportunities by connecting fellow farmers and ranchers through seminars and workshops
- Participation in community-based events to educate the public, such as Taste of Marin, Harvest Day, and many other conferences, events and gatherings

=== Supporting Business Partner Program ===
Marin Organic supports farmers by developing marketing campaigns that promote local, organic agriculture, creating a brand identity through the Marin Organic logo, developing relationships with local stores and restaurants and creating opportunities for businesses to meet local producers. Marin Organic also hosts a range of community events to highlight local producers and encourage media coverage of Marin's agricultural community. Though the Supporting Business Program, businesses make a commitment to buy from local producers whenever possible and in exchange receive a large sign, are highlighted on the organization's website, and receive the producer member marketing benefits.

=== Organic School Lunch and Gleaning Program ===
Once a week Marin Organic visits member farms, gleans produce that would otherwise be left in the field, and delivers the food to public and private schools in Marin County. Gleaned food is produce which would otherwise be left in the fields because it doesn't meet the strict aesthetic requirements of restaurants and retail markets. This can account for up to 20% of what is grown, and throughout the year. Through the Marin Organic School Lunch and Gleaning program more than 100,000 pounds of fresh, local, organic potatoes, squash, kale, spinach, arugula, lettuce, leeks, cucumbers, beets, carrots, zucchini, lemons, yogurt, milk, ice cream, meat and eggs have been added to the lunches of Marin school children. The program serves 12,000 students each week and earns local producers nearly $40,000 annually.

=== Point Reyes Farmers Market ===
One of Marin Organic's first initiatives was to become the fiscal sponsor of the Point Reyes Farmers Market. Located in Point Reyes Station, the Point Reyes Farmers Market is the only market in the greater San Francisco Bay area to feature only locally grown, organic produce. Marin Organic serves as the market's fiscal sponsor and has helped to build the market into one of the most popular community meeting places and market outlets in the region. The market hosted 21 farmers and vendors in 2009 and hosted several speaking and tasting events featuring local authors, chefs and musicians.

=== Salmon Safe Certification ===
In 2007, Marin Organic launched its newest program Salmon Safe – a certification program designed to verify local producers' environmental stewardship of waterways and riparian habitats. The program is the result of a partnership between Marin Organic and Salmon Safe Oregon, in collaboration with the Environmental Action Committee of West Marin.

Twelve properties have been certified in Marin, including Star Route Farms, Blackberry Farm, Green Gulch Farm, Slide Ranch, Drake's Bay Family Farms, Paradise Valley, Fresh Run Farm, La Tercera and Commonweal Gardens. Through the program, Marin Organic offers certification to Marin producers, technical assistance to meet the strict guidelines if needed, and incentives in the form of a recognizable label which designates a product as grown with the health of local waterways and their residents in mind. The program is not just for organic producers, but any producer that uses non-toxic, integrated pest management practices.

Many individuals and groups, such as the Salmon Protection And Watershed Network (SPAWN), have been working for years to protect the rivers and streams of Marin County and restore riparian habitat in an effort to foster the return of the salmon to Marin County. The Salmon Safe program is a means of verifying that Marin agricultural producers are doing their part as well.

"This program demonstrates that collaborative efforts and mutual understanding can result in an improved environment, farming viability, habitat improvements, enhancement of biodiversity, and the protection of threatened and endangered species..." - Marin Agricultural Commissioner Stacy Carlsen.
