= Sue Conley =

Sue Conley may refer to:

- Sue Conley (businesswoman)
- Sue Conley (politician)
