= Dillon Beach, California =

- Unincorporated community Census Designated Place
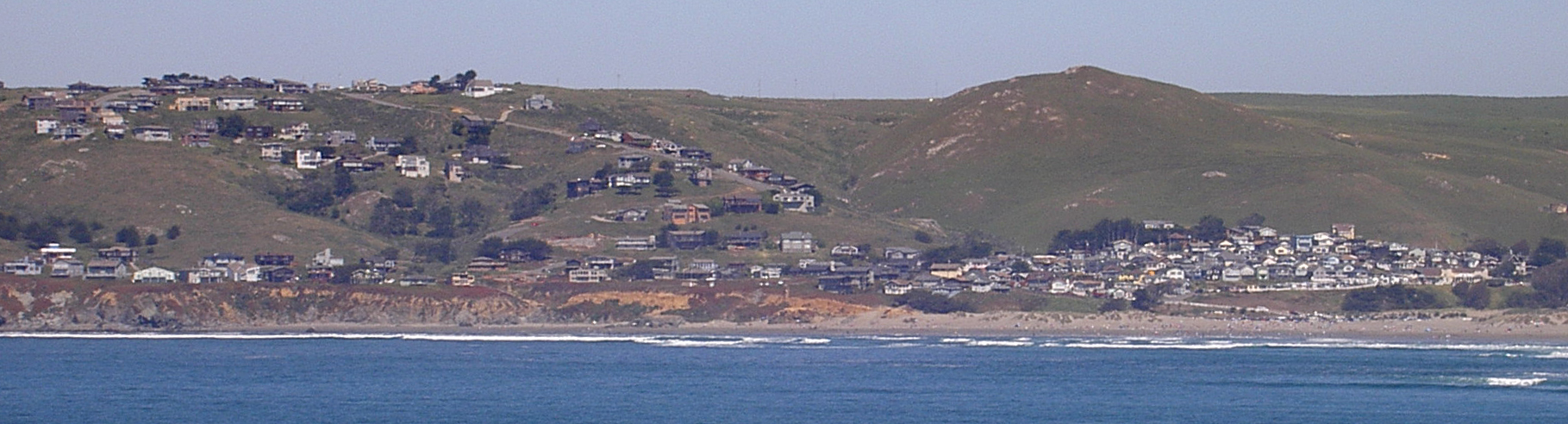
- Dillon Beach as seen from Tomales Point

- Location in Marin County and the state of California

- Location in the United States
- Coordinates: 38°15′03″N 122°57′55″W
- Country: United States
- State: California
- County: Marin

Government
  - County Board: District 4 Dennis Rodoni
  - State Senate: Mike McGuire (D)
  - Assembly: Damon Connolly (D)
  - U. S. Congress: Jared Huffman (D)

Area
  - Total: 2.98 sq mi (7.73 km^{2})
  - Land: 2.98 sq mi (7.73 km^{2})
  - Water: 0 sq mi (0.00 km^{2}) 0%
- Elevation: 89 ft (27 m)

Population (2020)
  - Total: 246
  - Density: 82.44/sq mi (31.83/km^{2})
- Time zone: UTC-8 (PST)
  - Summer (DST): UTC-7 (PDT)
- ZIP code: 94929
- Area code: 707
- FIPS code: 06-19262
- GNIS feature ID: 1658420

Dillon Beach is an unincorporated community in Marin County, California, United States. It is located 3.25 miles (5.2 km) west of Tomales, at an elevation of 89 ft (27 m). For statistical purposes, the United States Census Bureau has defined Dillon Beach as a census-designated place (CDP). The population was 246 at the 2020 census. Dillon Beach was named after the founder, George Dillon, who settled there in 1858.

== Geography ==
Dillon Beach is located at Bodega Bay (near the mouth of Tomales Bay).

The Estero de San Antonio State Marine Recreational Management Area is a marine protected area located 1.5 miles (2.4 km) north of Dillon Beach. Like an underwater park, this marine protected area helps conserve ocean wildlife and marine ecosystems.

According to the United States Census Bureau, the CDP has a total area of 2.98 sq mi (7.7 km^{2}), all land.

== History ==
The Coast Miwok people had a presence in the area around Dillon Beach long before Europeans arrived in the Americas. It is thought that a few of their villages were located within the greater Dillon Beach area, including one around the feature known locally as the Sand Point.

In the 1850s, local historical figure Tom Wood operated in the area, employing the natives in harvesting of grain to be milled nearby. He would attempt to ensure that they were not taken advantage of by the British, French, or American traders who frequented the coast. Hides and tallow were traded for various manufactured goods, among them whiskey. Despite Wood's efforts, many of them succumbed to alcoholism. Today, while a few individuals claim descent from the local Coast Miwoks, no full-blooded members are alive. Tom's Point, immediately south of Dillon Beach on the eastern shore of the bay, is named for Tom Wood, and Wood resided there with the small village he ingratiated himself into.

Irishman George Dillon and wife Mathilda arrived at what is now Dillon Beach from the eastern U.S. in 1868. When his friends and family showed interest in the area, he thought to capitalize on it; in 1888, he built an 11 bedroom hotel, restaurant, and general store. This is the Dillon Beach Resort in operation today. Visitors would explore the area on their way up the coast toward the redwood forests, strolling the beach, fishing, or digging clams from the nearby clam bars of Tomales Bay.

In 1903, Dillon sold out to John Keegan with the agreement that the beach would always be named Dillon Beach. Keegan also built cottages, one of which still stands along the road to the beach. Keegan ran a stagecoach from Dillon Beach to Tomales where it met the train.

Keegan sold the holdings to the California Eucalyptus Plantation Company in 1911. They planted the area with eucalyptus trees, a few of which still stand, but continued to operate the resort, and redoubled these efforts as the eucalyptus crop proved to warp easily and was effectively worthless. Under the subsidiary of the Dillon Beach Company, they operated the resort, ferried guests from the train in Tomales, ran a charter boat, and created Portola Beach, a subdivision along Cliff Street. Try as they might, their Dillon Beach operations were failing.

When regular visitors and Woodland ranchers Sylvester and Carrie Lawson offered to lease the property, the California Eucalyptus Plantation Company promptly agreed. Different portions of the business and land were leased or purchased by the Lawson family, and by 1942 Dillon Beach was firmly in Lawson hands. Sylvester and Carrie's older son, Howard, and his wife, Winifred, owned and ran the resort, while the younger son, Walter, and his wife, Nita, ran the southern side of the property, operating it as a ranch and opening Lawsons Landing on it. The Landing is operated by Walter's descendants to this day as a campground with a store and boating access to Tomales Bay.

During World War II, fears of a Japanese invasion of the West Coast were considered well founded, especially along sparsely populated Marin and Sonoma counties, where enemy forces could conceivably make landfall and prepare for a larger invasion of San Francisco Bay. The military commandeered many cottages and monitored the water from outposts on the surrounding hills supported by ground patrols. The sand dunes on the Lawsons Landing property were also a site for rifle and grenade practice, and the Lawson family recalls at least one instance of an armored vehicle's .50 caliber machine gun being fired around their cows, resulting in a tense conversation between soldiers and ranchers. One soldier reportedly sighted a Japanese submarine off the beach, prompting the garrison to scramble to nearby Marshall to requisition its civilian fishing boats for use in a counterattack, several of which were run by their respective owners. It took several hours to coordinate the operation, and once the soldiers finally arrived at the area of the supposed sighting, armed only with small arms, the submarine had departed, if it had been there at all.

The College of the Pacific operated from 1933 until some time in the 1980s. It stood between Portola Beach and Lawsons Landing, offering a hands-on experience for a small number of marine biology students. The concrete foundation is all that remains today, hinting at what was there before to passersby today.

During the 1960s, Oceana Marin was developed north of town by John Keegan's grandson, James Keegan of Wells Fargo Bank and Henry Trione of Sonoma County Mortgage. Modern coastal houses were built on the hillsides overlooking the town.

The resort, day use beach, and restaurant were sold to Fred Cline in 1990 by the Lawsons. He would sell in 2018 to the group of investors owning it today.

== Dillon Beach Resort ==
Between 2001 and 2018, Dillon Beach Resort was owned and operated by Fred and Nancy Cline of Sonoma Valley, California. In April 2018, Mike Goebel purchased the resort. It is the only private beach in California.

== Demographics ==
Historical population
Census	Pop.	Note	%±
2000	319		—
2010	283		−11.3%
2020	246		−13.1%
U.S. Decennial Census; 1860–1870 1880-1890; 1900 1910 1920; 1930 1940 1950; 1960 1970 1980; 1990 2000 2010; 2020

Dillon Beach first appeared as a census designated place in the 2000 U.S. census.

=== Racial and ethnic composition ===
Dillon Beach CDP, California – Racial and ethnic composition Note: the US Census treats Hispanic/Latino as an ethnic category. This table excludes Latinos from the racial categories and assigns them to a separate category. Hispanics/Latinos may be of any race.
Race / Ethnicity (NH = Non-Hispanic)	Pop 2000	Pop 2010	Pop 2020	% 2000	% 2010	% 2020
White alone (NH)	297	257	210	93.10%	90.81%	85.37%
Black or African American alone (NH)	1	0	1	0.31%	0.00%	0.41%
Native American or Alaska Native alone (NH)	1	3	0	0.31%	1.06%	0.00%
Asian alone (NH)	9	4	6	2.82%	1.41%	2.44%
Native Hawaiian or Pacific Islander alone (NH)	0	0	0	0.00%	0.00%	0.00%
Other race alone (NH)	1	0	1	0.31%	0.00%	0.41%
Mixed race or Multiracial (NH)	7	10	11	2.19%	3.53%	4.47%
Hispanic or Latino (any race)	3	9	17	0.94%	3.18%	6.91%
Total	319	283	246	100.00%	100.00%	100.00%

=== 2020 census ===
The 2020 United States census reported that Dillon Beach had a population of 246. The population density was 82.4 inhabitants per square mile (31.8/km^{2}). The racial makeup of Dillon Beach was 214 (87.0%) White, 1 (0.4%) African American, 1 (0.4%) Native American, 6 (2.4%) Asian, 0 (0.0%) Pacific Islander, 3 (1.2%) from other races, and 21 (8.5%) from two or more races. Hispanic or Latino of any race were 17 persons (6.9%).

The whole population lived in households. There were 114 households, out of which 23 (20.2%) had children under the age of 18 living in them, 64 (56.1%) were married-couple households, 7 (6.1%) were cohabiting couple households, 27 (23.7%) had a female householder with no partner present, and 16 (14.0%) had a male householder with no partner present. 30 households (26.3%) were one person, and 17 (14.9%) were one person aged 65 or older. The average household size was 2.16. There were 78 families (68.4% of all households).

The age distribution was 29 people (11.8%) under the age of 18, 11 people (4.5%) aged 18 to 24, 40 people (16.3%) aged 25 to 44, 88 people (35.8%) aged 45 to 64, and 78 people (31.7%) who were 65 years of age or older. The median age was 57.5 years. For every 100 females, there were 103.3 males.

There were 409 housing units at an average density of 137.1 units per square mile (52.9 units/km^{2}), of which 114 (27.9%) were occupied. Of these, 87 (76.3%) were owner-occupied, and 27 (23.7%) were occupied by renters.

=== 2010 census ===
At the 2010 census, Dillon Beach had a population of 283. The population density was 94.8 inhabitants per square mile (36.6/km^{2}). The racial makeup of Dillon Beach was 266 (94.0%) White, 3 (1.1%) Native American, 4 (1.4%) Asian, and 10 (3.5%) from two or more races. Hispanic or Latino of any race were 9 people (3.2%).

The census reported that 100% of the population lived in households.

There were 147 households, 20 (13.6%) had children under the age of 18 living in them, 79 (53.7%) were opposite-sex married couples living together, 6 (4.1%) had a female householder with no husband present, 2 (1.4%) had a male householder with no wife present. There were 6 (4.1%) unmarried opposite-sex partnerships, and 3 (2.0%) same-sex married couples or partnerships. 48 households (32.7%) were one person and 26 (17.7%) had someone living alone who was 65 or older. The average household size was 1.93. There were 87 families (59.2% of households); the average family size was 2.37.

The age distribution was 28 people (9.9%) under the age of 18, 7 people (2.5%) aged 18 to 24, 44 people (15.5%) aged 25 to 44, 127 people (44.9%) aged 45 to 64, and 77 people (27.2%) who were 65 or older. The median age was 57.4 years. For every 100 females, there were 95.2 males. For every 100 females age 18 and over, there were 94.7 males.

There were 440 housing units at an average density of 147.5 per square mile, of the occupied units 125 (85.0%) were owner-occupied and 22 (15.0%) were rented. The homeowner vacancy rate was 5.3%; the rental vacancy rate was 59.3%. 84.5% of the population lived in owner-occupied housing units and 15.5% lived in rental housing units.

== Education ==
Dillon Beach is served by the Shoreline Unified School District.
