= Redhawks =

Redhawks or RedHawks may refer to:

- Cardiff Redhawks, a university ice hockey club
- Fargo-Moorhead RedHawks, an independent minor league baseball team
- Frontier Redhawks, a high school athletic program
- Malmö Redhawks, a Swedish ice hockey team
- Martin Methodist Redhawks, the collegiate athletic program of Martin Methodist College
- Miami RedHawks, the collegiate athletic program of Miami University in Ohio
- Oklahoma City RedHawks, a minor league baseball team now known as the Oklahoma City Dodgers
- Seattle Redhawks, the collegiate athletic program of Seattle University
- Montclair State University Red Hawks, the collegiate athletic program of Montclair State University
- Southeast Missouri State University
- Milton High School (Milton, Wisconsin) Redhawks, the high school athletic program of Milton High School in Wisconsin.
- Washington Redhawks, a media parody/satire intended to call attention to the Washington Redskins name controversy
- "Washington Redhawks", a team in the video game Blitz: The League
- Western Canada Redhawks, the athletic program of Western Canada High School

== See also ==
- Red Hawk (disambiguation)
- Redhawk (disambiguation)
