= Capricious (cheese) =

Brand of American goat cheese

- Country of origin: United States
- Region: San Francisco Bay Area
- Town: Petaluma, California
- Source of milk: Goat's milk
- Texture: hard

Capricious is an aged goat's milk cheese made by the Achadinha Cheese Company in Petaluma, California. It won "Best in Show" at the 2002 American Cheese Society awards.

== See also ==
- List of American cheeses
- List of goat milk cheeses
