= Sue Conley (businesswoman) =

Co-founder of Cowgirl Creamery

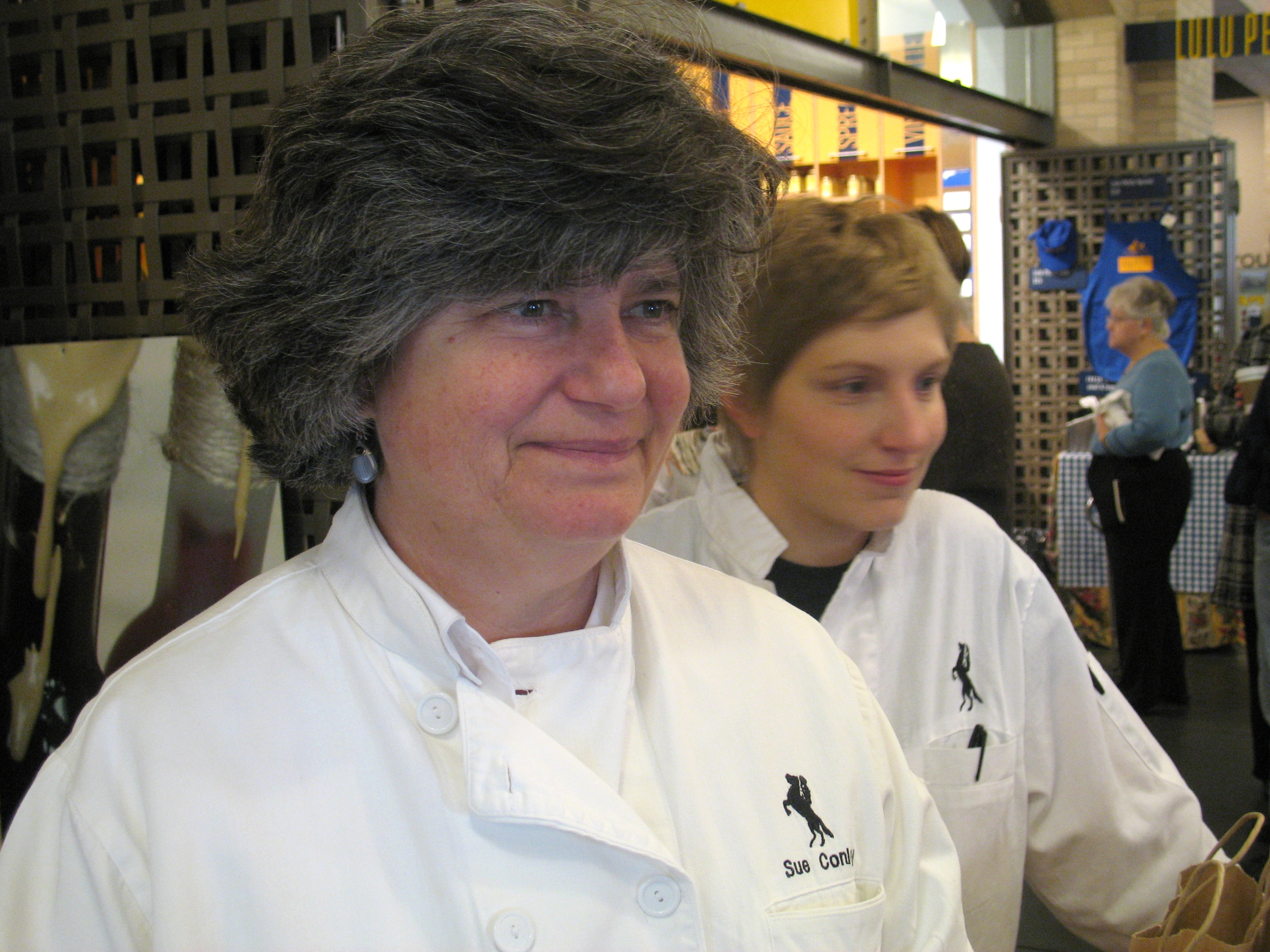
Sue Conley of Cowgirl Creamery

Sue Conley is the co-founder of Cowgirl Creamery along with Peggy Smith.

Both women are credited with their roles as catalysts of Northern California's artisan cheese industry. In 2006, along with Smith, she won a James Beard award for "significant and lasting achievements and contributions to the food and beverage industry for ten or more years."

== Early life ==
Conley was born in Washington, D.C., where her grandfather managed the cafeteria Sholl's Colonial. She attended the University of Tennessee, where she met Smith.

== Work ==
After moving to the San Francisco Bay Area in 1976, Conley worked in restaurants before co-founding Bette's Oceanview Diner. After selling her shares in Bette's Oceanview Diner, she co-founded Tomales Bay Foods, a distributor and marketer of West Marin-produced foods, and Cowgirl Creamery, a manufacturer and distributor of artisan cheese, along with Smith. Conley has credited her travels to Europe as well as Peggy Smith's work at Chez Panisse as amplifying their interest in regional, artisan food production.

According to Conley, they founded the cheese-making company as a way of creating a product which showcased the organic milk produced by Albert Straus at Straus Family Creamery: "We saw the need to showcase great quality organic milk. The farm economy could not survive the state it was in, so we saw a need to preserve land in agriculture."

Conley is a member of the California Artisan Cheese Guild. With Smith, she wrote Cowgirl Creamery Cooks.

In 2016, Conley and Smith sold Cowgirl Creamery to Emmi, a Swiss dairy firm.

== Bibliography ==
- Smith, P.; Conley, S.; Hamilton, H. (2013). Cowgirl Creamery Cooks. Chronicle Books LLC. ISBN 978-1-4521-2632-6.
