= Red Hawk cheese =

Type of American triple-crème aged cow's-milk cheese with a brine-washed rind

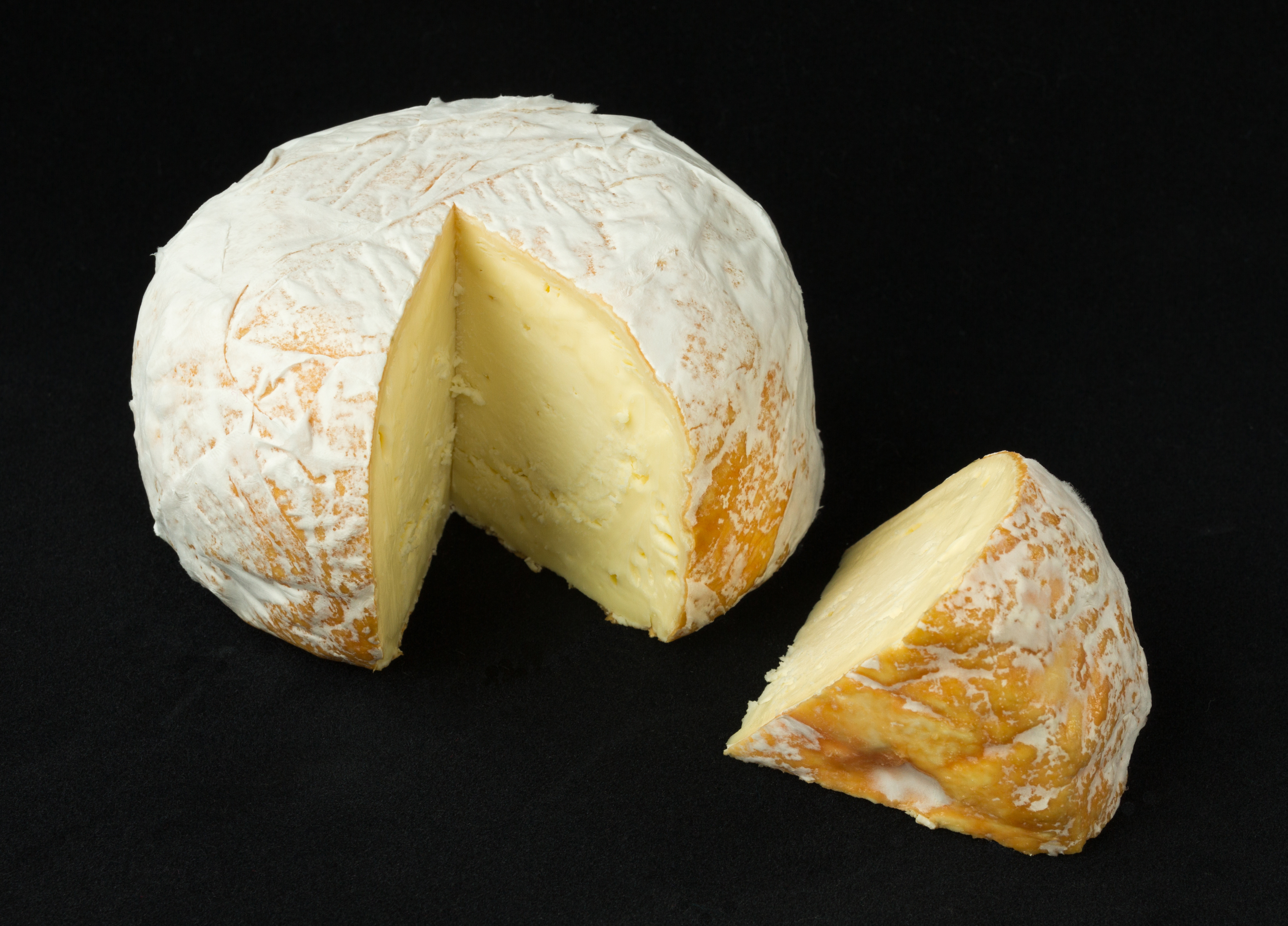
- Country of origin: United States
- Source of milk: cow's milk
- Named after: Red-tailed Hawk

Red Hawk is a type of American triple-crème aged cow's-milk cheese with a brine-washed rind produced by the Cowgirl Creamery in Point Reyes Station, California. The brine wash encourages the development of the red-orange rind and the cheese was named after red-tailed hawks that are frequently seen around the city of Point Reyes Station.

== See also ==
- List of American cheeses
- List of cheeses
