= Redhawk =

Redhawk may refer to:

- Ruger Redhawk, a large frame revolver
- Ruger Super Redhawk, a line of double action magnum revolvers
- RedHawk Linux, a real-time operating system used by Concurrent Computer Corporation in the early 2000s

== See also ==
- Red Hawk (disambiguation)
- Redhawks (disambiguation)
