= Bergenost =

Type of cheese

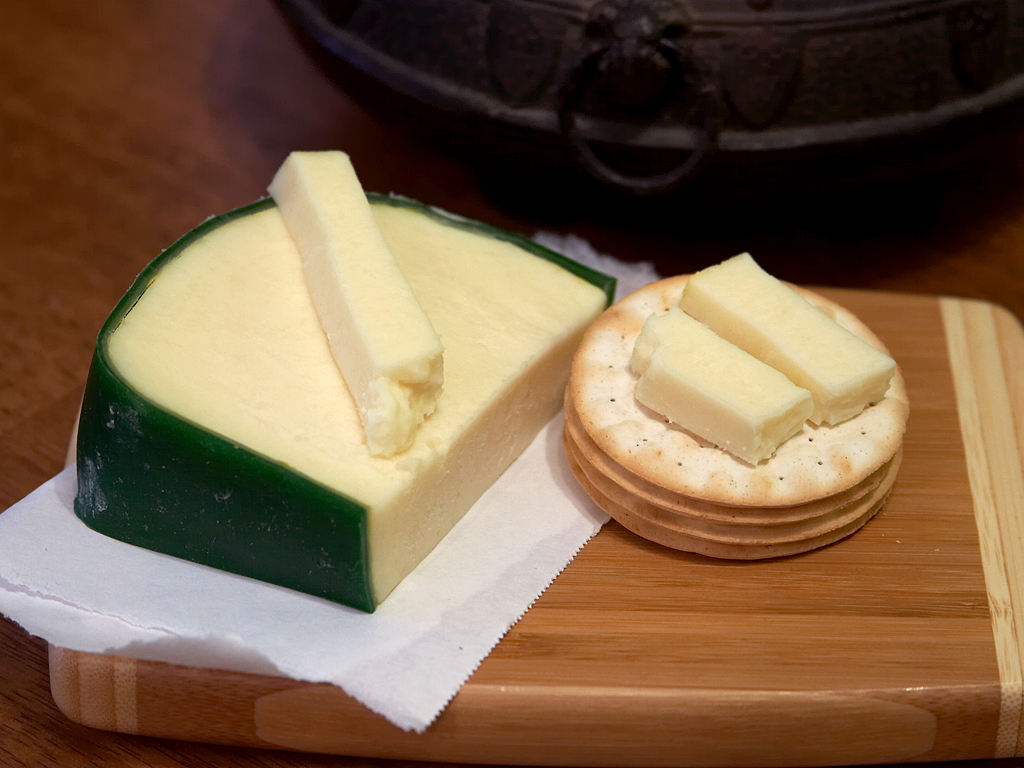
Bergenost cheese

Bergenost is a triple-cream, Norwegian-style butter cheese made by Yancey's Fancy of Corfu, New York using imported Norwegian cultures. This cheese won the company a gold medal in the 1999 New York State Fair Cheese Contest. It is sold in wedges with a distinctive green wax casing.

Bergenost is a semi-soft cheese with a mild, smooth flavour and a subtle hint of sourness. The flavour of the cheese makes it a great complement to the tart sweetness of lingonberry, another Norwegian favourite.
