= Tomales Bay =

Inlet of the Pacific Ocean in Marin County, California, US

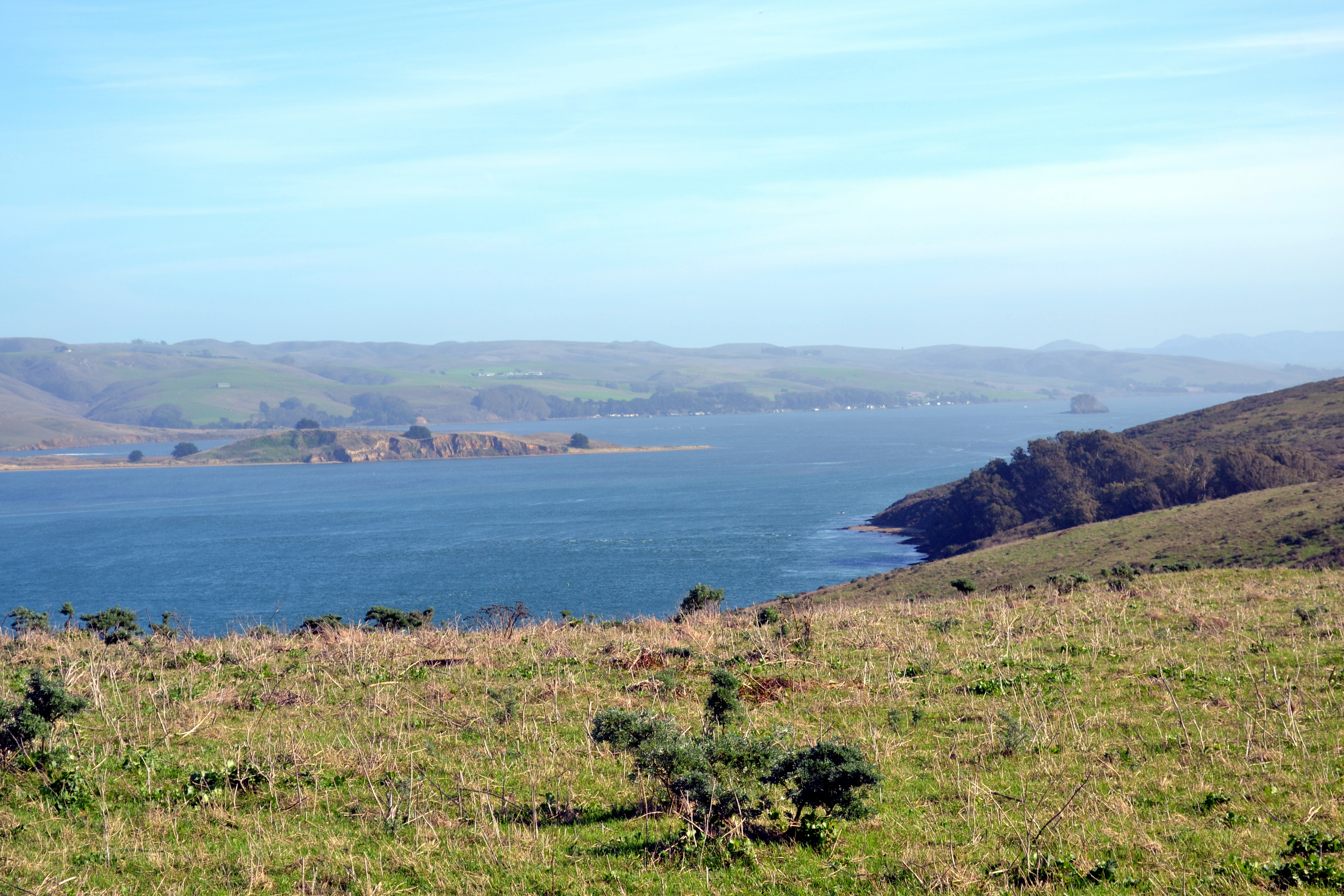
- Tomales Bay as viewed from Tomales Point Trail

- Location within California
- Coordinates: 38.14860°N 122.89787°W
- Type: Bay
- Ocean/sea sources: Pacific Ocean
- Basin countries: United States
- Max. length: 15 km (9.3 mi)
- Max. width: 1.6 km (0.99 mi)
- Settlements: Inverness; Inverness Park; Point Reyes Station; Marshall

Ramsar Wetland
- Official name: Tomales Bay
- Designated: October 21, 2002
- Reference no.: 1215

Tomales Bay (Coast Miwok: Tamal Liwa) is a long, narrow inlet of the Pacific Ocean in Marin County in northern California in the United States.

== Geography ==
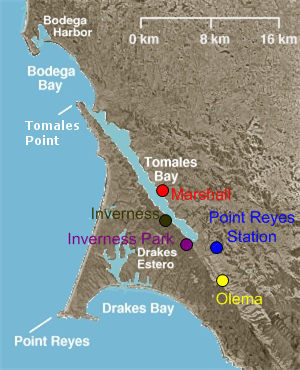
West Marin towns

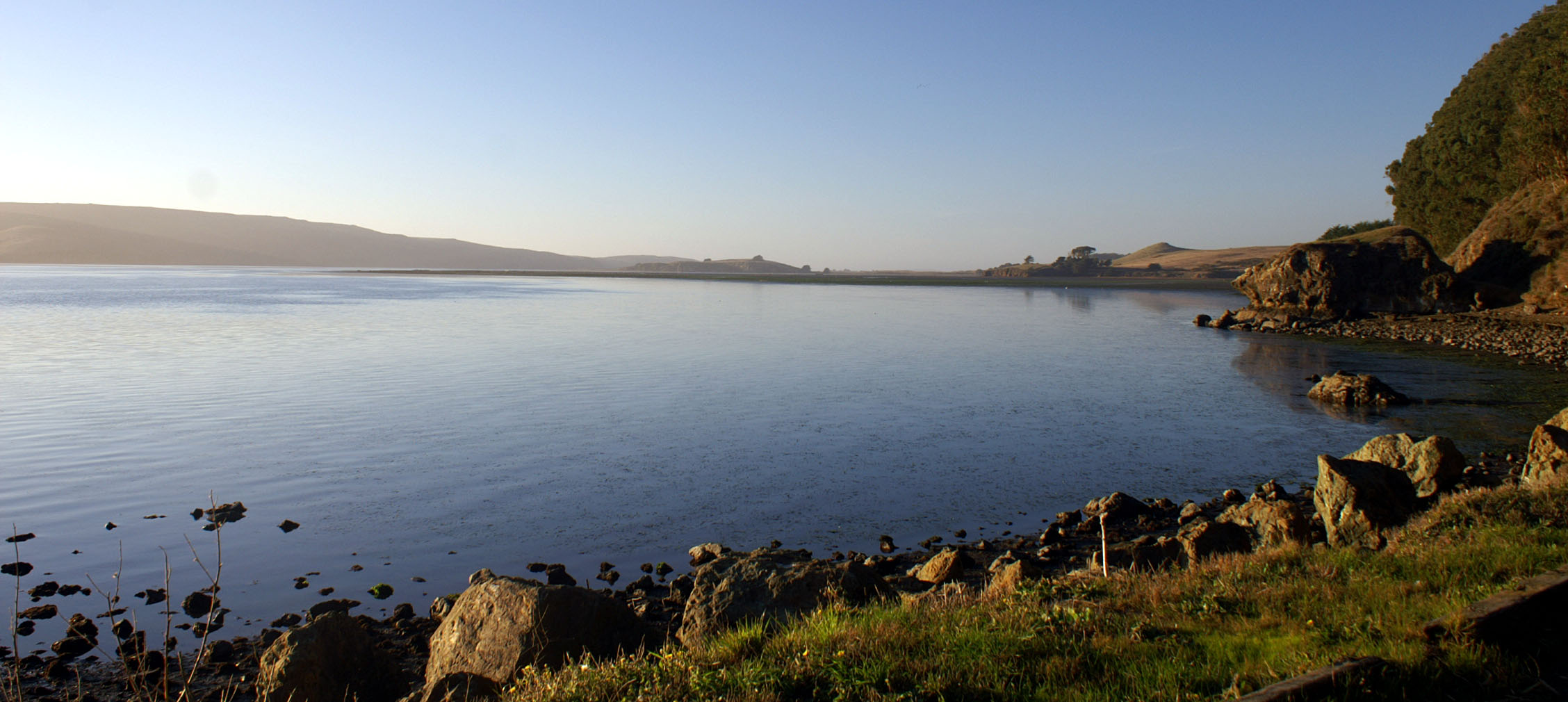
Tomales Bay Shoreline

Tomales Bay is approximately 15 mi (24 km) long and averages nearly 1.0 mi (1.6 km) wide, with relatively shallow depths averaging 18 ft, effectively separating the Point Reyes Peninsula from the mainland of Marin County. It is located approximately 30 mi (48 km) northwest of San Francisco. The bay forms the eastern boundary of Point Reyes National Seashore. Tomales Bay is recognized for protection by the California Bays and Estuaries Policy. On its northern end, it opens out onto Bodega Bay, which shelters it from the direct currents of the Pacific (especially the California Current). The bay is formed along a submerged portion of the San Andreas Fault. The fault divides the Point Reyes Peninsula through Tomales Bay in the north, and the Bolinas Lagoon in the south. The Bear Valley Visitor Center in Point Reyes Station is home to the Earthquake Trail, where visitors can see a visible rift formed on the fault during the 1906 San Francisco earthquake.

Towns bordering Tomales Bay include Inverness, Tomales, Inverness Park, Point Reyes Station, and Marshall. Additional hamlets include Nick's Cove, Spengers, Duck Cove, Shallow Beach, and Vilicichs. Dillon Beach lies just to the north of the mouth of the bay, and Tomales just to the east.

== Beaches ==
California State Parks department monitored, surf-free beaches on the bay include Heart's Desire, Shell Beach, Indian Beach, Pebble Beach, and Millerton Point. Most beaches require a hike-in, so if visiting, prepare with walkable shoes. Swimming, picnicking, sailing, kayaking, motorboating, and fishing are all popular activities on the bay.

== Water sports, oystering, and fishing ==
Watercraft may be launched on Tomales Bay from the public boat ramp at Nick's Cove, north of Marshall. The sandbar at the mouth of Tomales Bay is notoriously dangerous, with a long history of small-boat accidents.

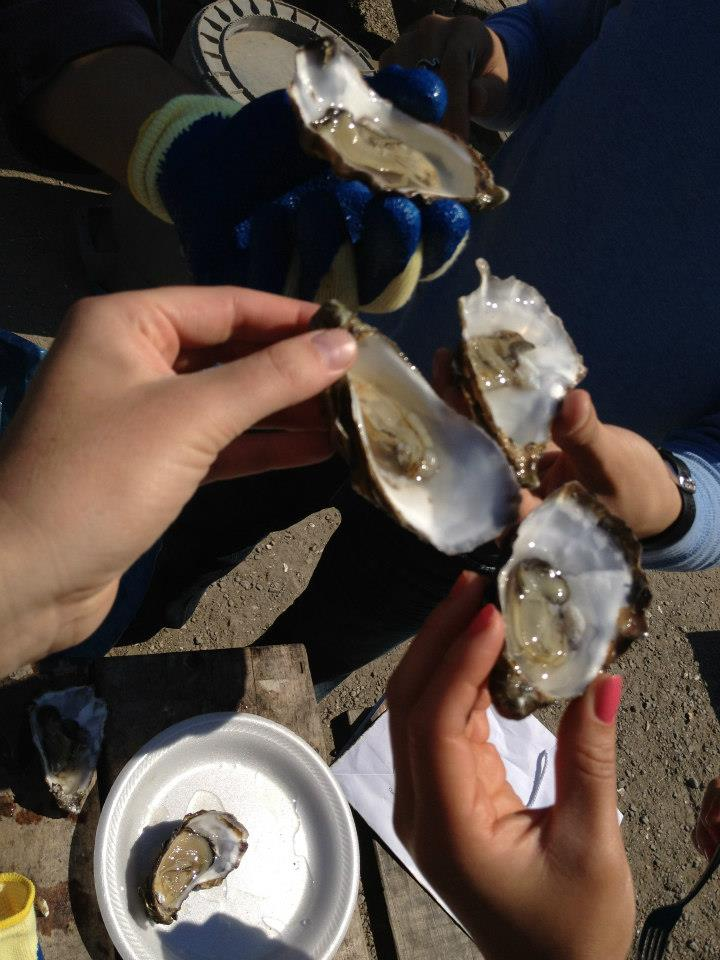
Tomales Bay oysters

Oyster farming is a major industry on the bay. The two largest producers are Hog Island Oyster Company and Tomales Bay Oyster Company, both of which retail oysters to the public and have picnic grounds on the east shore. Hillsides east of Tomales Bay are grazed by cows belonging to local dairies. There is also grazing land west of the bay, on farms and ranches leased from Point Reyes National Seashore.

The California Office of Environmental Health Hazard Assessment (OEHHA) has developed a safe eating advisory for fish caught here, based on levels of mercury or PCBs found in local species.

== Biology ==
The bay is home to many aquatic species, and its habitat diversity is supported by eelgrass beds and intertidal mudflats. In the bay’s waters, bony and cartilaginous fish species including halibut, coho salmon, bat rays and leopard sharks can be found. Along muddy parts of bay's shore, it is common to find the gastropods such as the invasive False Cerith snail, recognizable from its dextrally coiled shape and brown-gray pattern.

== History ==
=== Coast Miwok ===
The area surrounding Tomales Bay (Coast Miwok: Tamal Liwa) was once the territory of the Coast Miwok tribe. Documented villages in the area included Echa-kolum (south of Marshall), Sakloki (opposite Tomales Point), Shotommo-wi (near the mouth of the Estero de San Antonio), and Utumia (near Tomales). The tribe's history is deeply rooted in the bay and its surrounding areas. Fishing and hunting supported their livelihood, and shells and clams collected from the bay's shore served as currency.

=== Francis Drake ===
Francis Drake is thought to have landed in nearby Drakes Estero in 1579. Members of the Vizcaíno Expedition found the Bay in 1603, and thinking it a river, named it Rio Grande de San Sebastian.

=== European settlements ===
Early 19th-century settlements constituted the southernmost Russian colony in North America and were spread over an area stretching from Point Arena to Tomales Bay.

=== Railroad ===
The narrow gauge North Pacific Coast Railroad from Sausalito was constructed along the east side of the bay in 1874 and extended to the Russian River until it was dismantled in 1930.

=== Preservation efforts ===
Tomales Bay State Park was formed to preserve some of the bay shore; it opened to the public in 1952.

The Ramsar Convention, signed in 1971, listed Tomales Bay as a wetland of international importance.

The Giacomini Wetland Restoration Project, completed in 2008, returned to wetland several hundred acres at the south end of the bay that had been drained for grazing in the 1940s.

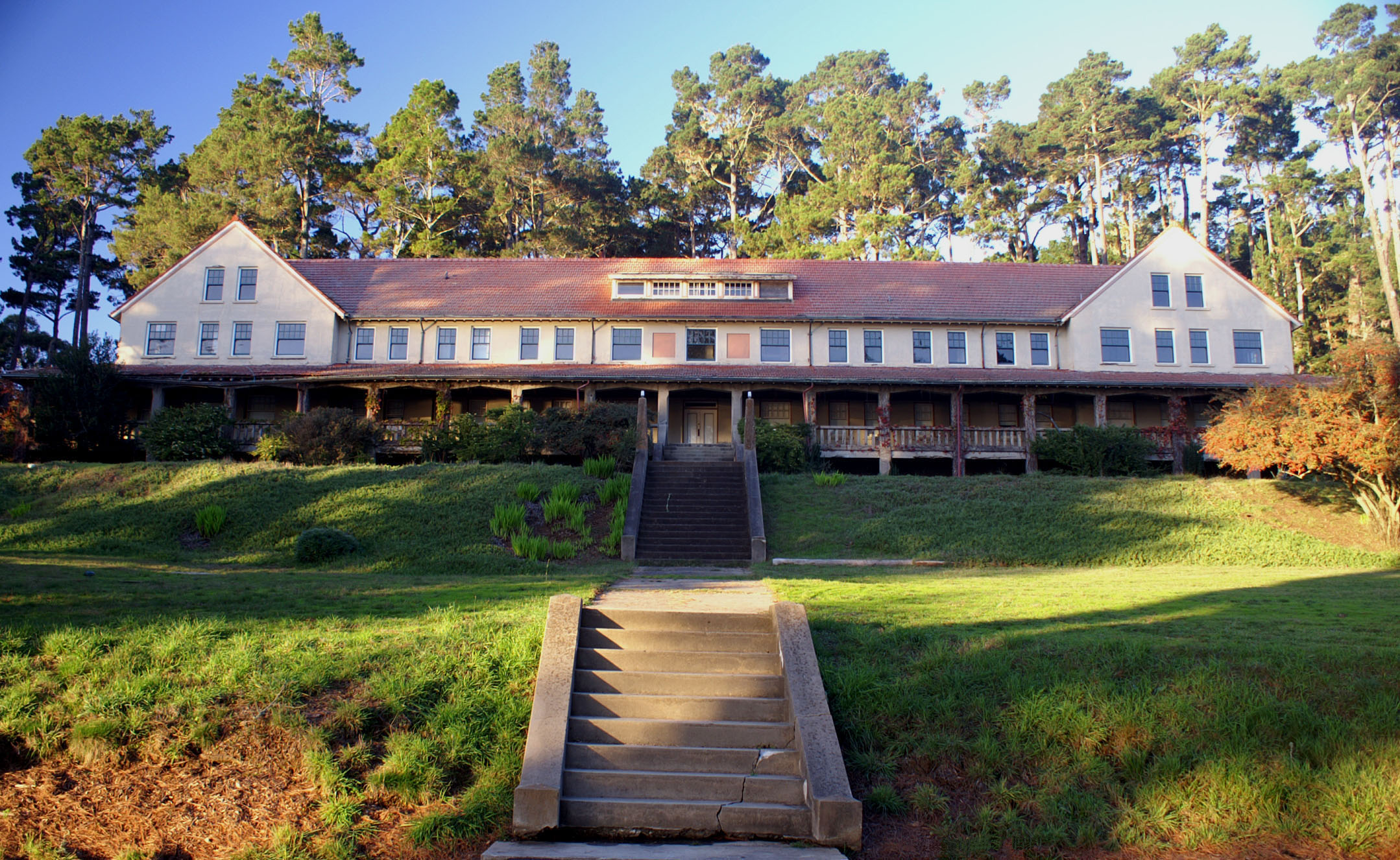
Marconi Conference Center

=== Lodge at Marconi ===
The Marconi State Historical Park (formerly Marconi Conference Center State Historic Park) preserves a small hotel built in 1913 by Guglielmo Marconi to house personnel who staffed his transpacific radio station nearby. RCA purchased the station from Marconi in 1920, and it closed in 1939, though other nearby radio stations on the Point Reyes Peninsula still operate today. It was purchased and used by the controversial new religious movement Synanon in 1964, and given to the state in 1984 to operate as a conference center.

== Gallery ==
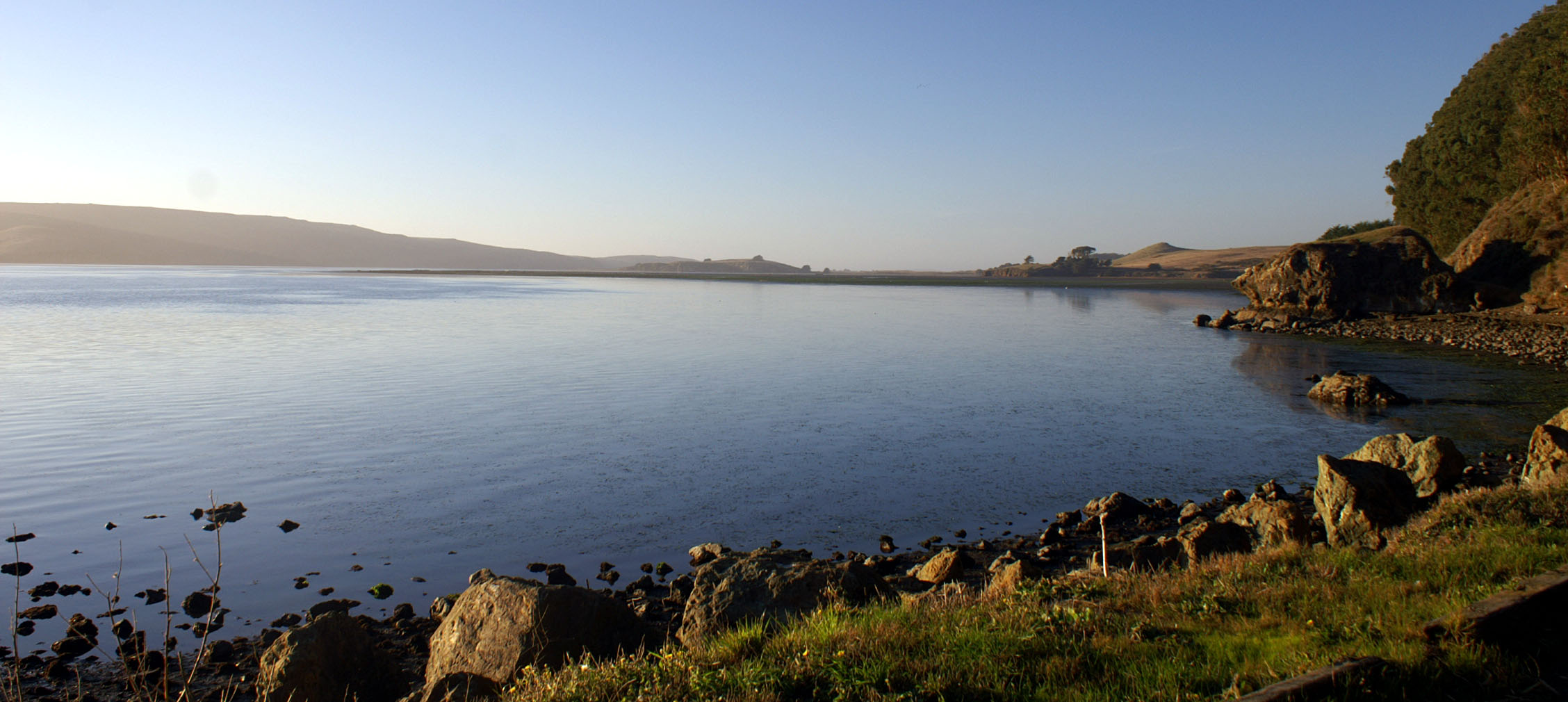
View of Tomales Bay towards the north

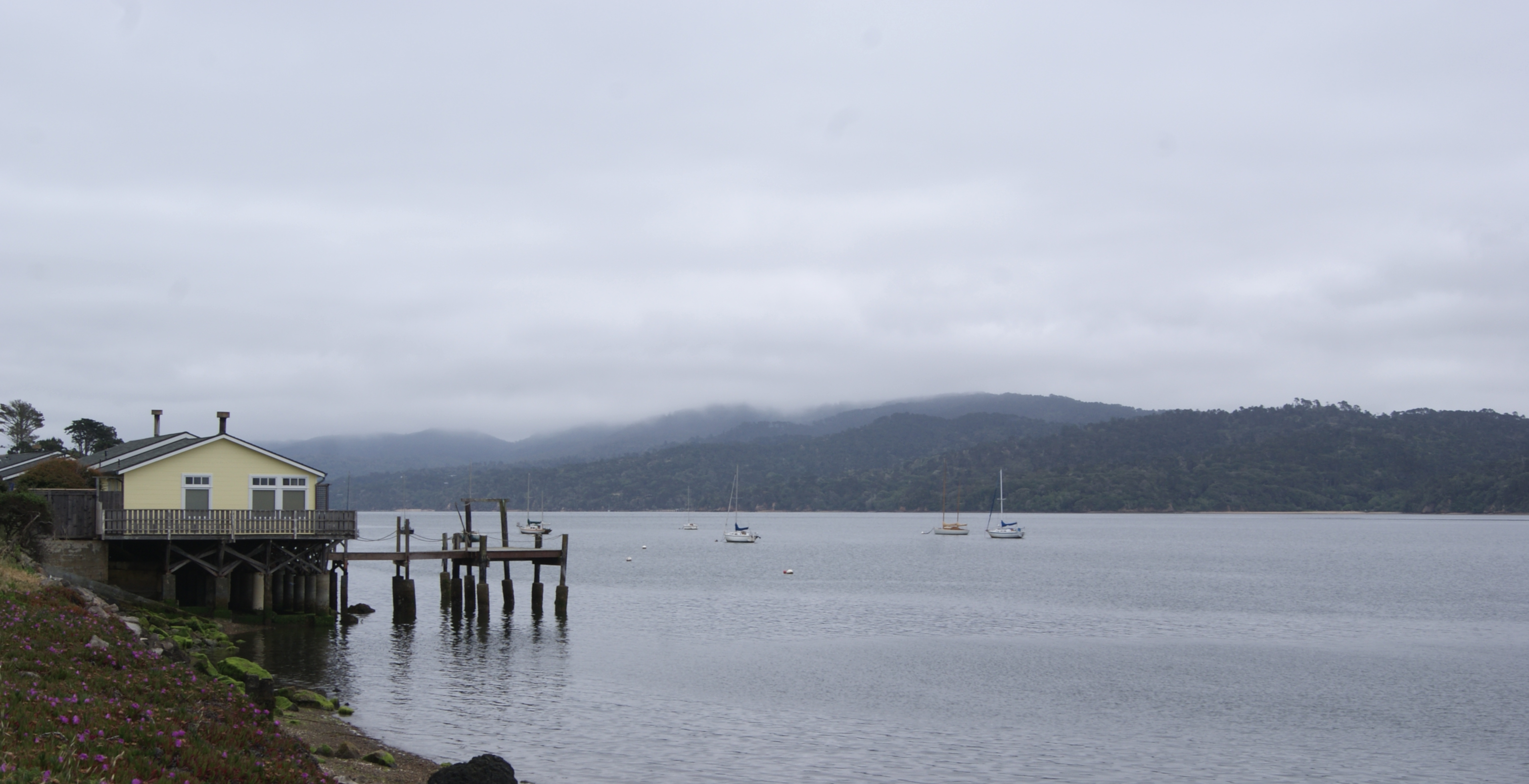
Tomales Bay near Marshall, California, looking south

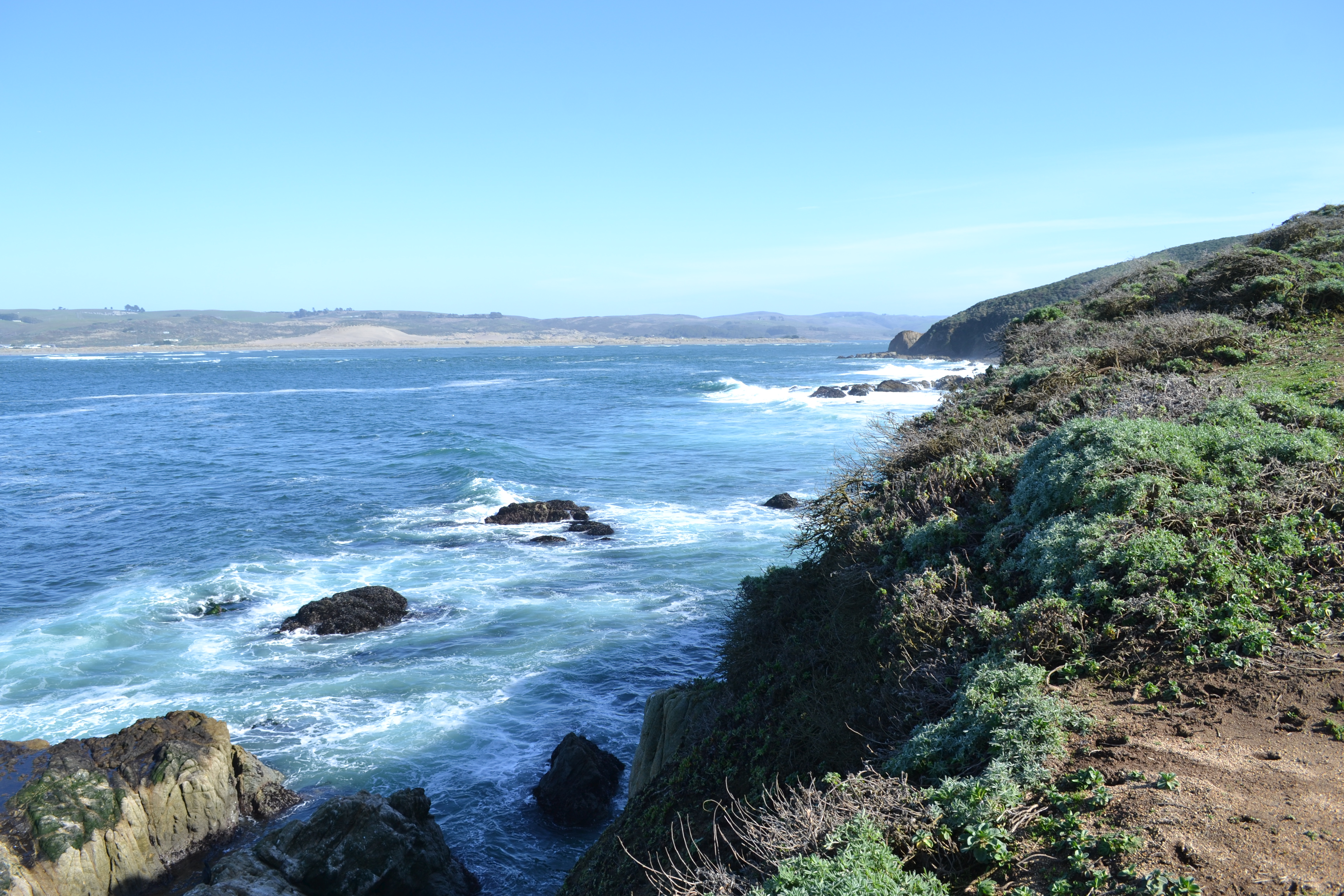
Entrance to Tomales Bay as viewed from Tomales Point, looking south

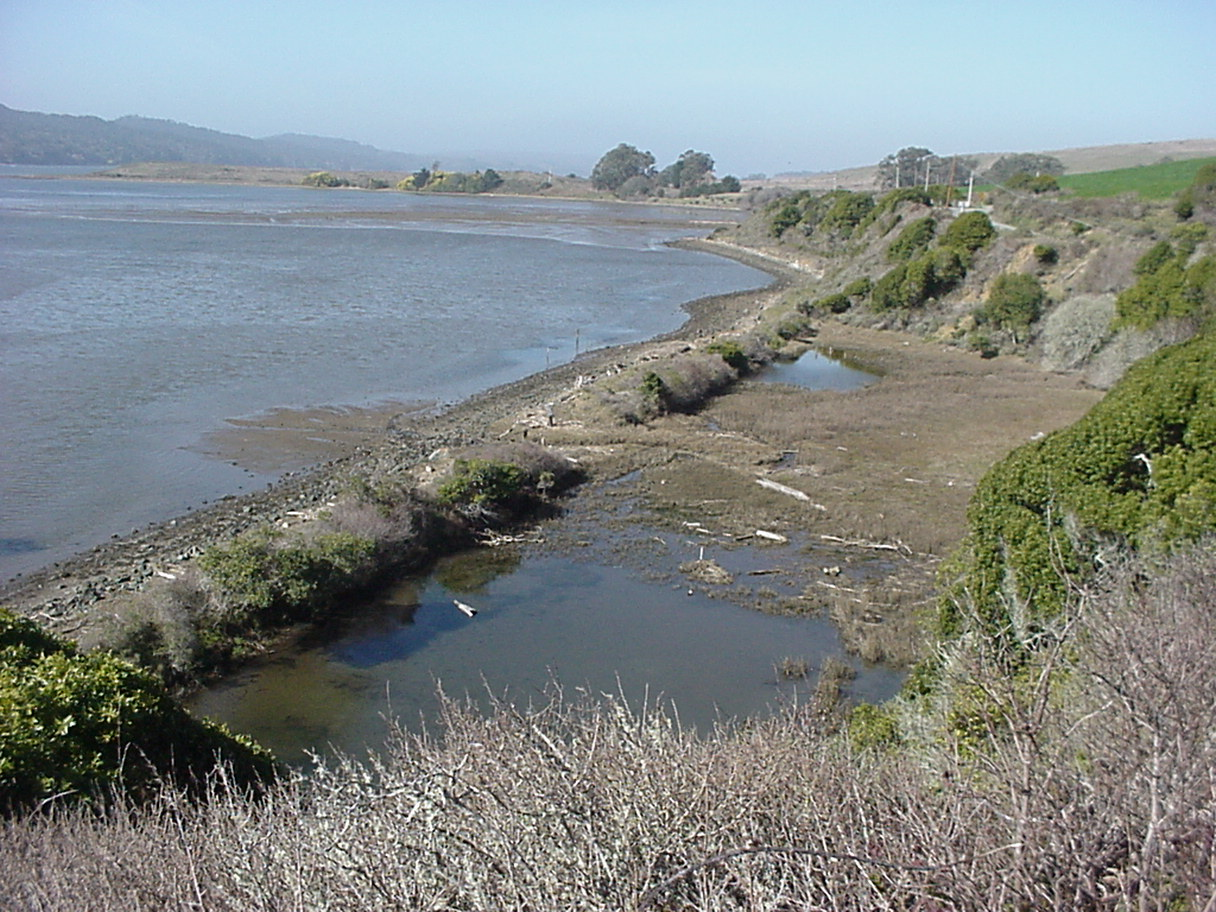
The former grade of the narrow gauge North Pacific Coast Railroad follows the east shore of the bay.

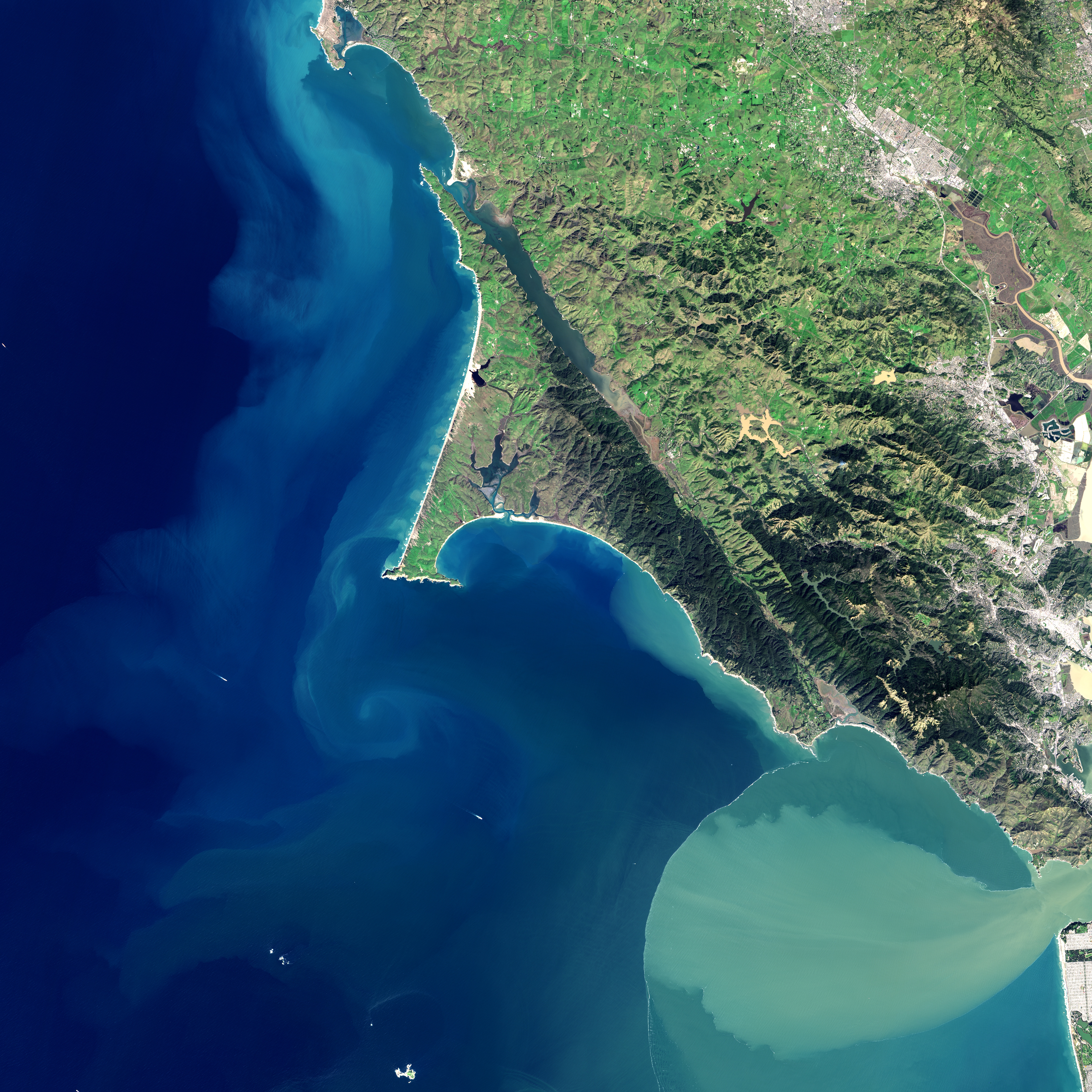
Satellite picture of Tomales Bay

== See also ==
- Hog Island (Tomales Bay)
- Drakes Bay — adjacent to the south
- Nova Albion
- Pacific herring
