= Tomales Bay Oyster Company =

Oyster farm in California

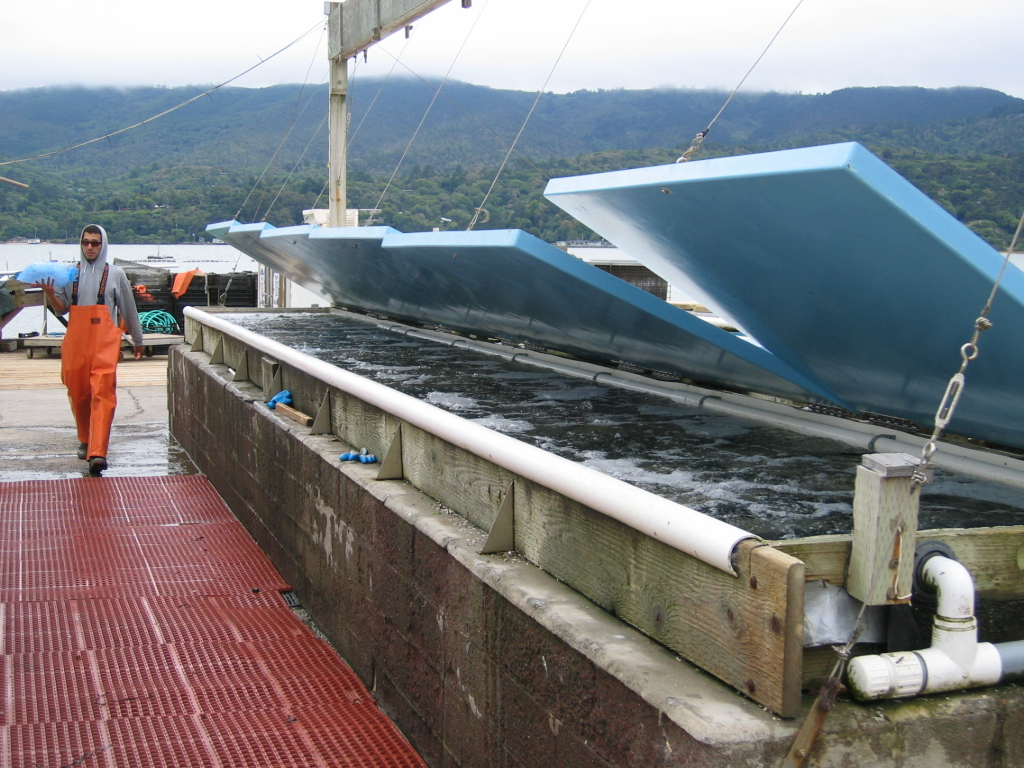
- Tomales Bay Oyster Company
- Company type: Private
- Industry: Oyster farming
- Founded: 1909; 117 years ago in Marshall, California, United States
- Products: Oysters

Tomales Bay Oyster Company (also called TBOC) is an oyster farm in Marshall, California in the United States. It is located on California State Route 1 and is the oldest continuously run oyster farm in California.

== History ==
TBOC was founded in 1909, making it the oldest continuously ran oyster farm in California. TBOC was co-owned by Tod Friend. (1947-2017) TBOC is currently owned and operated by Cathryn Irving and Heidi Gregory. TBOC sells two types of Pacific oysters in various sizes, and customers must take them away and shuck their own oysters.

The farm has so many visitors that the parking lot often overflows onto Highway One, causing traffic congestion. The parking has been described as "chaotic" by the North Bay Bohemian. They were in litigation with the California Coastal Commission regarding the farm's popularity, which the state says has increased beyond the capacity of its original permit allowance. The original permit, acquired in 1987, allows for Friday through Sunday retail sales and only eight employees. Starting in 2012, TBOC was providing retail sales seven days a week and had over eight employees.
