= Point Reyes Station, California =

Point Reyes Station
- Unincorporated Community; Census Designated Place
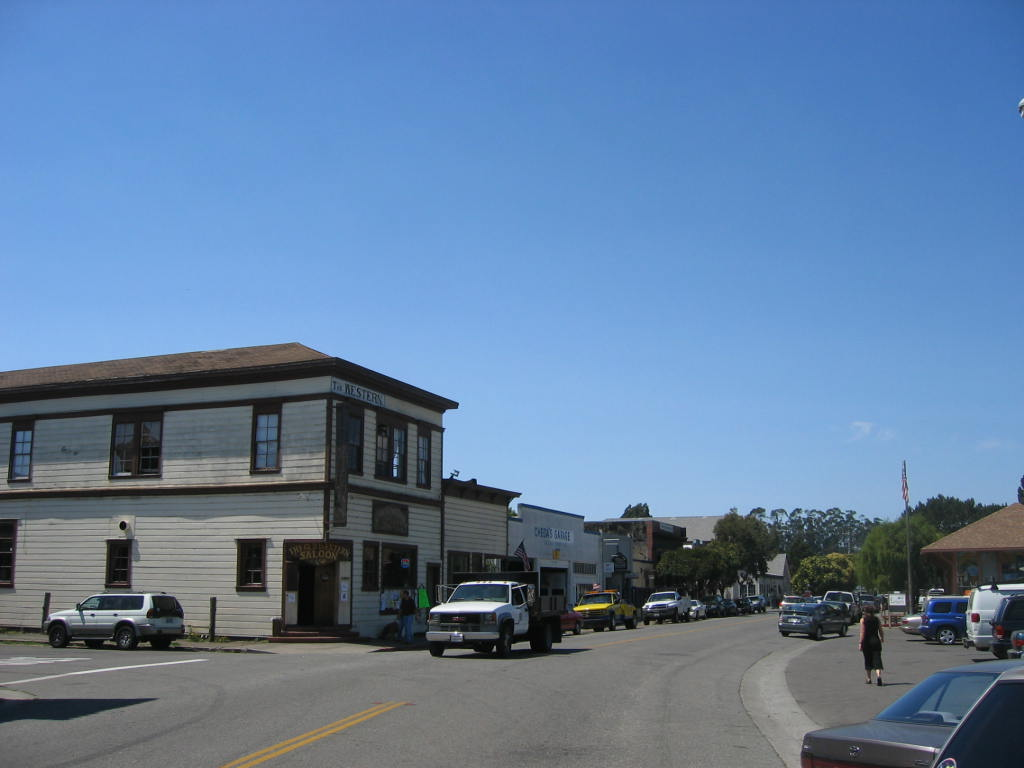
- State Route 1 runs through Point Reyes Station.

- Location in Marin County and the state of California

- Location in the United States
- Coordinates: 38°04′09″N 122°48′25″W
- Country: United States
- State: California
- County: Marin

Government
  - County Board: District 4 Dennis Rodoni
  - State Senator: Mike McGuire (D)
  - Assemblymember: Damon Connolly (D)
  - U. S. Rep.: Jared Huffman (D)

Area
  - Total: 3.615 sq mi (9.364 km^{2})
  - Land: 3.615 sq mi (9.364 km^{2})
  - Water: 0 sq mi (0 km^{2}) 0%
- Elevation: 39 ft (12 m)

Population (2020)
  - Total: 895
  - Density: 248/sq mi (95.6/km^{2})
- Time zone: UTC-8 (PST)
  - Summer (DST): UTC-7 (PDT)
- ZIP code: 94956
- Area codes: 415/628
- FIPS code: 06-57960
- GNIS feature ID: 1659413

Point Reyes Station (formerly Marin and Olema Station) is a small unincorporated town in western Marin County, California, United States. Point Reyes Station is located 13 miles (21 km) south-southeast of Tomales, at an elevation of 39 feet (12 m). Point Reyes Station is located along State Route 1 and is a gateway to the Point Reyes National Seashore, an extremely popular national preserve. The Point Reyes Station census-designated place (CDP) covers the unincorporated town and adjacent development to the north, with a total population of 895 as of the 2020 census.

== Geography ==
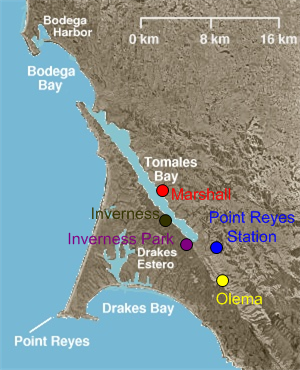
Towns of rural West Marin in Marin County. Point Reyes Station is in blue.

Point Reyes Station is located at 38°04′09″N 122°48′25″W, just south and east of the southern end of Tomales Bay, and slightly east of the San Andreas Fault just before the fault submerges down the center of Tomales Bay. Via State Route 1, it is 15 miles (24 km) northwest of Stinson Beach and 17 miles (27 km) southeast of Tomales. San Francisco is 42 miles (68 km) to the southeast via Point Reyes–Petaluma Road, Nicasio Valley Road, and Lucas Valley Road.

Formerly an actual port and railway terminus, Point Reyes Station nominally borders Tomales Bay. The introduction of European cattle and planting of European grass seed on the natural hills caused destructive erosion, and a combination of small dirt dams, silting, and intentional landfill for farming raised the level of former salt marshes and has left Point Reyes Station approximately 0.8 miles (1.3 km) from the nearest tidal flats, and that after expenditure of millions of dollars and recent efforts for reclamation of the natural environment.

The CDP has a total area of 3.62 square miles (9.38 km^{2}), all land.

== History ==
Once land of the Coast Miwok Indians, Point Reyes Station gets its name from the nearby Point Reyes Peninsula (a major peninsula sticking out into the Pacific Ocean) and its status as a terminus stop on the North Pacific Coast Railroad connecting Cazadero to the Sausalito ferry.

Point Reyes Station is very close to the San Andreas Fault, which was responsible for the 1906 San Francisco earthquake. At one time, the epicenter of the quake was thought to be near Olema. A walking tour of the fault can be taken from the Point Reyes National Seashore's Visitor Center.

The place was called "Olema Station" when the railroad arrived in 1875. The Point Reyes post office opened in 1882. Its name changed thrice in 1891: first to Marin, then back to Point Reyes, and finally to the modern Point Reyes Station.

== Demographics ==
Historical population
Census	Pop.	Note	%±
2000	818		—
2010	848		3.7%
2020	895		5.5%
U.S. Decennial Census; 1860–1870 1880-1890; 1900 1910 1920; 1930 1940 1950; 1960 1970 1980; 1990 2000 2010; 2020

Point Reyes Station first appeared as a census designated place in the 2000 U.S. census.

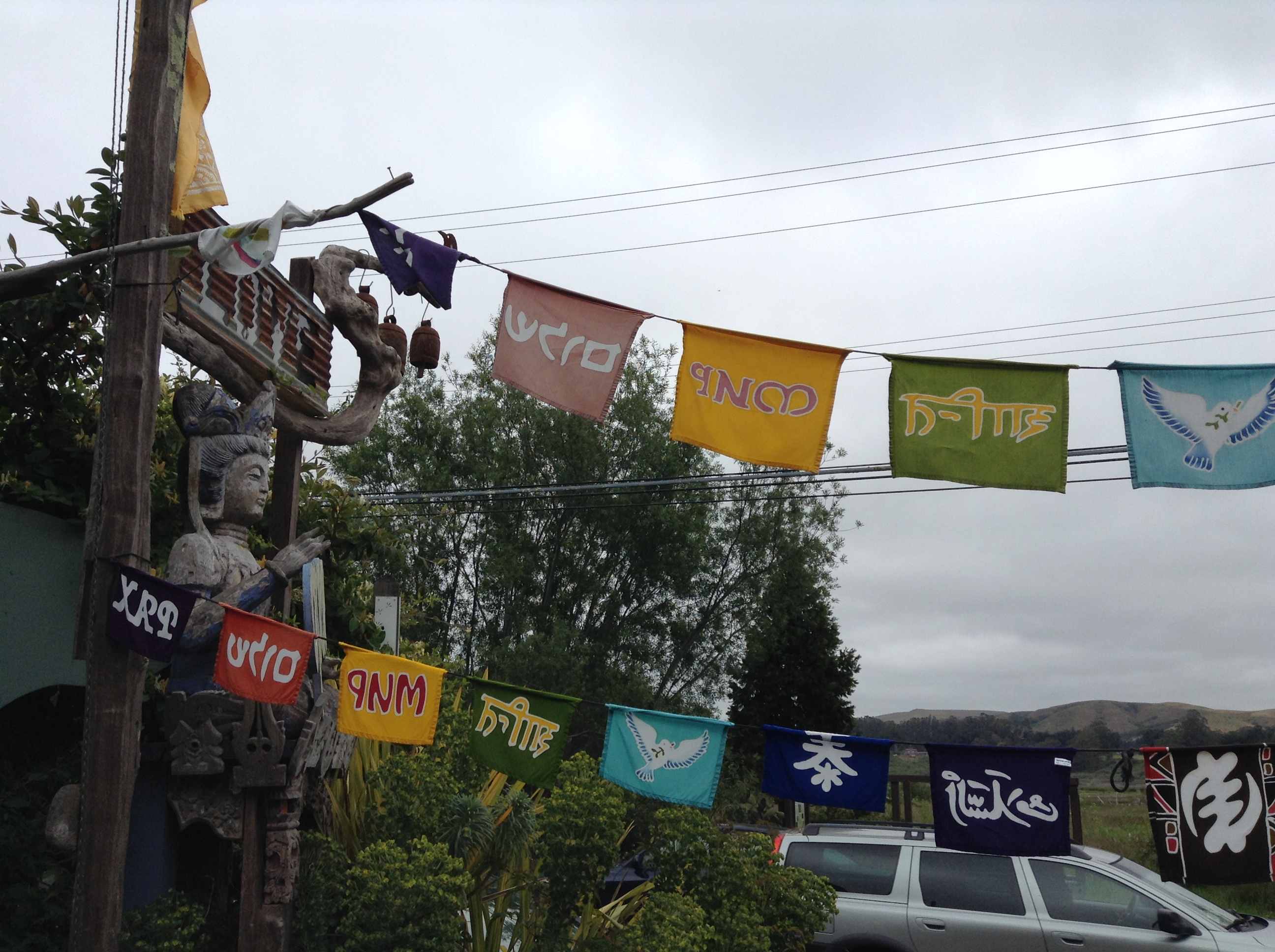
Prayer flags at Spirit Matters Store in Point Reyes, California

=== Racial and ethnic composition ===
Point Reyes Station CDP, California – Racial and ethnic composition Note: the US Census treats Hispanic/Latino as an ethnic category. This table excludes Latinos from the racial categories and assigns them to a separate category. Hispanics/Latinos may be of any race.
Race / Ethnicity (NH = Non-Hispanic)	Pop 2000	Pop 2010	Pop 2020	% 2000	% 2010	% 2020
White alone (NH)	714	660	649	87.29%	77.83%	72.51%
Black or African American alone (NH)	5	5	7	0.61%	0.59%	0.78%
Native American or Alaska Native alone (NH)	0	0	1	0.00%	0.00%	0.11%
Asian alone (NH)	2	9	16	0.24%	1.06%	1.79%
Native Hawaiian or Pacific Islander alone (NH)	0	0	4	0.00%	0.00%	0.45%
Other race alone (NH)	3	0	3	0.37%	0.00%	0.34%
Mixed race or Multiracial (NH)	18	19	32	2.20%	2.24%	3.58%
Hispanic or Latino (any race)	76	155	183	9.29%	18.28%	20.45%
Total	818	848	895	100.00%	100.00%	100.00%

=== 2020 ===
The 2020 United States census reported that the Point Reyes Station CDP had a population of 895. The population density was 247.5 inhabitants per square mile (95.6/km^{2}). The racial makeup of the CDP was 677 (75.6%) White, 9 (1.0%) African American, 11 (1.2%) Native American, 16 (1.8%) Asian, 4 (0.4%) Pacific Islander, 72 (8.0%) from other races, and 106 (11.8%) from two or more races. Hispanic or Latino of any race were 183 persons (20.4%).

The census reported that 879 people (98.2% of the population) lived in households and 16 (1.8%) were institutionalized.

There were 394 households, out of which 80 (20.3%) had children under the age of 18 living in them, 182 (46.2%) were married-couple households, 26 (6.6%) were cohabiting couple households, 131 (33.2%) had a female householder with no partner present, and 55 (14.0%) had a male householder with no partner present. 136 households (34.5%) were one person, and 84 (21.3%) were one person aged 65 or older. The average household size was 2.23. There were 228 families (57.9% of all households).

The age distribution was 130 people (14.5%) under the age of 18, 40 people (4.5%) aged 18 to 24, 154 people (17.2%) aged 25 to 44, 243 people (27.2%) aged 45 to 64, and 328 people (36.6%) who were 65 years of age or older. The median age was 56.0 years. For every 100 females, there were 86.1 males.

There were 487 housing units at an average density of 134.7 units per square mile (52.0 units/km^{2}), of which 394 (80.9%) were occupied. Of these, 229 (58.1%) were owner-occupied, and 165 (41.9%) were occupied by renters.

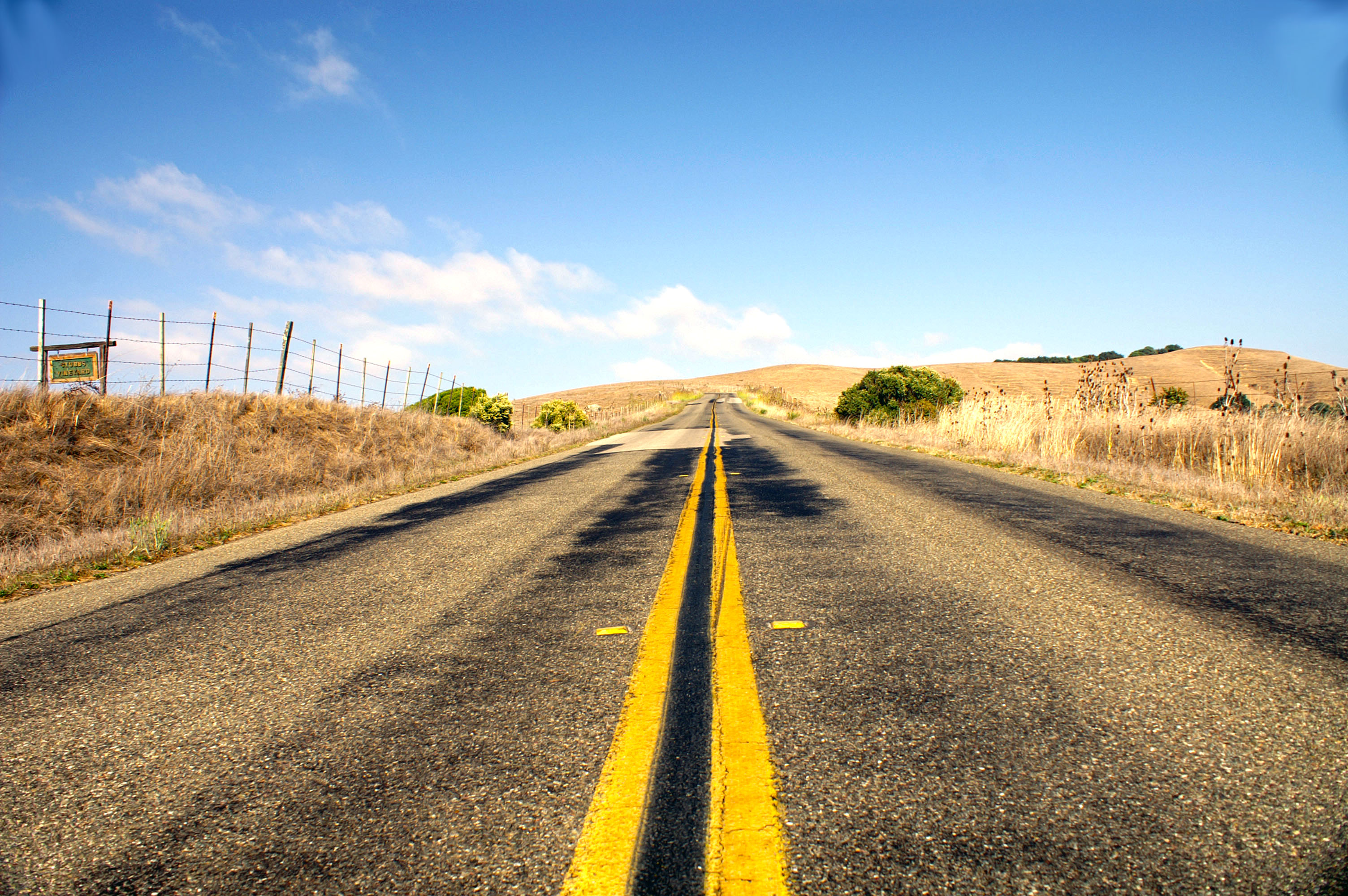
View of Point Reyes to Petaluma Road

== Economy ==
A number of agricultural companies, many using organic and sustainable practices, are located there, including Cowgirl Creamery and Point Reyes Farmstead Cheese Company. Marin Organic operates out of the city.

== Education ==
The CDP is served by the Shoreline Unified School District.

== See also ==
- List of people from Marin County, California
