= Marshall, California =

Unincorporated community in California, United States

Marshall
- Unincorporated community
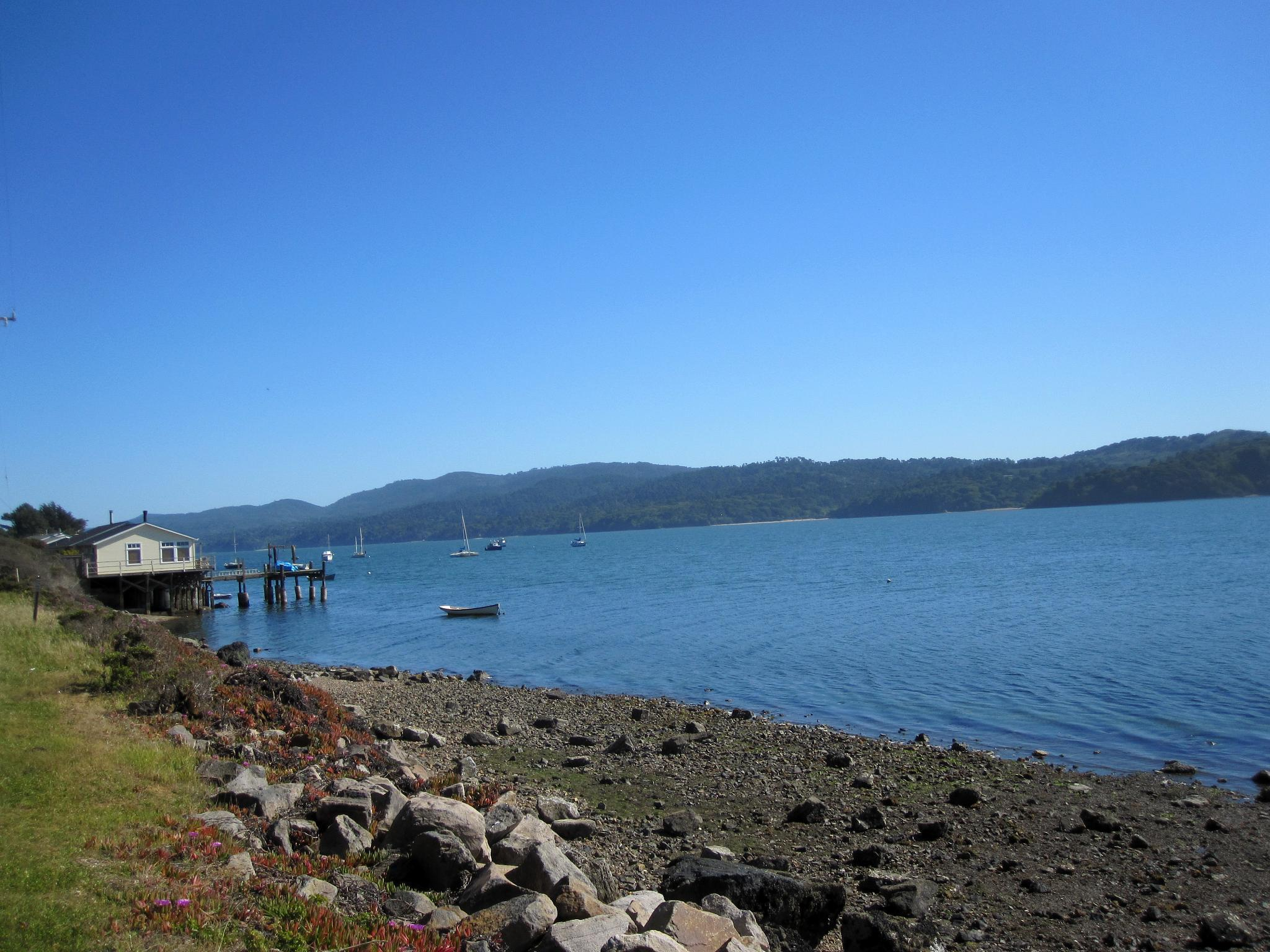
- Marshall shoreline

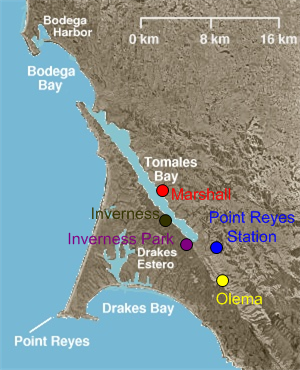
- Towns of rural western Marin County. Marshall is in red.

- Location within the state of California
- Coordinates: 38°9′38″N 122°53′39″W
- Country: United States
- State: California
- County: Marin
- Region: West Marin

Government
  - County Board: District 4 Dennis Rodoni
  - State Senator: Mike McGuire (D)
  - Assemblymember: Stephanie Nguyen (D)
  - U. S. Rep.: Jared Huffman (D)
- Elevation: 23 ft (7.0 m)

Population
  - Total: 400
- Time zone: UTC-8 (PST)
  - Summer (DST): UTC-7 (PDT)
- ZIP code: 94940
- Area codes: 415/628
- FIPS code: 06-46058
- GNIS feature ID: 228136

Marshall is an unincorporated community in Marin County, California, United States. It is located on the northeast shore of Tomales Bay, 6 mi (9.7 km) south of Tomales, at an elevation of 25 ft (7.6 m).

Marshall is located on the east shore of Tomales Bay. It has a population total that is unknown. It is located approximately 15 mi (24 km) southeast of Bodega Bay, on State Route 1. Its ZIP code is 94940.

The town is named after the Marshalls, four brothers who set up a dairying industry there in the 1850s. Starting in the 1870s, Marshall was a stop on the North Pacific Coast Railroad connecting Cazadero to the Sausalito ferry.

There is still some dairying in the area with Straus Family Creamery based there, but nowadays the town's major commerce is in oysters and clams, for which it is a center. It also acts as a center for tourists visiting Tomales Bay and the neighboring Point Reyes Peninsula.

== See also ==
- Tomales Bay Oyster Company
