= Straus Family Creamery =

Dairy company in California, US

Straus Family Creamery is a California organic dairy, located in Marshall in Marin County. They produce whole milk, reduced and non-fat milk (pasteurized, but not homogenized), butter, cheese, ice cream and yogurt. Their milk is used in the production of cheese at Cowgirl Creamery. Their milk is commonly sold in redeemable glass containers.

In 2021, the company moved its production from Marshall to a larger facility in Rohnert Park, California.
