= Cowgirl Creamery =

Creamery in Point Reyes Station, California

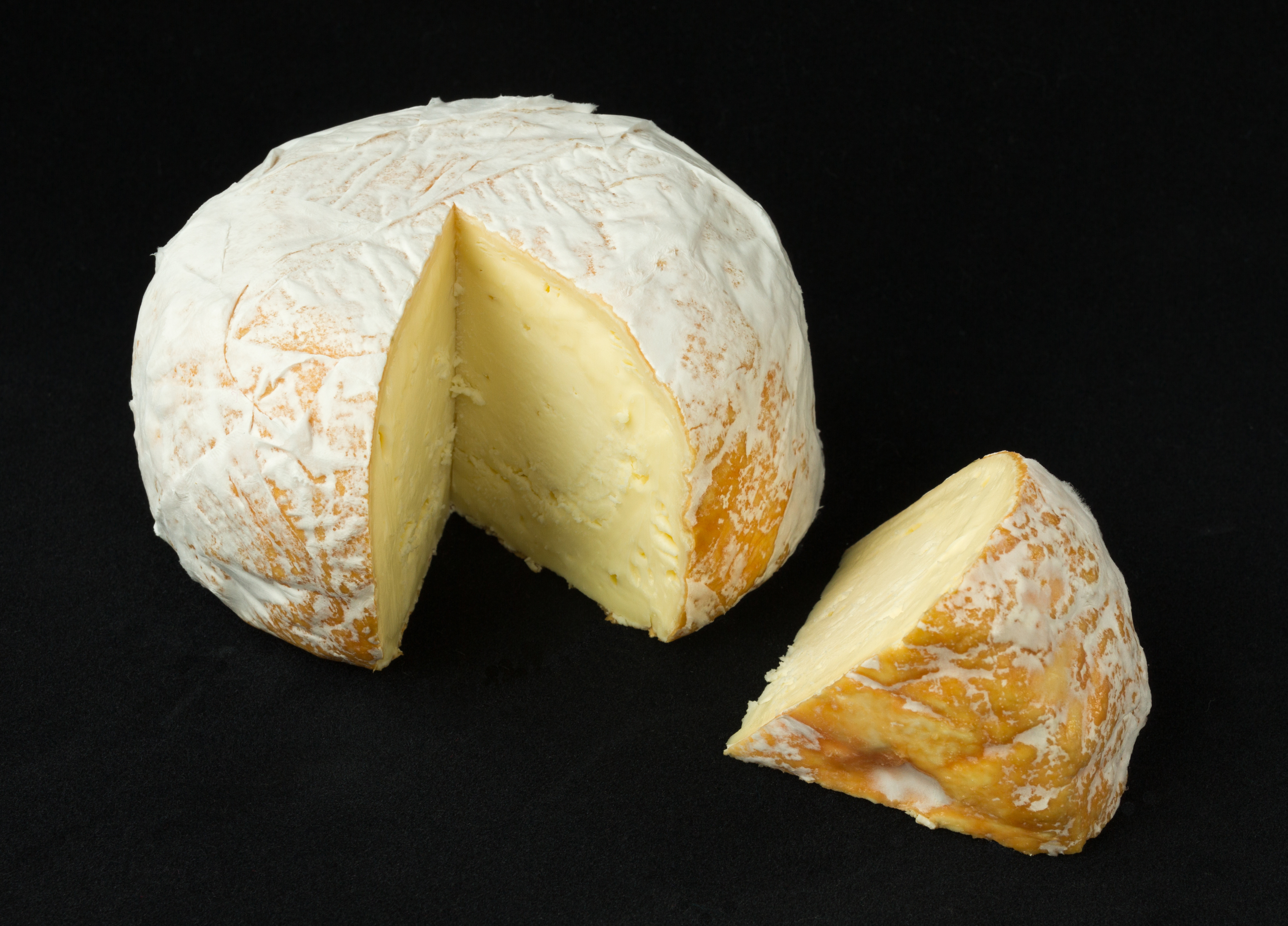
Red Hawk, one of Cowgirl Creameries' signature cheeses

Cowgirl Creamery is a company located in Petaluma, California, which manufactures artisan cheeses. Founded in 1994, the company manufactures its own cheeses and sells other imported and domestic cheese and fine artisan foods. Its own cheeses include Red Hawk and Mt. Tam (named after Mount Tamalpais). Until April 2021, the company operated a storefront in the Ferry Building of San Francisco. Founders Peggy Smith and Sue Conley worked for years in the kitchens of the Bay Area, and Alice Waters' Chez Panisse, where Peggy worked for many years, is among many Bay Area establishments to incorporate cheeses from Cowgirl Creamery into its menu.

== Cheesemaking ==
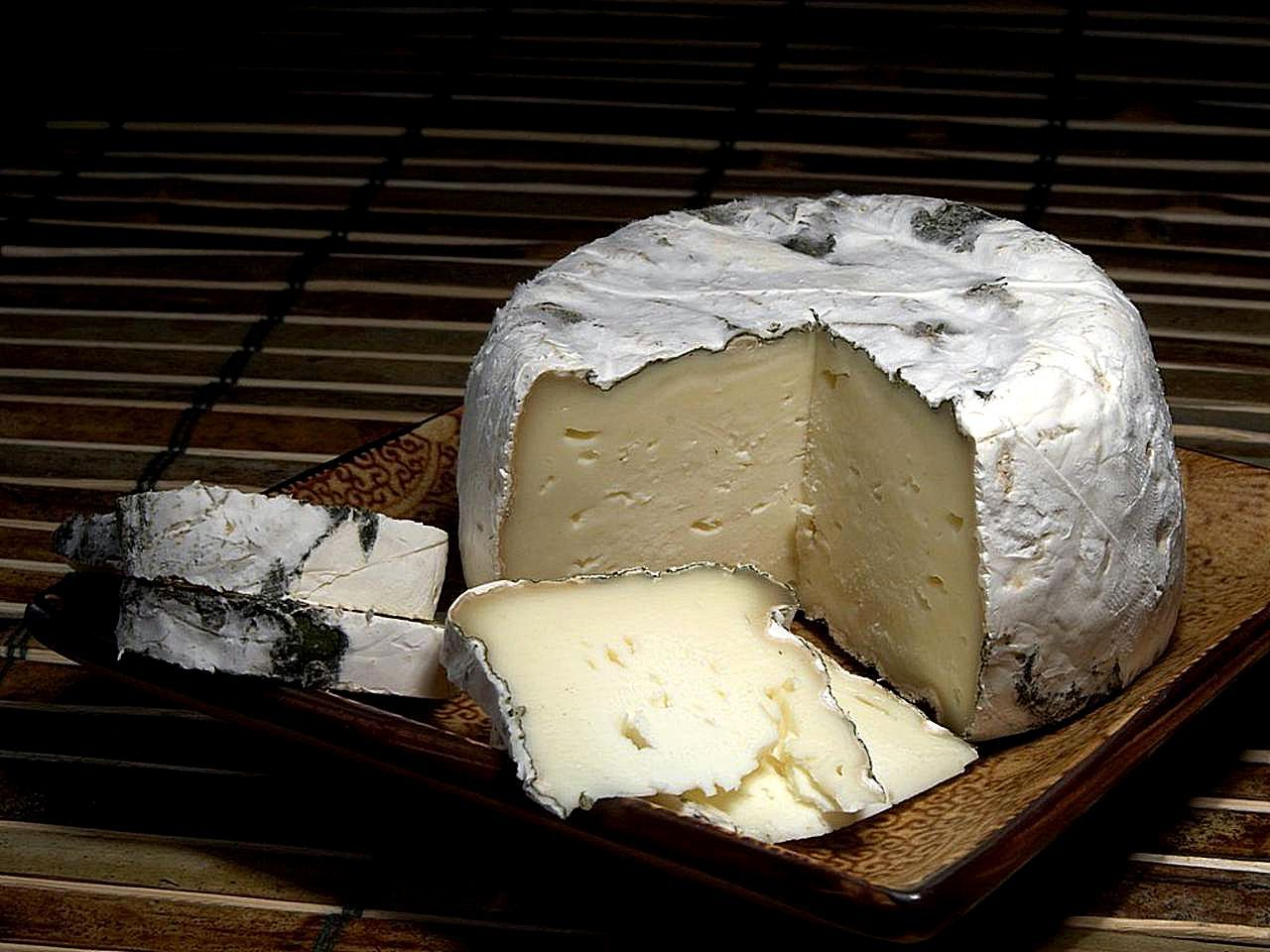
St Pat, a spring seasonal cheese

Cowgirl Creamery crafts its own cheeses using organic milk from the neighboring Straus Family Creamery, as well as John Tavernas' dairy. Mount Tam, a triple cream cheese similar to Explorateur, and Red Hawk, also a triple cream, with a washed rind, are the more well-known of their aged cheeses, but the company also makes four seasonal soft cheeses: Pierce Point, Saint Pat, Chimney Rock, and Devil's Gulch. Only two of their aged cheeses are in a slightly different format: Inverness looks like an aged goat cheese but is actually made with cow's milk, and is only available at Cowgirl's stores due to a short shelf life; Wagon Wheel, which is a semi-firm cheese designed to melt, is made in 25-pound wheels. Their most recent cheese is the semi-firm Hopalong. They very, very rarely make an unpublicized aged cheese, Sir Francis Drake, which is the same size, shape, and base as the Mount Tam, but is washed in Muscat wine and topped with macerated currants and has a stronger, sweeter flavor.

Their aged cheeses are named after landmarks or other features local to the Marin Headlands. Cowgirl Creamery also makes fresh cheeses: a fromage blanc and a crème fraiche and recently resumes making their clabbered cottage cheese; they no longer make Niloufer's Panir (which is named for chef Niloufer Ichaporia King).

== History ==
The company was started in 1994. In addition to its San Francisco store and Sidekick Cafe, the original creamery in Point Reyes Station includes a store and cantina, and a storefront in the Penn Quarter neighborhood of Washington, D.C. (where founders Sue Conley and Peggy Smith are from) was open from 2006 to 2013.

On May 17, 2016, the company announced that they had been acquired by the publicly traded Swiss dairy company Emmi AG.

== Popular culture ==
Cowgirl Creamery was referenced in episode 6.1 of the popular TV sitcom Will & Grace, "Dames at Sea", in the scene where Will is trying to ease the mind of Jack in suspicions of a drunken rendezvous with each other.

== See also ==
- List of cheesemakers
