= Tomales, California =

Tomales
- Unincorporated Community; Census Designated Place
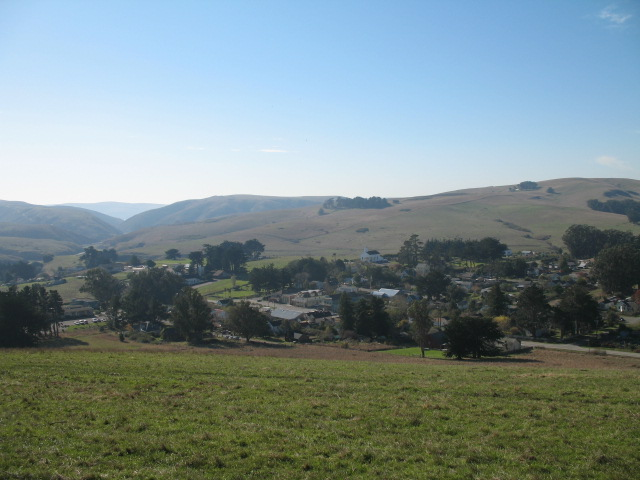
- Tomales, viewed from the northeast

- Location in Marin County and the state of California

- Location in the United States
- Coordinates: 38°14′47″N 122°54′20″W
- Country: United States
- State: California
- County: Marin

Government
  - County Board: District 4 Dennis Rodoni
  - State Senator: Mike McGuire (D)
  - Assemblymember: Damon Connolly (D)
  - U. S. Rep.: Jared Huffman (D)

Area
  - Total: 0.332 sq mi (0.859 km^{2})
  - Land: 0.332 sq mi (0.859 km^{2})
  - Water: 0 sq mi (0 km^{2}) 0%
- Elevation: 89 ft (27 m)

Population (2020)
  - Total: 187
  - Density: 564/sq mi (218/km^{2})
- Time zone: UTC-8 (PST)
  - Summer (DST): UTC-7 (PDT)
- ZIP code: 94971
- Area code: 707
- FIPS code: 06-78890
- GNIS feature ID: 236439

Tomales is a census-designated place (CDP) on State Route 1 in Marin County, California, United States. The population was 187 at the 2020 census.

== Geography ==
Tomales is located above Keys Creek, approximately 3 mi (5 km) northeast of Tomales Bay. The nearest city is Petaluma, 16 miles (26 km) to the east by road, and the nearest large city is San Francisco, about 75 minutes (58 miles (93 km)) to the south.

The CDP has a total area of 0.33 square miles (0.85 km^{2}), all land.

== History ==
When Europeans first reached Tomales Bay, it was home to Coast Miwok people. Numerous authenticated Miwok villages are known from this area, including one (named Utumia) sited near the present-day town of Tomales.

The "Tomalles" post office opened in 1854, and changed its spelling to "Tomales" before 1879.

Starting in the 1870s, Tomales was a stop on the North Pacific Coast Railroad connecting Cazadero to the Sausalito ferry.

Built near the San Andreas Fault, Tomales was affected by the 1906 San Francisco earthquake. One of the town's two cemeteries predates the earthquake, and the damage to the pre-1906 plots shows just how widespread the quake's effects were.

== Demographics ==
Historical population
Census	Pop.	Note	%±
2000	210		—
2010	204		−2.9%
2020	187		−8.3%
U.S. Decennial Census; 1860–1870 1880-1890; 1900 1910 1920; 1930 1940 1950; 1960 1970 1980; 1990 2000 2010; 2020

Tomales first appeared as a census designated place in the 2000 U.S. census.

=== Racial and ethnic composition ===
Tomales CDP, California – Racial and ethnic composition Note: the US Census treats Hispanic/Latino as an ethnic category. This table excludes Latinos from the racial categories and assigns them to a separate category. Hispanics/Latinos may be of any race.
Race / Ethnicity (NH = Non-Hispanic)	Pop 2000	Pop 2010	Pop 2020	% 2000	% 2010	% 2020
White alone (NH)	198	184	157	94.29%	90.20%	83.96%
Black or African American alone (NH)	1	0	0	0.48%	0.00%	0.00%
Native American or Alaska Native alone (NH)	2	3	4	0.95%	1.47%	2.14%
Asian alone (NH)	3	4	4	1.43%	1.96%	2.14%
Native Hawaiian or Pacific Islander alone (NH)	0	0	0	0.00%	0.00%	0.00%
Other race alone (NH)	0	0	1	0.00%	0.00%	0.53%
Mixed race or Multiracial (NH)	1	4	7	0.48%	1.96%	3.74%
Hispanic or Latino (any race)	5	9	14	2.38%	4.41%	7.49%
Total	210	204	187	100.00%	100.00%	100.00%

=== 2020 ===
The 2020 United States census reported that Tomales had a population of 187. The population density was 563.3 inhabitants per square mile (217.5/km^{2}). The racial makeup of Tomales was 157 (84.0%) White, 0 (0.0%) African American, 4 (2.1%) Native American, 5 (2.7%) Asian, 0 (0.0%) Pacific Islander, 8 (4.3%) from other races, and 13 (7.0%) from two or more races. Hispanic or Latino of any race were 14 persons (7.5%).

The census reported that 182 people (97.3% of the population) lived in households, 5 (2.7%) lived in non-institutionalized group quarters, and no one was institutionalized.

There were 86 households, out of which 17 (19.8%) had children under the age of 18 living in them, 44 (51.2%) were married-couple households, 4 (4.7%) were cohabiting couple households, 17 (19.8%) had a female householder with no partner present, and 21 (24.4%) had a male householder with no partner present. 22 households (25.6%) were one person, and 18 (20.9%) were one person aged 65 or older. The average household size was 2.12. There were 57 families (66.3% of all households).

The age distribution was 16 people (8.6%) under the age of 18, 8 people (4.3%) aged 18 to 24, 38 people (20.3%) aged 25 to 44, 63 people (33.7%) aged 45 to 64, and 62 people (33.2%) who were 65 years of age or older. The median age was 57.2 years. There were 90 males and 97 females.

There were 108 housing units at an average density of 325.3 units per square mile (125.6 units/km^{2}), of which 86 (79.6%) were occupied. Of these, 53 (61.6%) were owner-occupied, and 33 (38.4%) were occupied by renters.

=== 2010 ===
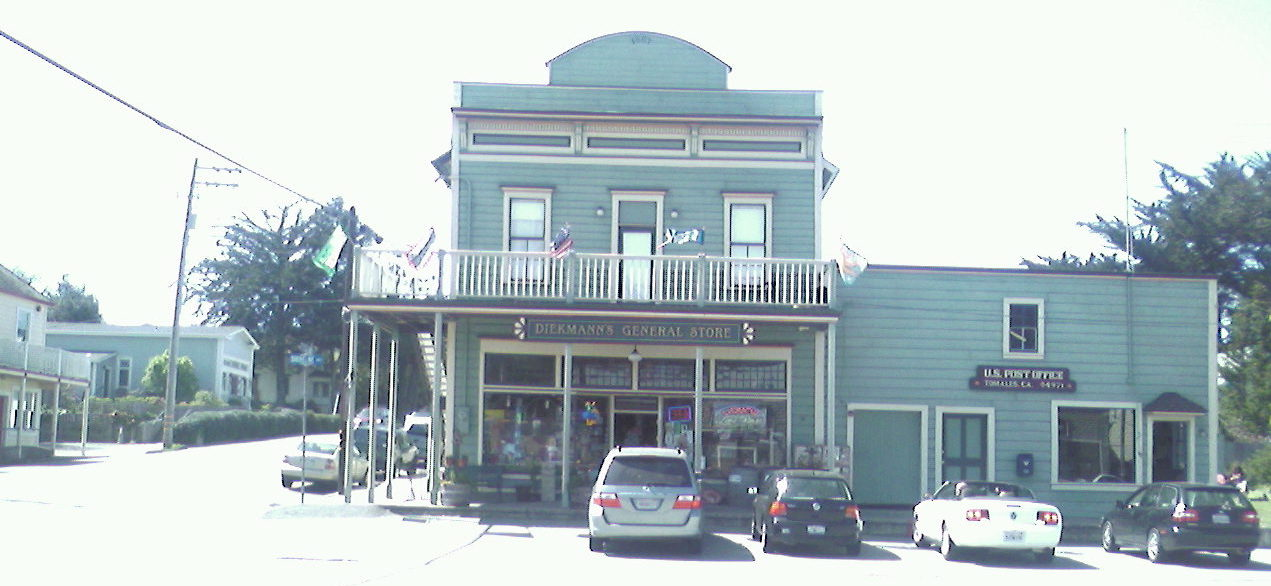
General store and post office in Tomales

At the 2010 census Tomales had a population of 204. The population density was 614.9 inhabitants per square mile (237.4/km^{2}). The racial makeup of the CDP was 94.6% White, 1.5% Native American, 2.0% Asian, and 2.0% from two or more races. 4.4% of the population was Hispanic or Latino of any race.

The census reported that 100% of the population lived in households.

There were 99 households, 13 (13.1%) had children under the age of 18 living in them, 47 (47.5%) were opposite-sex married couples living together, 9 (9.1%) had a female householder with no husband present, 2 (2.0%) had a male householder with no wife present. There were 10 (10.1%) unmarried opposite-sex partnerships, and 1 (1.0%) same-sex married couple or partnership. 32 households (32.3%) were one person and 6 (6.1%) had someone living alone who was 65 or older. The average household size was 2.06. There were 58 families (58.6% of households); the average family size was 2.55.

The age distribution was 22 people (10.8%) under the age of 18, 12 people (5.9%) aged 18 to 24, 43 people (21.1%) aged 25 to 44, 93 people (45.6%) aged 45 to 64, and 34 people (16.7%) who were 65 or older. The median age was 50.5 years. For every 100 females, there were 85.5 males. For every 100 females age 18 and over, there were 80.2 males.

There were 122 housing units at an average density of 367.7 per square mile (142.0/km^{2}), of which 59.6% were owner-occupied and 40.4% were occupied by renters. The homeowner vacancy rate was 1.6%; the rental vacancy rate was 7.0%. 61.8% of the population lived in owner-occupied housing units and 38.2% lived in rental housing units.

=== 2000 ===
At the 2000 census, the median household income was $51,953 and the median family income was $52,708. Males had a median income of $41,607 versus $46,389 for females. The per capita income for the CDP was $26,609. None of the families and 14.3% of the population were living below the poverty line, including no under eighteens and 14.3% of those over 64.

== Education ==
The CDP is served by the Shoreline Unified School District. Shoreline USD operates Tomales Elementary School and Tomales High School. The high school is the largest employer in Tomales and has a student body of approximately 190 from northwestern Marin County and southwestern Sonoma County.

== In popular culture ==
Much of the 2001 movie Bandits was filmed in and around Tomales, as were the opening shots of Mumford (1999), and parts of Scream (1996), and Village of the Damned (1995).
