= Rancho Punta de los Reyes =

Mexican land grant in California

Coordinates: 37.960°N 122.650°W

Rancho Punta de los Reyes was a 13,645-acre (55.22 km^{2}) Mexican land grant in present day Marin County, California, given in 1836 by Governor Nicolás Gutiérrez to James Richard Berry. The grant was east of Rancho Las Baulines and south of Rancho Tomales y Baulines.

== History ==
James Richard Berry (–1847), an Irishman and a colonel in the Mexican army, came to California from Mexico. In 1836, Governor Gutierriez, granted Berry the eight square league Rancho Punta de los Reyes. In 1838, Berry sold the two square league portion along the western shore of Tomales Bay (known as the "Inverness Pocket") of the Rancho Punta de los Reyes grant, to Joseph Snook (1798–1848), grantee of Rancho San Bernardo. When, in 1843, Rafael Garcia, the owner of adjacent Rancho Tomales y Baulines, moved his cattle onto Berry’s remaining land, Berry moved west, squatting on Antonio Osio’s Rancho Punta de los Reyes Sobrante. In 1844, Berry sold Rancho Punta de los Reyes to Stephen Smith of Rancho Bodega, to whom he owed money. Berry moved to John Martin’s Rancho Corte Madera de Novato and died there in 1847. In 1848, Smith sold Rancho Punta de los Reyes to Bethuel Phelps.

With the cession of California to the United States following the Mexican-American War, the 1848 Treaty of Guadalupe Hidalgo provided that the land grants would be honored. As required by the Land Act of 1851, a claim for Rancho Punta de los Reyes was filed with the Public Land Commission in 1853, and the grant was patented to Bethuel Phelps in 1866.

In 1854, Bethuel Phelps sold Rancho Punta de los Reyes to Andrew Randall. Randall (1819–1856), a native of Rhode Island, came to California on the U.S.S. Portsmouth in 1846. Randall was a geologist with medical training. He founded, and was elected chairman of the California Academy of Sciences. In addition to Rancho Punta de los Reyes and Rancho Punta de los Reyes Sobrante in Marin County, Randall was the claimant for Rancho Cañada de la Segunda and Rancho San Lorenzo in Monterey County; and Rancho Aguas Frias in Butte County - a little over 110,000 acres (445 km^{2}). However, he had stretched his credit to the limit, and Randall could not or would not pay immediately. Joseph Hetherington, a creditor, undertook to force payment by hounding him on every occasion with insults and threats. Hetherington fatally shot Randall in a San Francisco hotel on July 24, 1856, and the Committee of Vigilance hanged Hetherington on July 29, 1856.

In 1857, the complex real estate litigation resulted in the law firm of Oscar L. Shafter and James McMillan Shafter winning a victory for their client of 75,000 acres of farm land at Point Reyes in Marin County. The client sold the property to the Shafters. They leased it to dairy farmers who provided milk and butter to an ever-growing San Francisco and prospered. The Shafter families owned most of Point Reyes from 1857 to 1919, when the land was sold in parcels.

The National Park Service acquired the land on Point Reyes to form the Point Reyes National Seashore.

== See also ==
- Ranchos of California
- List of Ranchos of California
