= Muddy Hollow Creek =

Stream in California

- Location of the mouth of Muddy Hollow Creek in California

Location
- Country: United States
- State: California
- Region: Marin County, California

Physical characteristics
- Source: Western slope of Inverness Ridge
  - coordinates: 38°04′34.4″N 122°51′15.1″W
  - elevation: 778 ft (237 m)
- Mouth: Estero de Limantour
  - coordinates: 38°01′59″N 122°53′06.2″W
  - elevation: 6 ft (1.8 m)

Muddy Hollow Creek is a 4.5-mile-long (7.2 km) southwest-flowing stream in northern California. It is a tributary to Estero de Limantour within Point Reyes National Seashore's Phillip Burton Wilderness in west Marin County, California. From Estero de Limantour, its waters flow into Drakes Bay and the Pacific Ocean.

== History ==
Muddy Hollow Creek is named for Muddy Hollow, a basin in the mid- to lower-reaches of the stream. Muddy Hollow Ranch was established by George Steele about 1857, but he soon lost the ranch and had to lease it back from lawyer and politician James McMillan Shafter. Muddy Hollow Ranch was eventually sold to the National Park Service in 1963.

== Watershed and Course ==
Muddy Hollow Creek begins on the western slope of Inverness Ridge at elevation 778 feet (237 m), with ephemeral tributaries reaching as high as 1,076 feet (328 m). It is the easternmost tributary to Estero de Limantour. It has several unnamed subtributaries and drains a total watershed of 3.2 square miles (8.3 km^{2}).

== Ecology ==
Although the Muddy Hollow Creek watershed was 100% burned in the 1995 Mt. Vision Fire, its riparian flora recovered rapidly likely related to its 40 inches (1,000 mm) per year annual rainfall. Over half its length is low-gradient, supporting extensive willow (Salix spp.).

== Recreation ==
Muddy Hollow Creek can be reached via a mildly strenuous, 5.5-mile loop that crosses rolling grassland and small hills, along the Muddy Hollow Road, then Glenbrook Trail, then Estero Trail and finally the Muddy Hollow Trail.

== See also ==
- List of watercourses in the San Francisco Bay Area
- Estero de Limantour State Marine Reserve & Drakes Estero State Marine Conservation Area
