= Glenbrook Creek (California) =

Stream in California

- Location of the mouth of Glenbrook Creek in California

Location
- Country: United States
- State: California
- Region: Marin County, California

Physical characteristics
- Source: Point Reyes Hill, on Inverness Ridge
  - coordinates: 38°05′0.7″N 122°52′14.7″W
  - elevation: 1,229 ft (375 m)
- Mouth: Estero de Limantour
  - coordinates: 38°02′2.6″N 122°53′35″W
  - elevation: 3 ft (0.91 m)

Glenbrook Creek is a 4.8-mile-long (7.7 km) south-by-southwest-flowing stream in northern California. It is a tributary to Estero de Limantour within Point Reyes National Seashore's Phillip Burton Wilderness in west Marin County, California. From Estero de Limantour, its waters flow into Drakes Bay and the Pacific Ocean.

== History ==
Glenbrook Creek is named for Glenbrook Ranch, an historic, former 800-acre dairy farm constructed in 1884 within the Phillip Burton Wilderness of the Point Reyes National Seashore. It was established by lawyer and politician James McMillan Shafter, and eventually ownership passed along to Dr. Millard Ottinger in 1961, who used it as a hunting reserve until selling to the National Park Service in 1971. The remaining house and calf barn were torn down by the Park Service soon after.

== Watershed and Course ==
Glenbrook Creek begins on the western slope of Inverness Ridge at about 1,229 feet (375 m) on Point Reyes Hill. on Inverness Ridge. It receives a couple small unnamed tributaries as it descends to Estero de Limantour.

== Ecology ==
In a 2007 culvert replacement project, California giant salamander (Dicamptodon ensatus) were found in an amphibian survey, as were ensatina (Ensatina eschscholtzii), rough-skinned newt (Taricha granulosa), Pacific tree frog (Pseudacris regilla), garter snake (Thamnophis spp.) and federally threatened California red-legged frog (Rana draytonii).

Over half its length is low-gradient, supporting extensive willow (Salix spp.).

== Recreation ==
Glenbrook Creek can be reached via a mildly strenuous, 5.5-mile loop that crosses rolling grassland and small hills, along the Muddy Hollow Road, then Glenbrook Trail, then Estero Trail and finally the Muddy Hollow Trail.

== See also ==
- List of watercourses in the San Francisco Bay Area
