= Point Reyes National Seashore =

Park preserve in California, United States

- IUCN category V (protected landscape/seascape)
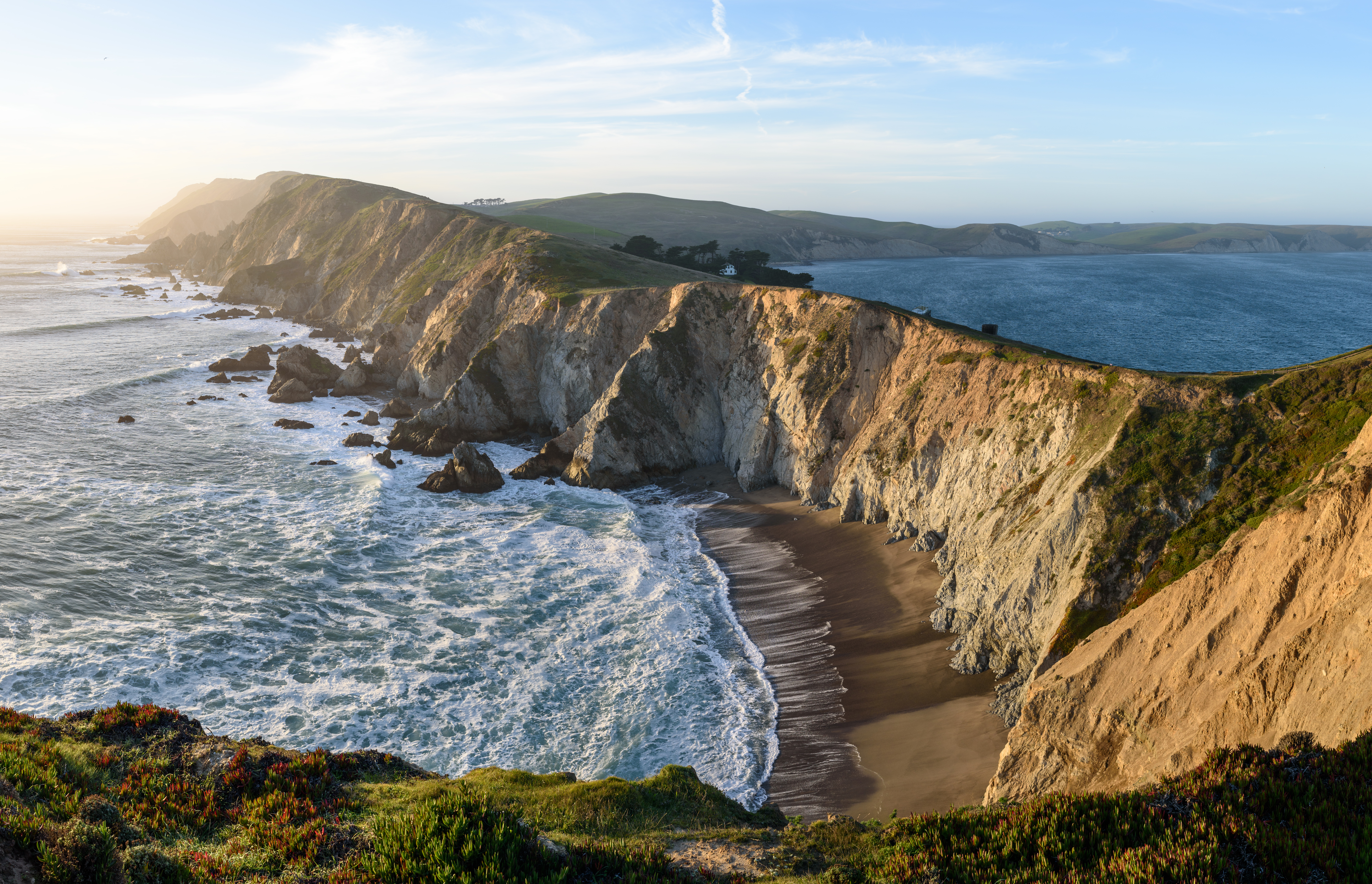
- Headlands of the Point Reyes Peninsula from Chimney Rock, looking north
- Interactive map of Point Reyes National Seashore
- Location: Marin County, California, United States
- Nearest city: Point Reyes Station, California
- Coordinates: 38°4′N 122°53′W
- Area: 71,028 acres (287.44 km^{2})
- Established: September 13, 1962
- Visitors: 2,336,202 (in 2022)
- Governing body: National Park Service
- Website: Point Reyes National Seashore

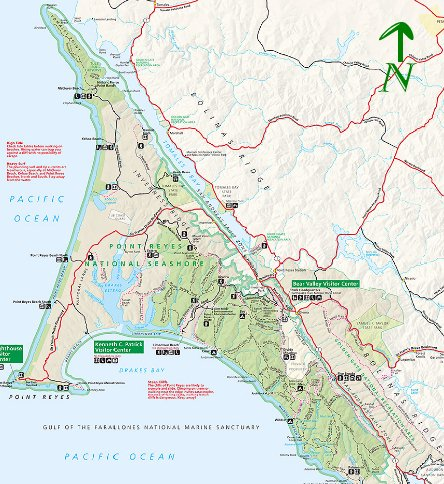
Map of Point Reyes National Seashore, with the wilderness area in green

Point Reyes National Seashore is a 71,028-acre (287.44 km^{2}) park preserve located on the Point Reyes Peninsula in Marin County, California. As a national seashore, it is maintained by the US National Park Service as an important nature preserve. No other U.S. national park south of Alaska hosts breeding hoofed megafauna (elk) and marine megafauna (elephant and other seals). Some existing agricultural uses are allowed to continue within the park. Clem Miller, a US Congressman from Marin County, wrote and introduced the bill for the establishment of Point Reyes National Seashore in 1962 to protect the peninsula from development which was proposed at the time for the slopes above Drake's Bay. About half of the national seashore is protected as wilderness.

== History ==
The Native American Coast Miwok lived in the area for thousands of years, in villages of seventy five to several hundred people. The Coast Miwok developed an economy of hunting, gathering, and fishing, utilizing the seashore as a source of year-round food such as crab, clams, and oysters. Drip nets and woven surf nets were used for fishing, while bow and arrows were used for hunting deer, quail, and rabbits.

Francis Drake and his crew aboard the Golden Hind were likely the first Europeans to discover what is today Point Reyes National Park, when they likely camped in the area in 1579. Drake claimed the land for Elizabeth I before setting sail to complete his circumnavigation of the world. Spanish ships making the voyage between Manila and Acapulco likely passed by Point Reyes during the late 1500s, including the captain Sebastião Rodrigues Soromenho in 1595, whose ship was wrecked by a storm in Drakes Bay. On January 6, 1603, Captain Sebastián Vizcaíno sighted the headlands and named it Point of the Kings, or la Punta de los Reyes, in honor of Three Kings' Day.

Point Reyes was later part of Rancho Punta de los Reyes and Rancho Punta de los Reyes Sobrante. This land was later acquired by the brothers Oscar L. Shafter and James McMillan Shafter, whose heirs owned it until the early 1900s.

== Geography ==
The Point Reyes peninsula is a well defined area, geologically separated from the rest of Marin County and almost all of the continental United States by a rift zone of the San Andreas Fault. The northern half of the fault is sunk below sea level and forms Tomales Bay and the southern half lies along Olema Creek. The peninsula is part of the Salinian Block which rises as Inverness Ridge before dropping to the fault zone. East of the fault is the Franciscan Complex which has a different soil and flora composition.

Named creeks in the Seashore include on the inland side, Olema Creek which flows north to Tomales Bay and Pine Gulch Creek which flows south to Bolinas Lagoon, and on the oceanside from north to south: Schooner Creek and East Schooner Creek which feed into Schooner Bay then Drakes Estero, Home Ranch Creek which flows to Drakes Estero, Glenbrook Creek which flows to Estero de Limantour along with Muddy Hollow Creek, then Laguna Creek, Santa Maria Creek, Coast Creek, Alamere Creek, and Arroyo Hondo which all flow directly into the ocean. Alamere Creek ends in Alamere Falls, one of only two coastside waterfalls in California.

The small town of Point Reyes Station, while not located on the peninsula, provides most services to it. Some services are also available at Inverness on the west shore of Tomales Bay. The small town of Olema, about 3 miles (4.8 km) south of Point Reyes Station, serves as the gateway to the Seashore and its visitor center.

The peninsula includes wild coastal beaches and headlands, estuaries, and uplands. Parts of the park are private farms and ranches which have commercial cattle grazing. These were leased back when the park was purchased to continue these historic uses. Other parts are under the jurisdiction of other conservation authorities with the National Park Service providing signage and managing visitor impact on the entire peninsula and Tomales Bay. The Seashore also administers the parts of the Golden Gate National Recreation area, such as the Olema Valley, that are adjacent to the Seashore.

== Wildlife and ecology ==
Point Reyes National Seashore lies at the convergence of two marine ecological provinces (southern Oregonian and northern Californian) and harbors 45% of North America's bird species and 18% of California's plant species. The National Seashore's 100 miles (160 km) of coastline include estuaries, bays and lagoons which provide rich habitats including subtidal seagrasses, tidal mudflats and marshes that support a rich diversity of wildlife. There are at least 42 rare and endangered plants of the more than 850 plant species identified. Almost 40 species of land mammals plus a dozen marine mammals such as the harbor seal live or migrate through this area. Bird species counts are well over 400.

It is part of the Golden Gate Biosphere Network, recognized in the World Network of Biosphere Reserves.

=== Fauna ===
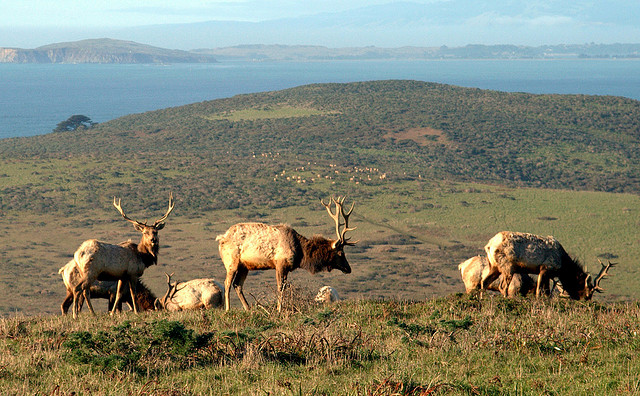
Tule Elk at Tomales Point

Until recently, the northernmost part of the peninsula, Tomales Point, was maintained as a reserve for tule elk (Cervus canadensis nannodes), a species historically native to the region. Although they had been completely extirpated from Point Reyes by the nineteenth century, in 1978, ten tule elk were reintroduced to Point Reyes from the San Luis National Wildlife Refuge near Los Banos. By 2009, the population climbed to over 440 elk at Tomales Point's 2,600 acres (1,100 ha) of coastal scrub and grasslands. In 1999, 100 elk from Tomales Point were moved to the Limantour wilderness area of the Seashore and above Drakes Beach to Ranch A, as that ranch's long-term lease expired and was not renewed. The drought in 2012–2015 was also a threat to the elk confined north of the fence on Tomales Point, with nearly half the elk there dying from lack of water. In 2012 there were 540 elk, then only 357 in 2013, and by 2014 only 286. In August and September 2020, drought and wildfires again threaten the Tomales Point elk, leading some conservationists to illegally bring water to the elk north of the fence. The Park Service began a public review and comment period in 2023 on a proposal remove of the tule elk fence with a final decision expected in the summer of 2024. In December, 2024 the Tomales Point fence was breached by the National Park Service, allowing the confined elk herds to roam freely through the park. Then, in January, 2025 a deal brokered by The Nature Conservancy led to a buy-out of most of the peninsula's ranchers, reducing the number of cattle from about 10,000 to 200 over the next 1.5 years, and returning most of the park to wilderness status.

The preserve is also very rich in raptors and shorebirds. The western snowy plover that nests here is considered "threatened" under the Endangered Species Act.

The Point Reyes Lighthouse attracts whale-watchers looking for the gray whale migrating south in mid-January and north in mid-March.

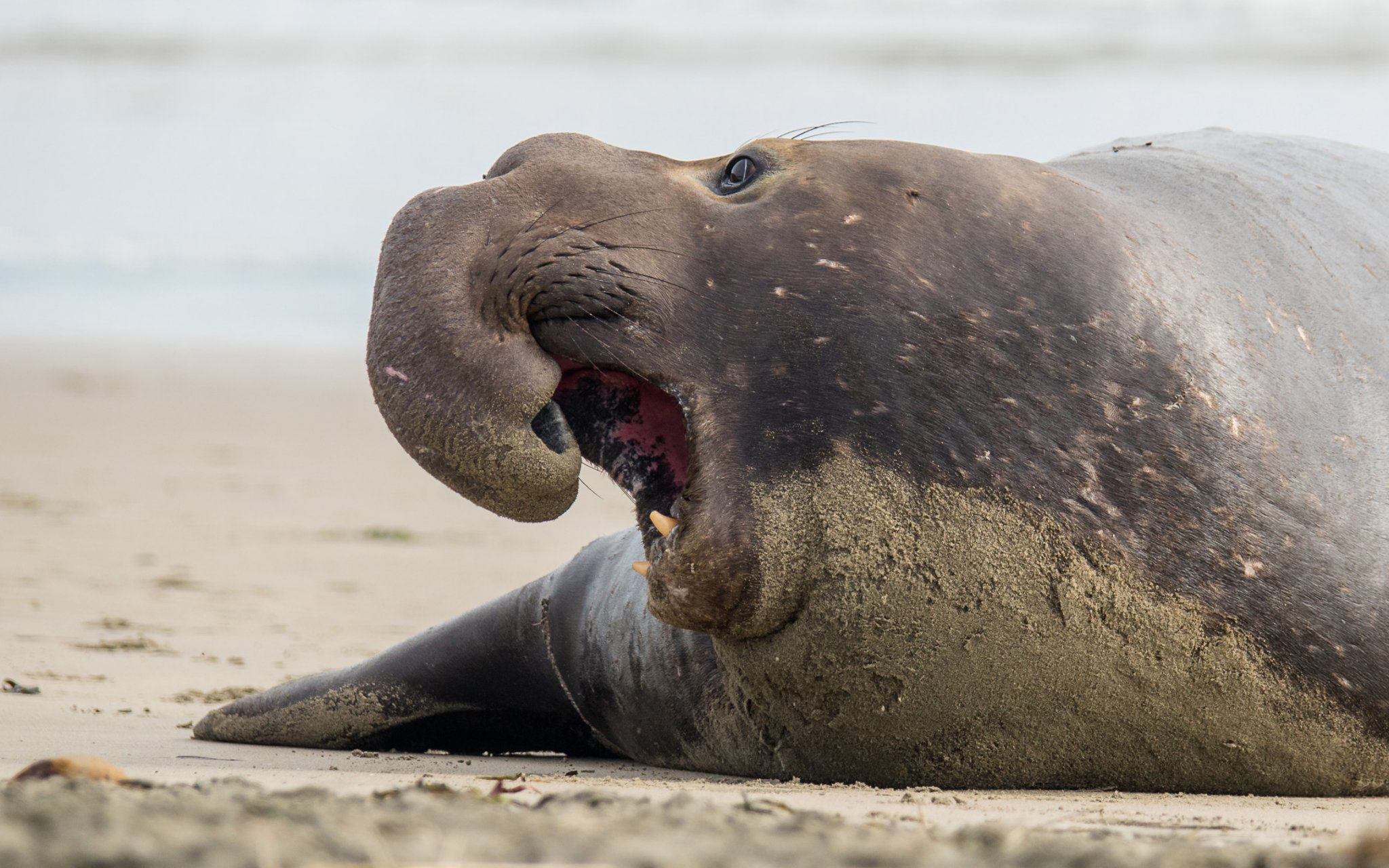
Elephant seal at Drakes Bay

When Elephant seals (Mirounga angustirostris) established a rookery in 1981, Point Reyes National Seashore became the only U.S. national park south of Alaska with breeding ungulate and pinniped megafauna (defining megafauna as > 500 pounds). The first elephant seal breeding colony was established at Chimney Beach, which is protected by 100-foot (30 m) cliffs, although the first documented pup was born at Point Reyes in 1976. In January 2019, during the federal government shutdown, park rangers were not working and the seals had pups on Drakes Beach and its parking lot. Small-group tours to view the seals from the edge of the parking lot began the following month after the shutdown ended. Docents help keep the public safe during the winter months as the colony continues to grow each year.

=== Flora ===
Point Reyes lies within the California interior chaparral and woodlands ecoregion. The Point Reyes area has more than 50 species of rare, threatened or endangered plants. Perennial wildflowers include the yellow larkspur (Delphinium luteum), federally listed as endangered, and state listed as rare since 1979. It has yellow flowers that bloom from March through May, grows in plant communities of coastal scrub, and is extremely poisonous (major toxicity class 1). Rare grasses include the endemic Sonoma shortawn foxtail (Alopecurus aequalis var. sonomensis) in the family Poaceae, federally listed as endangered since 1997. The California Native Plant Society lists this subspecies population as seriously endangered, and that more taxonomic information is needed.

In his book The Natural History of the Point Reyes Peninsula, Jules Evens identifies several plant communities. One of the most prominent is the Coastal Douglas-fir (Pseudotsuga menziesii) forest, which includes Coast live oak, Tanoak, and California bay and reaches across the southern half of Inverness Ridge toward Bolinas Lagoon. Unlogged parts of this Douglas-fir forest contain trees over 300 years old and up to 6 feet (1.8 m) in diameter. But despite these large, old trees, the forest may nevertheless be a result of European settlement. The Coast Miwok people who once lived in the area set frequent fires to clear brush and increase game animal populations, and early explorers' accounts describe the hills as bare and grassy. But as the Native American settlements were replaced by European ones from the seventeenth century onward, the forests expanded as fire frequency decreased, resulting in the forests we see today.

The Bishop pine (Pinus muricata) forest is found on slopes in the northern half of the park. Many of these trees growing in thick swaths came from seeds released after the 1995 Mt. Vision fire. The bishop pines of the Phillip Burton Wilderness are considered an intermediate between the northern variety (Pinus muricata v. borealis) and the southern (Pinus muricata v. muricata). The Monterey cypress (Callitropsis macrocarpa), a closed-cone conifer, is also present.

Salt, brackish, and freshwater marshlands are found adjacent to Drakes Estero and Abbotts Lagoon. The other communities identified by Evens are the coastal strand, dominated by European beach grass (Ammophila arenaria), ice plant (Carprobrotus edulis, also called sea fig or Hottentot fig), sea rocket (Cakile maritima) and other species that thrive on the immediate coast; northern coastal prairie, found on a narrow strip just inland from the coastal strand that includes some native grasses; coastal rangeland, the area still grazed by the cattle from the peninsula's remaining working ranches; northern coastal scrub, dominated by coyote bush (Baccharis pilularis); and the intertidal and subtidal plant communities.

Point Reyes is home to the only known population of the endangered Sonoma spineflower, Chorizanthe valida.

=== Cattle ranches ===
The park has 28,000 acres (11,000 ha) of dairy and beef cattle ranching. Extremely high levels of fecal coliform bacteria (Escherichia coli) concentrations have been documented in streams adjacent to existing dairy operations. Cattle manure spreading areas are correlated with the increased presence of invasive and noxious weed species. Tomales Bay, Drakes Estero and Abbotts Lagoon are all affected by E. coli discharges from cattle operations in rainy winter months. A joint inspection in 2022 by the Marin County Environmental Health Services and the National Park Service found the ranches were discharging raw sewage either through leaks or missing septic systems.

== Climate ==
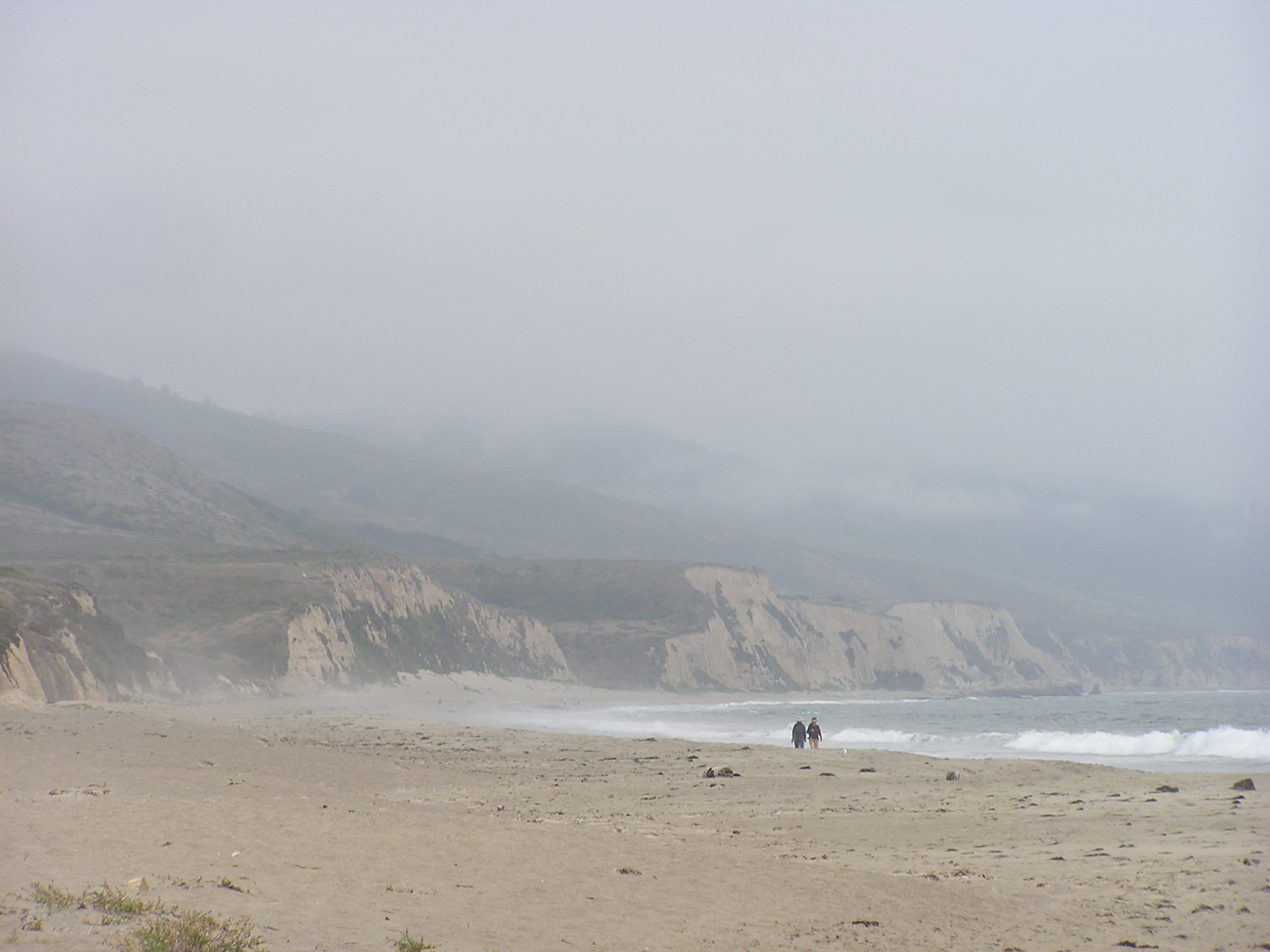
Fog rolling in from the Pacific at Point Reyes National Seashore.

Point Reyes National Seashore

Climate chart (precipitation, max. and min. temperature)
J	F	M	A	M	J	J	A	S	O	N	D
112 12 4	109 13 4	121 16 6	51 16 6	1 19 8	10 19 10	1 21 11	4 23 11	17 24 11	31 21 10	133 15 7	178 12 4
- █ Average max. and min. temperatures in °C
- █ Precipitation totals in mm
Imperial conversion
J	F	M	A	M	J	J	A	S	O	N	D
4.4 54 39	4.3 55 39	4.8 61 43	2 61 43	0 66 46	0.4 66 50	0 70 52	0.2 73 52	0.7 75 52	1.2 70 50	5.2 59 45	7 54 39
- █ Average max. and min. temperatures in °F
- █ Precipitation totals in inches

== Landmarks and facilities ==
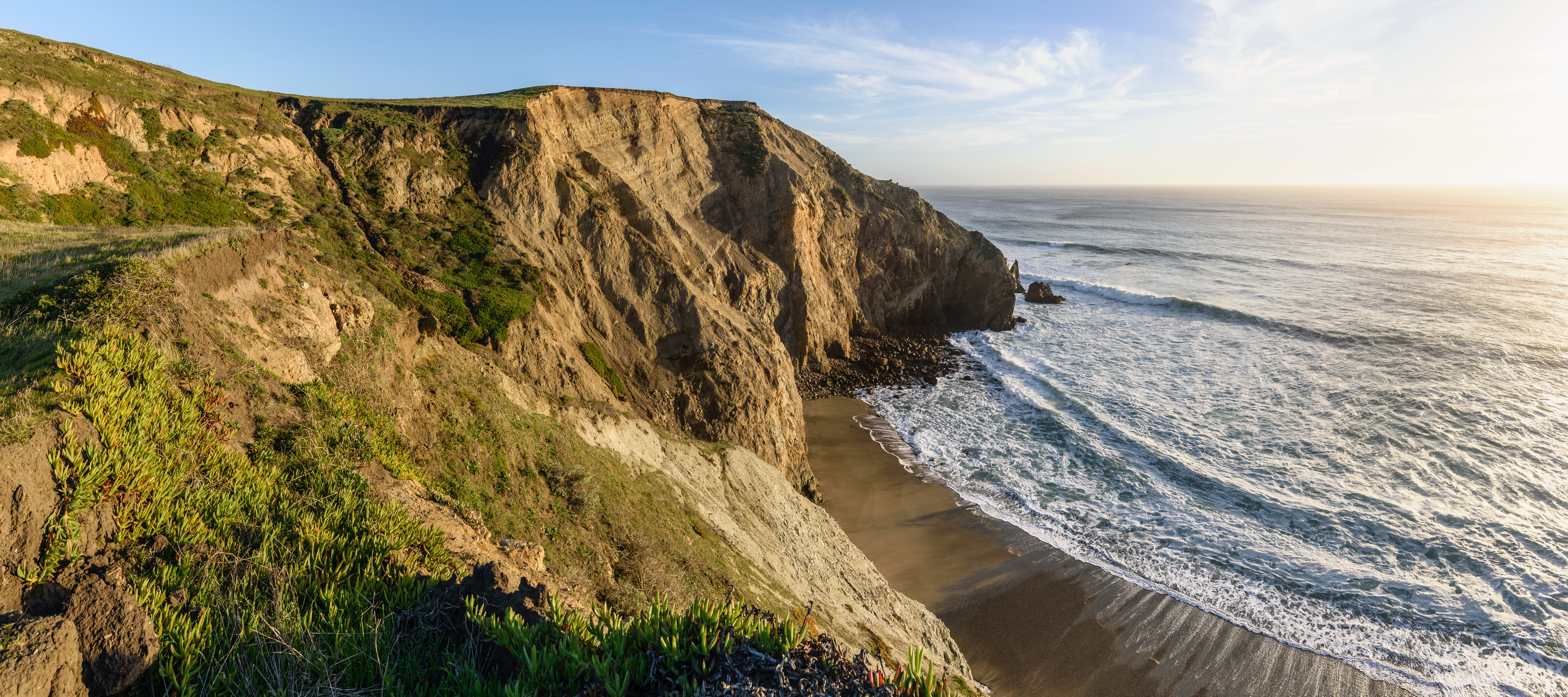
View to the southeast from Chimney Rock Trail

The Point Reyes Lifeboat Station is a National Historic Landmark. It is the last remaining example of a rail-launched lifeboat station that was common on the Pacific coast.

Nova Albion, Francis Drake's 1579 campsite; Sebastião Rodrigues Soromenho's 1595 wreck; and fifteen associated Native American sites are included in the Drakes Bay Historic and Archaeological District National Historic Landmark. This encompasses 5,965 acres (24.14 km^{2}) along the coast of Drakes Bay.

Kule Loklo, a re-created Coast Miwok village, is a short walk from the visitor center.

The historic KPH radio receiving station is located towards the lighthouse, at the end of a cypress tree tunnel.

Lairds Landing was the site of a wharf on the southwest shore of Tomales Bay. It was named after ranchers, Charles and George Laird, who leased the site in 1858 to transport supplies and produce across the bay. The location was settled by the Felix family around 1861, a family of Filipino and Miwok heritage. After the descendants of the Felix family left in 1955, the land was zoned for development, then made part of the Point Reyes National Seashore, before becoming home to artist Clayton Lewis. In 2015, structures built by the Felix family were placed on the National Register of Historic Places.

The Point Reyes National Seashore attracts 2.5 million visitors annually. Hostelling International USA (part of Hostelling International) maintains a 45-bed youth hostel at the Seashore.

The Point Reyes National Seashore Association, formed in 1964, collaborates with the Seashore on maintenance, restoration and educational projects.

=== Wilderness ===
More than 30,000 acres (120 km^{2}) of the Point Reyes National Seashore are designated as the Phillip Burton Wilderness, named in honor of California Congressman Phillip Burton, who wrote the legislation creating the Golden Gate National Recreation Area and was instrumental in helping to pass the California Wilderness Act of 1984. The US Congress passed legislation (Public Law 94-544) in 1976 that created the Point Reyes Wilderness, and in 1985, Congress, in recognition of Burton's dedication to wilderness preservation, renamed the wilderness after him (P.L. 99-68). It is one of only three designated wilderness areas along the California coast, the others being the King Range Wilderness and the Rocks and Islands Wilderness.

There are three separate sections:

The southeastern area protects the Inverness Ridge down to a long coastline and is the largest unit. Within this area are forests of Douglas fir and California buckeye, coastal foothills, terraces, caves, beaches, several small inland lakes and the high point of Mount Wittenberg. The four trailcamps are in this section, with Wildcat and Coast camps located near shore, and Sky and Glen camps inland. Each camp has a different number of individual sites, with 52 sites total and four group sites.

The central section, which is separated from the southeastern unit by Limantour Road, protects the crest of the Inverness Ridge, the east shore of Estero de Limantour and the Limantour Spit. An endemic (restricted to one area) and rare coastal pine known as the Bishop pine grows here.

The north segment includes the Tomales Point area, which is an open grassland peninsula that separates the Pacific Ocean to the west from the Tomales Bay, a submerged valley, on the east. A reserve for the reintroduced tule elk is in this section. Although there are no trailcamps, boat-in camping is allowed on Tomales Bay.

=== Hiking ===
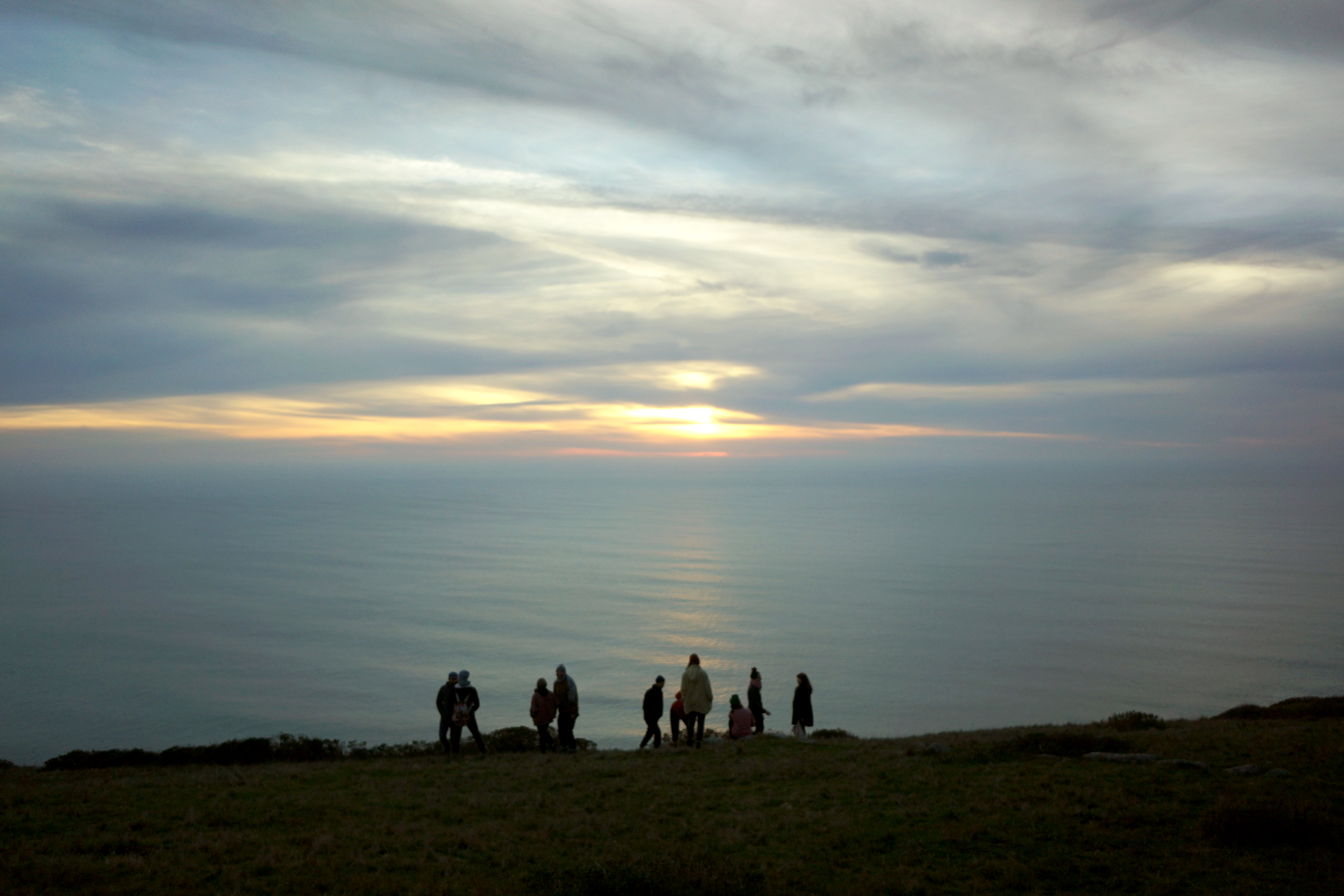
A group of people gathered to watch the sunset at Point Reyes National Seashore.

Point Reyes has a system of about 150 miles of hiking trails for day hiking and backpacking. Bear Valley Trail is the most popular hike in the park. It travels mostly streamside through a shaded, fern-laden canyon, breaking out at Divide Meadow before heading downward to the coast, where it emerges at Arch Rock. A portion of Arch Rock collapsed on March 21, 2015, killing one person.

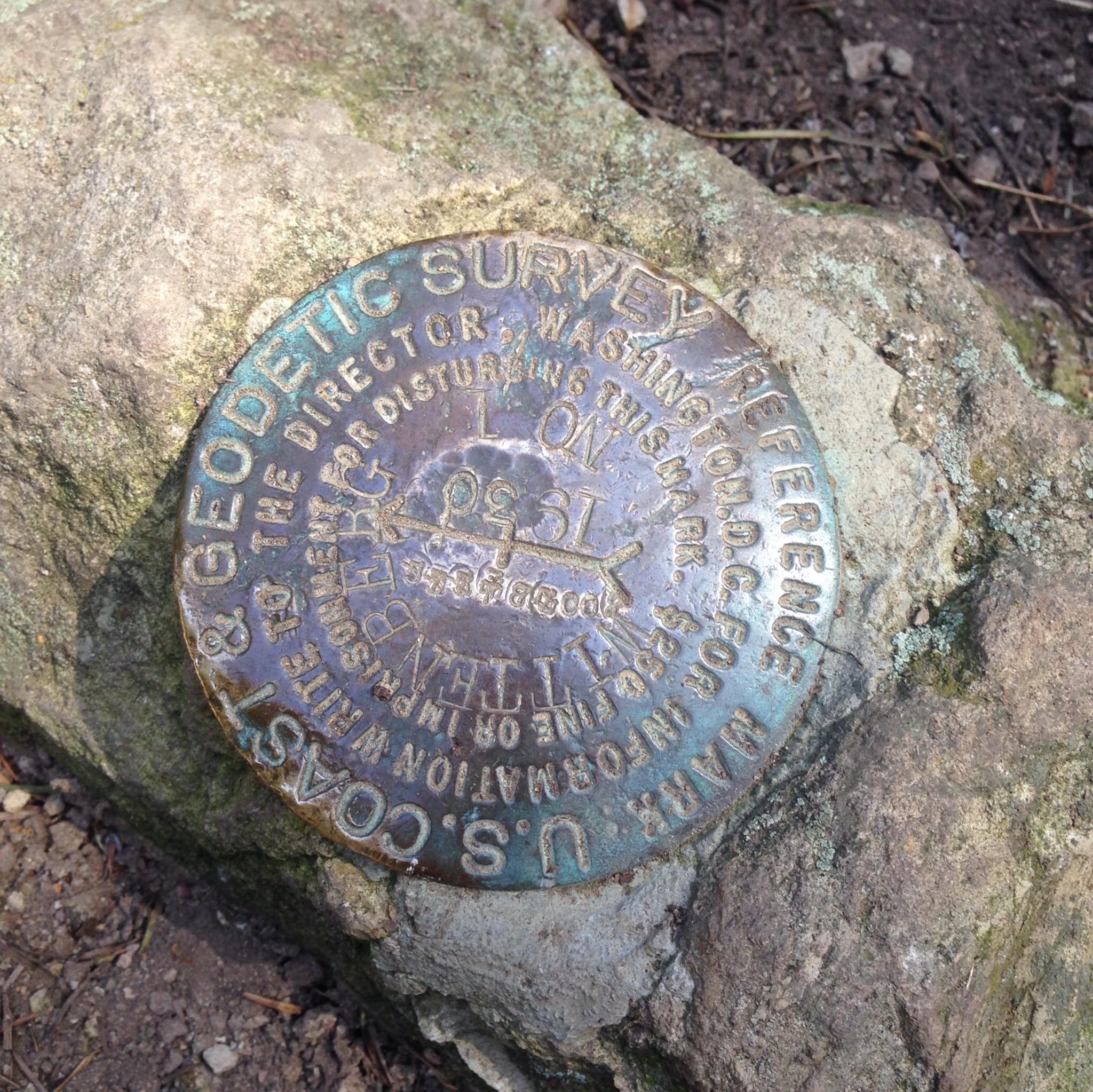
A United States Coast and Geodetic Survey marker at the peak of Mount Wittenberg, the highest point in the park.

Three trails connecting from the west with the Bear Valley trail head upward toward Mount Wittenberg, at 1,407 feet (429 m), the highest point in the park. The Earthquake Trail, a 0.6-mile (0.97 km) loop that runs over the San Andreas Fault. The trail provides descriptions of the fault and the surrounding geology, and features a fence that was pulled 18 feet (5.5 m) apart during the 1906 San Francisco earthquake.

At the western end of the Point Reyes Peninsula is the historic Point Reyes Lighthouse, reached by descending 308 steps. Unlike many lighthouses, that were built high so the light could be seen by ships far out to sea, the Point Reyes lighthouse was built low to get the light below the fog that is so prevalent in the area. Nearby is the short Chimney Rock hike, which is noted for its spring wildflower displays.

Point Reyes offers several beach walks. Limantour Spit winds up on a narrow sandy beach, from which Drakes Beach can be glimpsed across Drakes Bay. North Beach and South Beach are often windswept and wave-pounded. Ocean vistas from higher ground can be seen from the Tomales Point Trail and, to the south, from the Palomarin trailhead at the park's southern entrance outside the town of Bolinas. All of the park's beaches were listed as the cleanest in the state in 2010.

For backpackers, Point Reyes has four hike-in campgrounds, Glen camp, Coast camp, Wildcat camp, and Sky camp, available by reservation.

Point Reyes is a terminus of the American Discovery Trail which is the only transcontinental trail in the United States.

=== Marine Protected Areas ===
Point Reyes State Marine Reserve & Point Reyes State Marine Conservation Area, Estero de Limantour State Marine Reserve & Drakes Estero State Marine Conservation Area and Duxbury Reef State Marine Conservation Area adjoin Point Reyes National Seashore. These marine protected areas help conserve ocean wildlife and marine ecosystems.

=== Oyster farm ===
Point Reyes National Shoreline 2018

A large oyster farm was located in Drakes Estero until, under court order, it closed down at end of 2014. Court appeals to keep the operation in place were dropped in December, 2014.

The farm was purchased by the National Park Service in 1972, and the agency issued a permit to allow the previous owner to continue operations for 40 years. The business was sold to a new owner in 2004, the Drakes Bay Oyster Company, who was informed by the NPS at the time of purchase that their permit to operate would not be renewed beyond the November 30, 2012 expiration date. A federal law enacted in 2009 authorized, but did not require, Interior Secretary Ken Salazar to renew the permit. The NPS and conservation groups viewed the farm as an inappropriate and environmentally-insensitive use of the estero, which was designated a "potential wilderness area" by Congress. The farm's supporters argued that it was not ecologically harmful and was important to the local economy.

On November 29, 2012, Salazar announced that he would not renew the permit, citing the original intent of the Point Reyes Wilderness Act to designate the area as wilderness upon the removal of the oyster farm. Salazar visited the farm the previous week and later personally phoned the farm's owner to give him the news.

The oyster farm closure was challenged in U.S. District Court on January 25, 2013. The challenge was rejected by a federal court judge, who ruled that the law gave Salazar unfettered discretion to approve or deny a renewal of the permit. The California Coastal Commission voted on February 7, 2013 to unanimously approve cease and desist and restoration orders for violations of the California Coastal Act. The United States Court of Appeals for the Ninth Circuit rejected an appeal of the district court's decision, ruling on Sept. 3, 2013 that the oyster farm's owner had not shown a likelihood of success on the merits because Salazar had acted within his discretion in denying the permit. An attempt to have the appeals court rehear the case was rejected on January 14, 2014 and a petition to the United States Supreme Court was denied on June 30, 2014. The oyster farm closed its on site retail operation on July 31, 2014. However, controversy continued over the condition of the estero sea floor and the ongoing off shore operations. Another lawsuit challenging the closure itself was rejected in September 2014.

The work to remove the offshore racks and onshore buildings was completed in May 2017; 1,700 tonnes (1,700 long tons; 1,900 short tons) of debris had been hauled away. The estero is part of the Phillip Burton Wilderness.

== Gallery ==
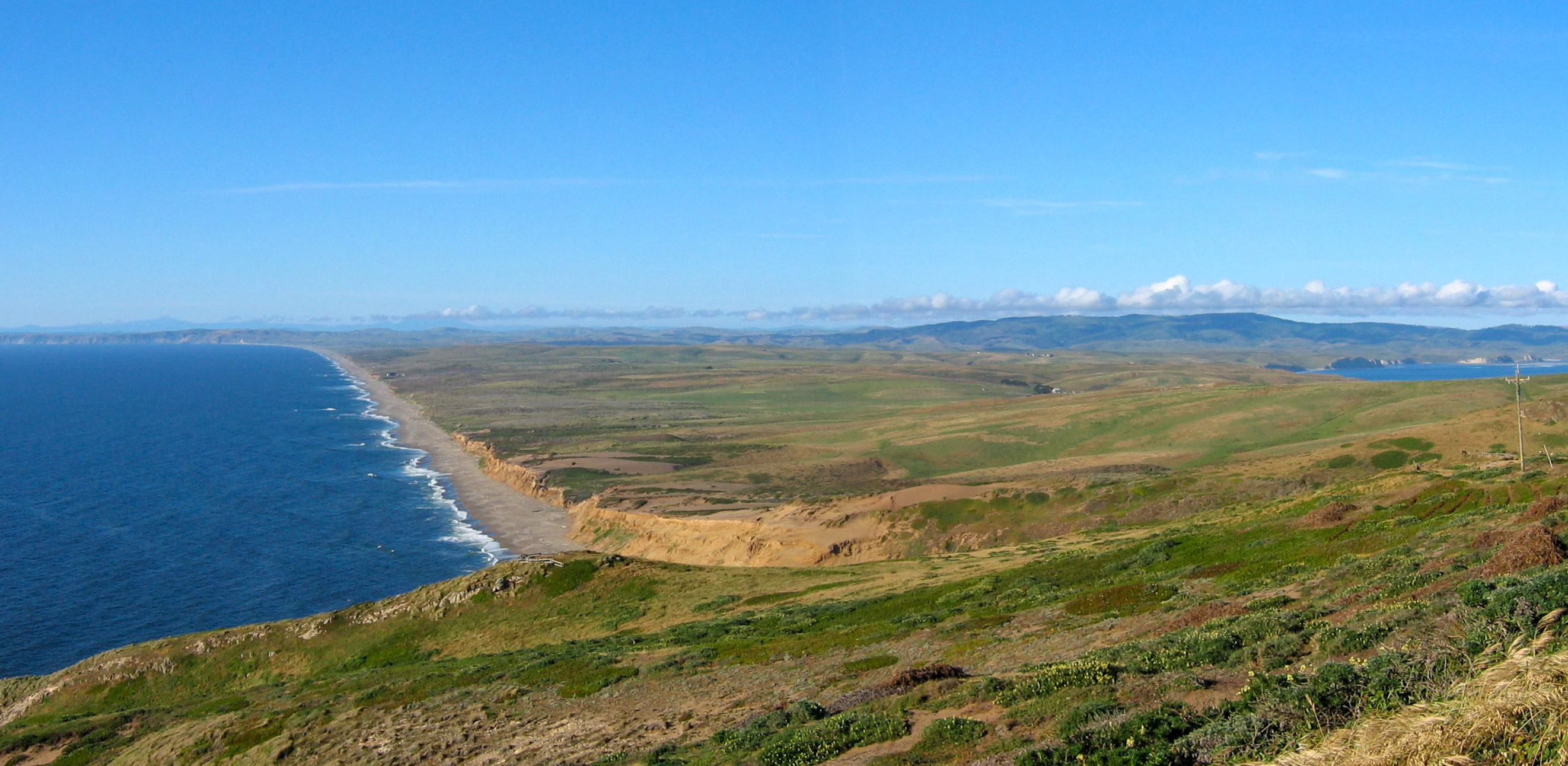
Point Reyes Beach from the Lighthouse Visitor Center

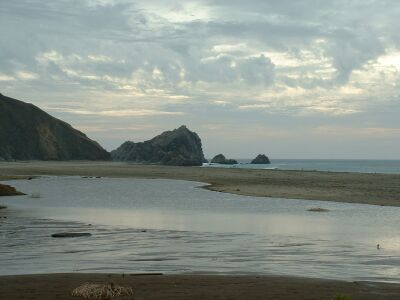
McClure's Beach

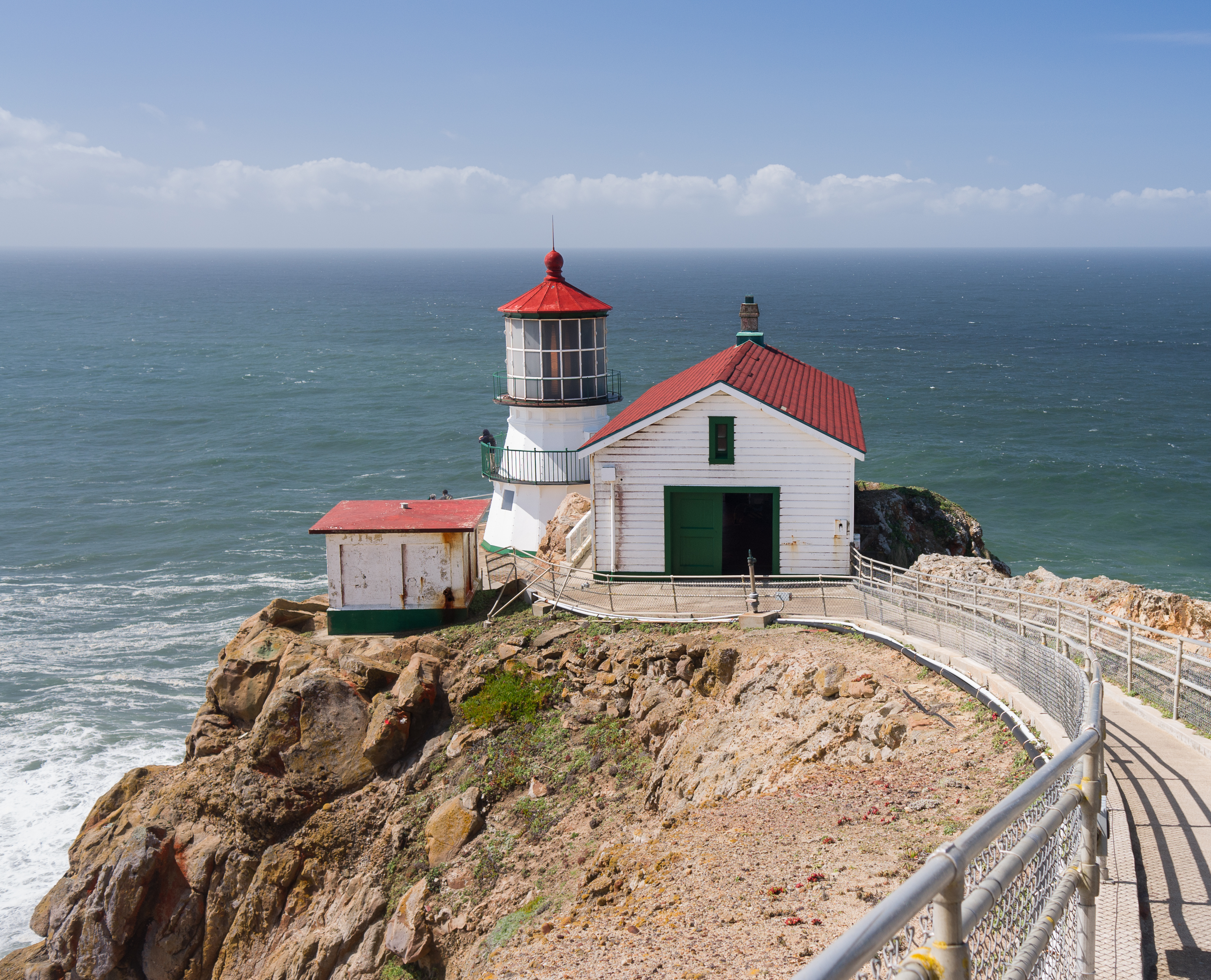
Point Reyes Lighthouse

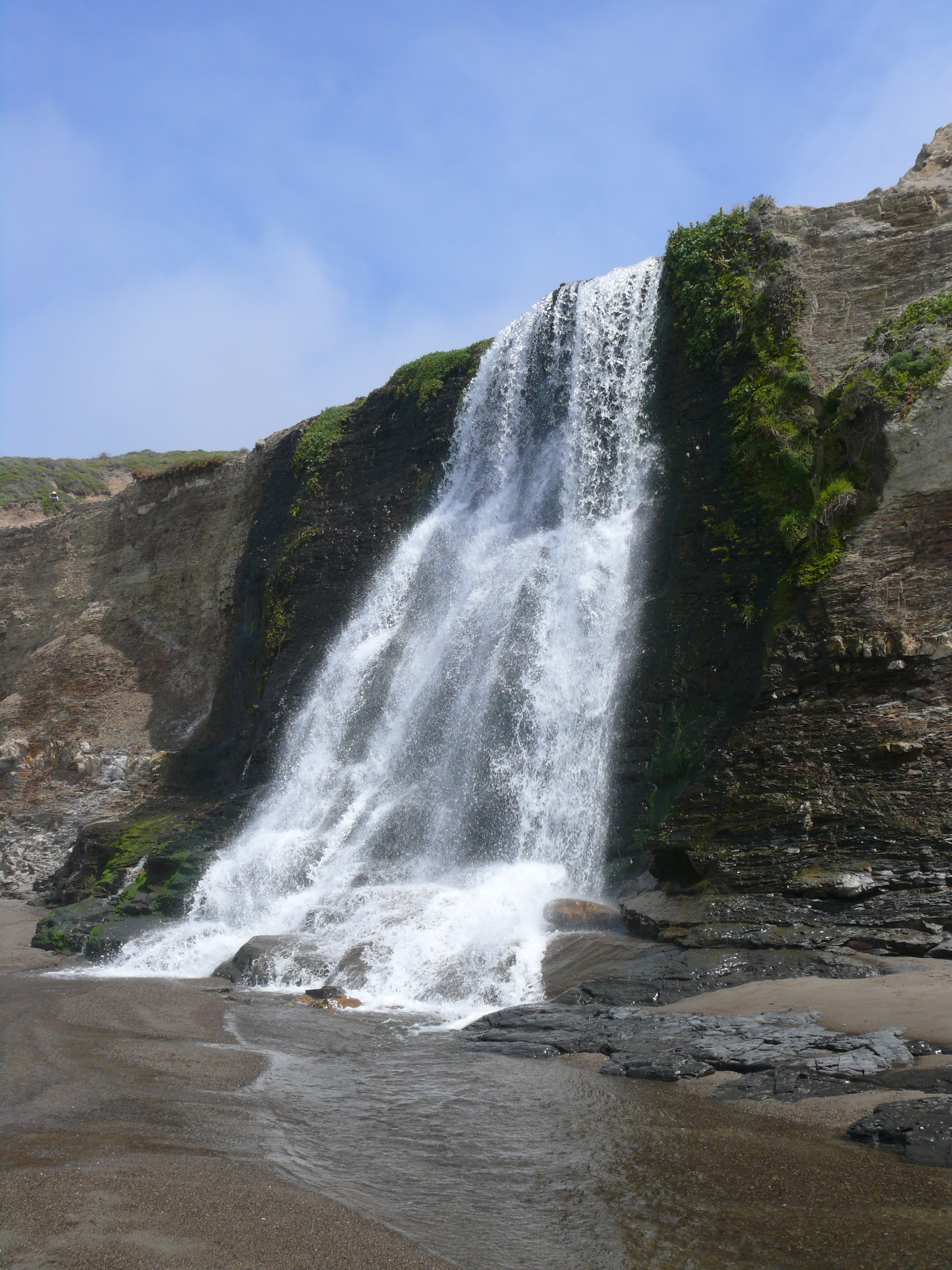
Alamere Falls

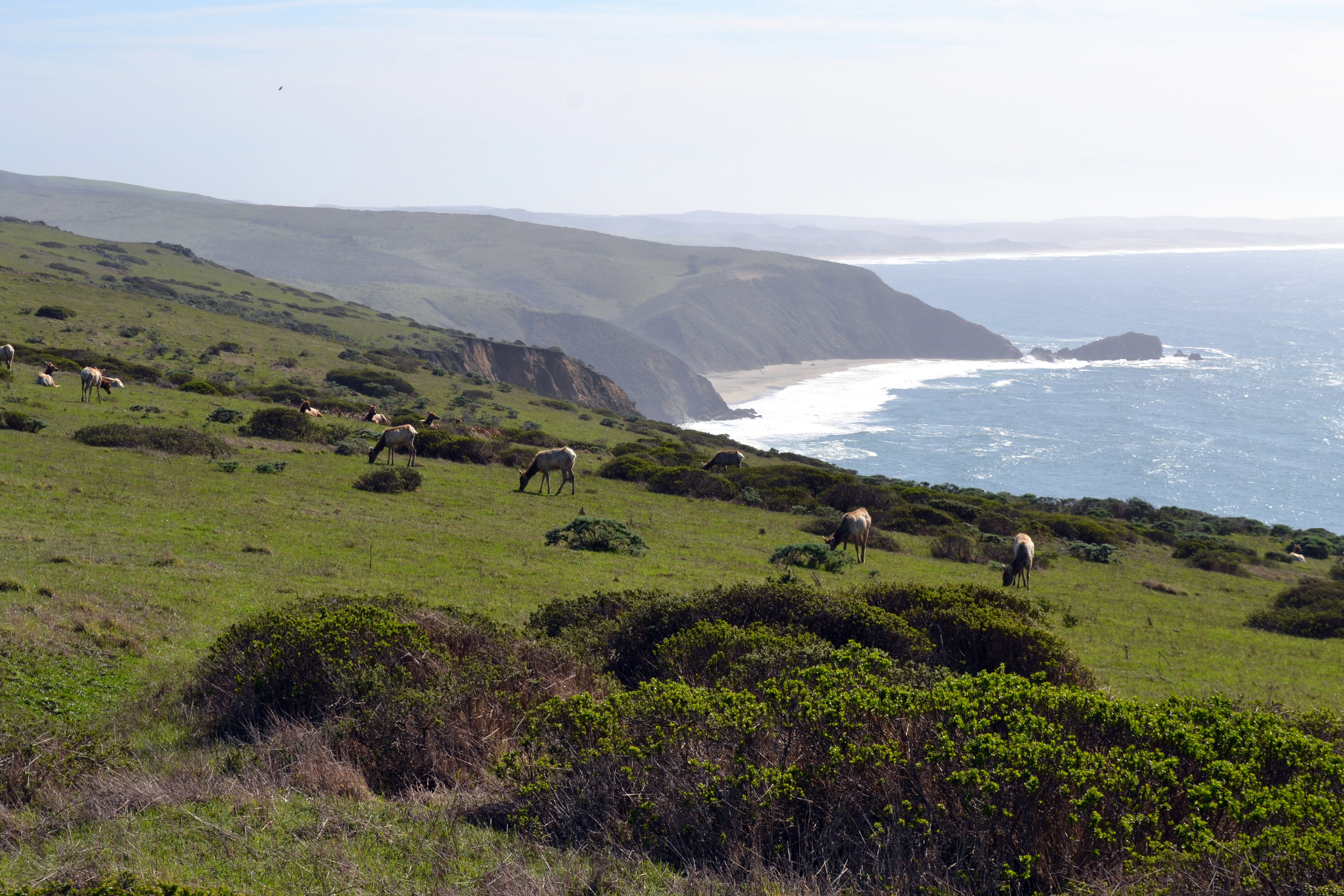
Tule elk on Tomales Point Trail

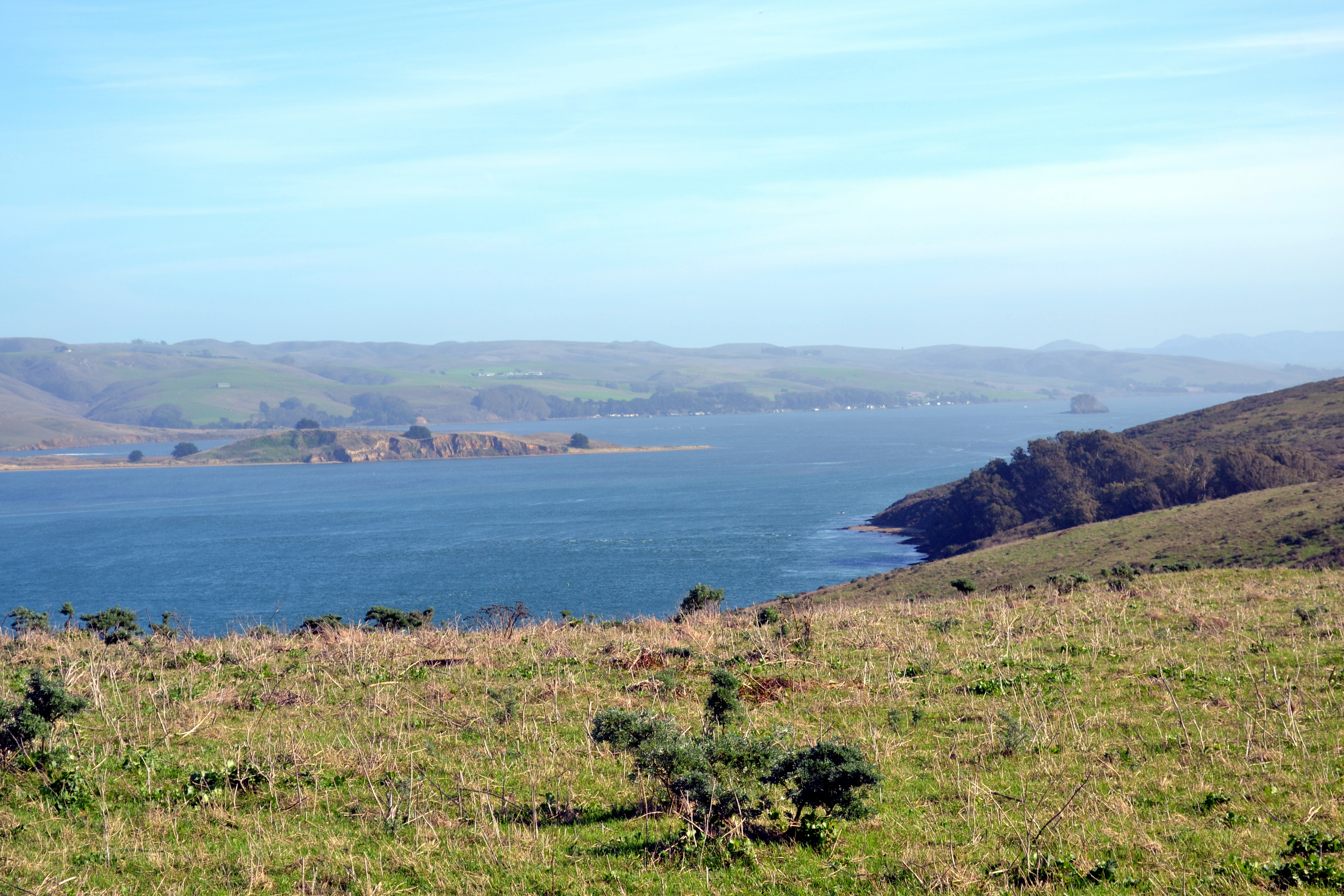
Tomales Bay on the Eastern side

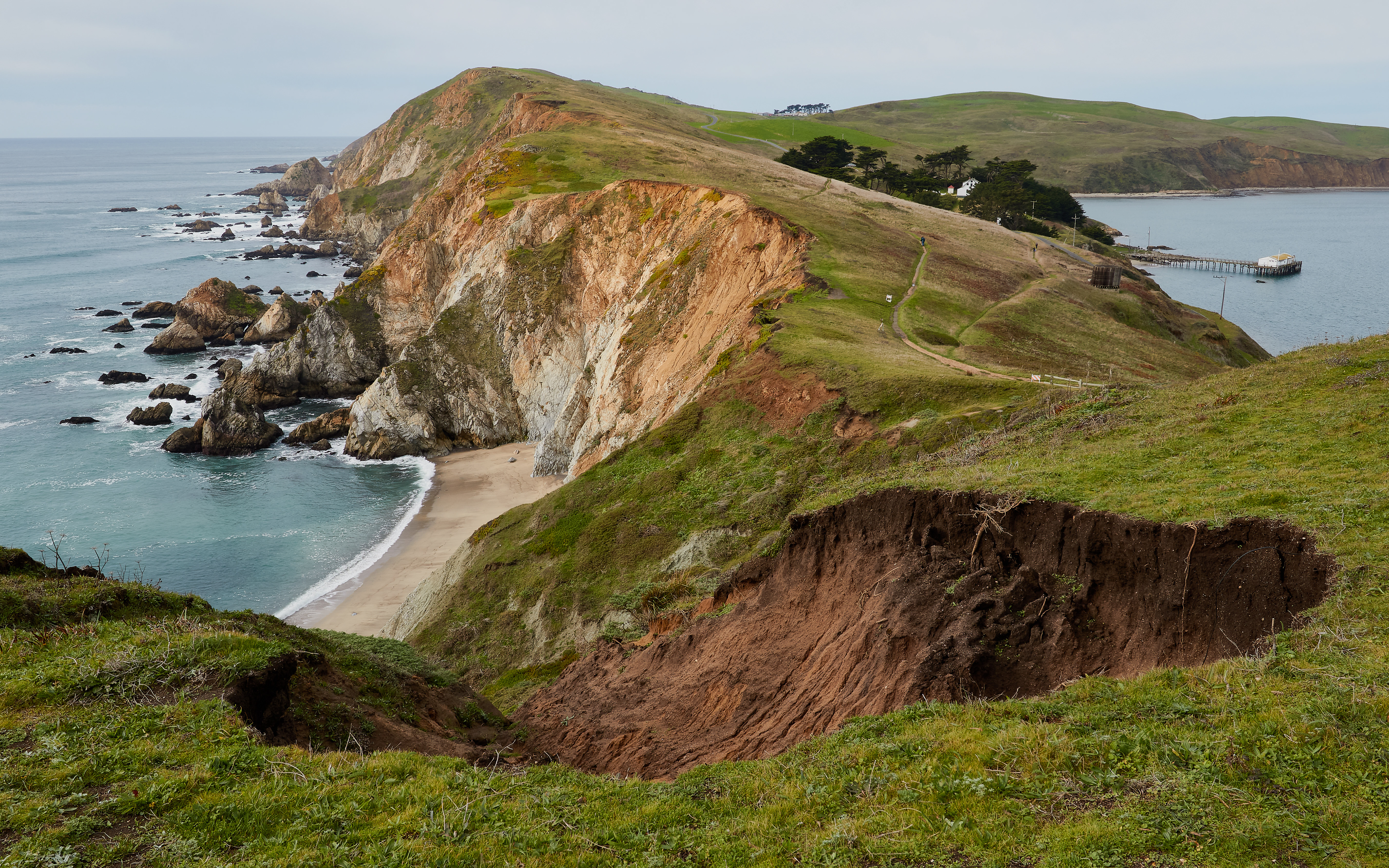
Coastline as seen from Chimney Rock

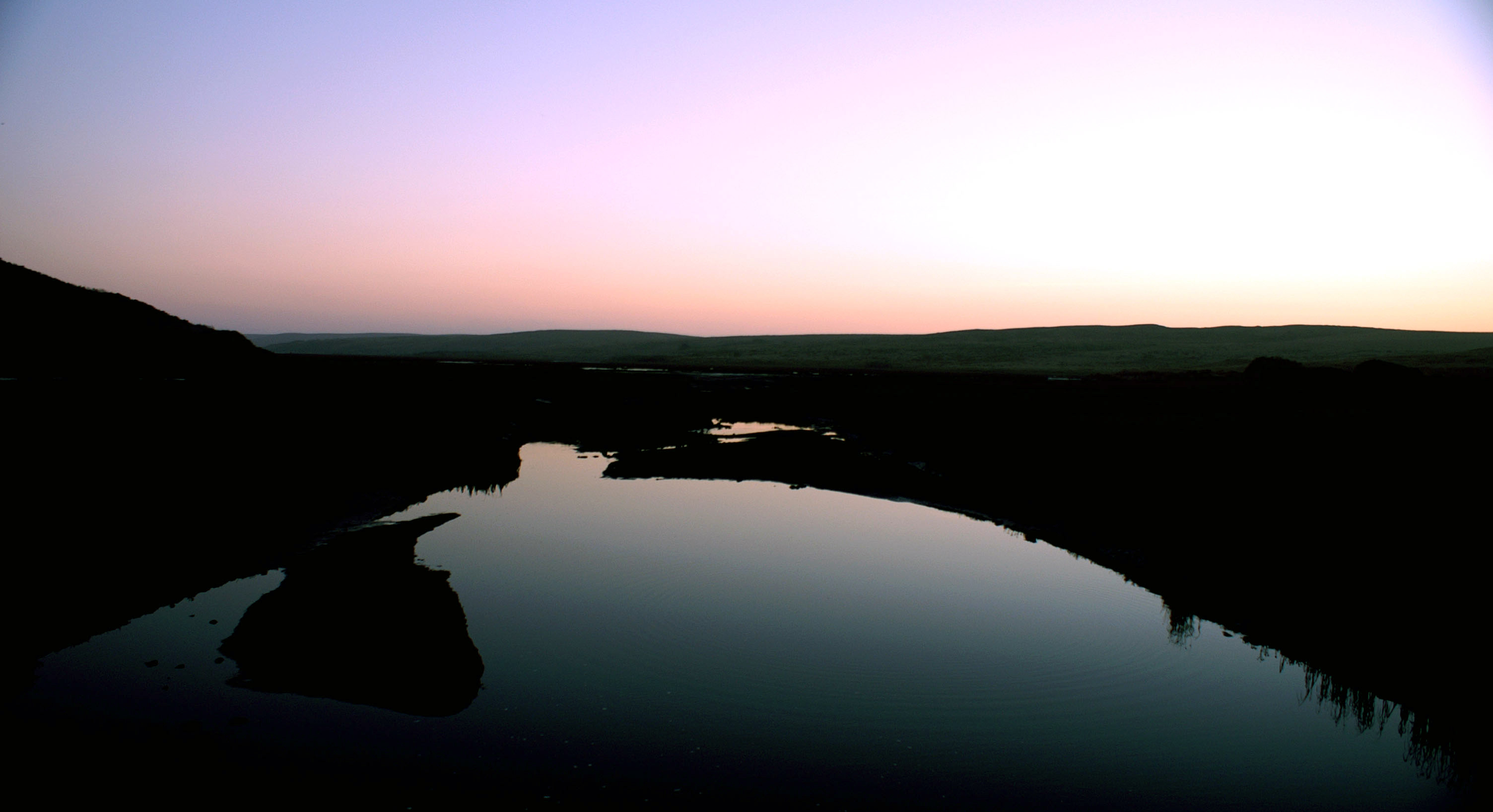
Point Reyes Marsh at dusk

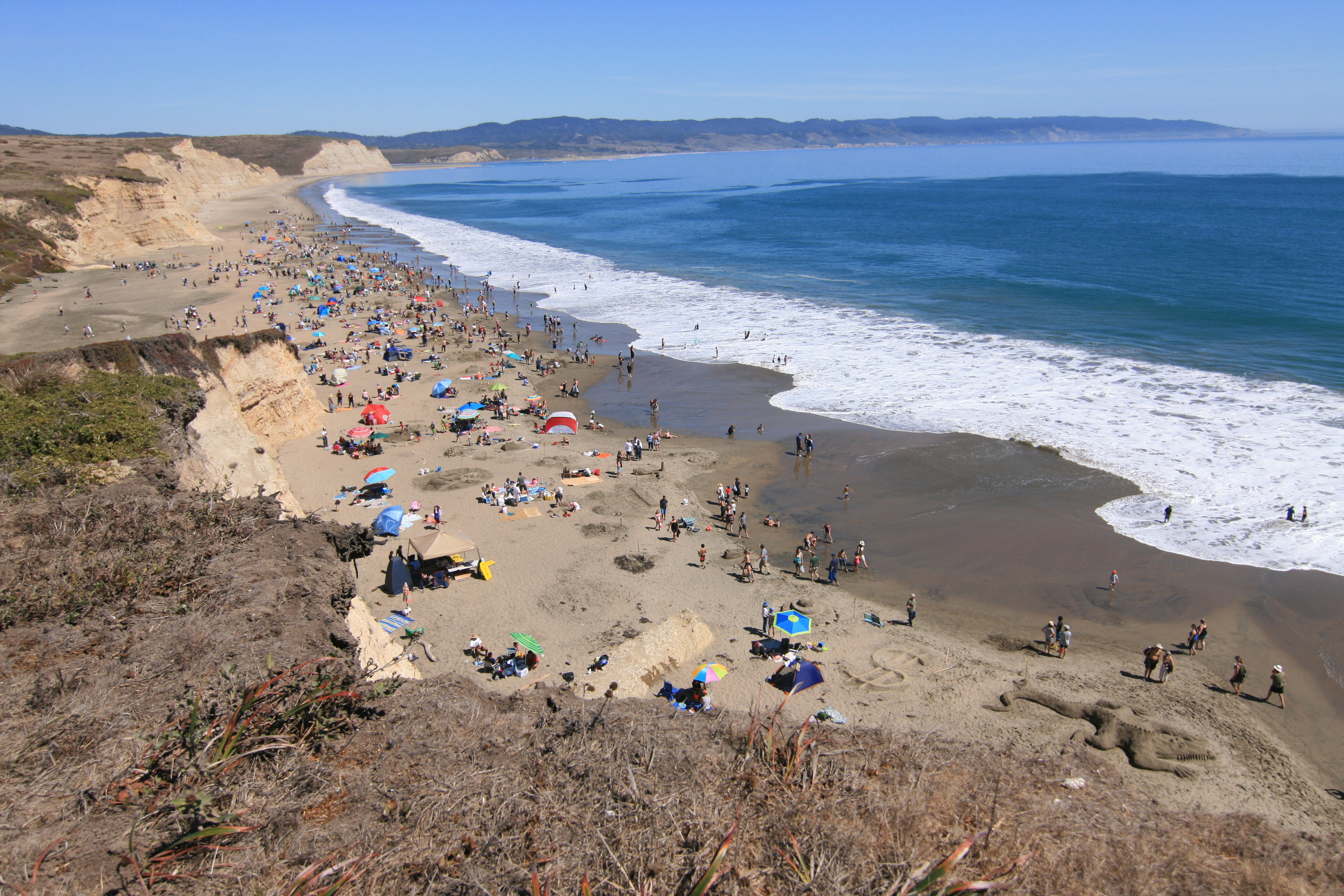
Drakes Beach during the 2015 Annual Sand Sculpture Contest.

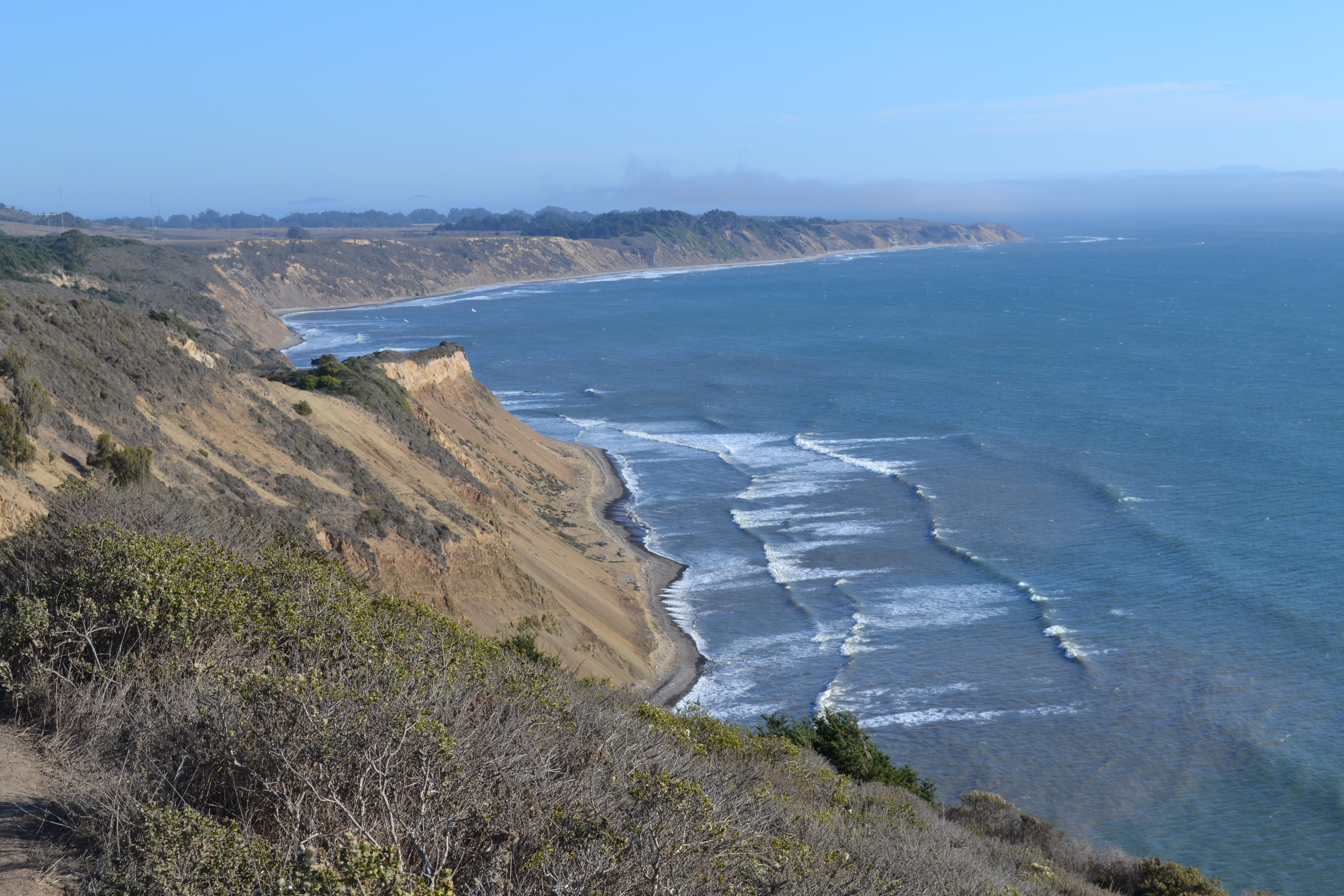
Wildcat Beach

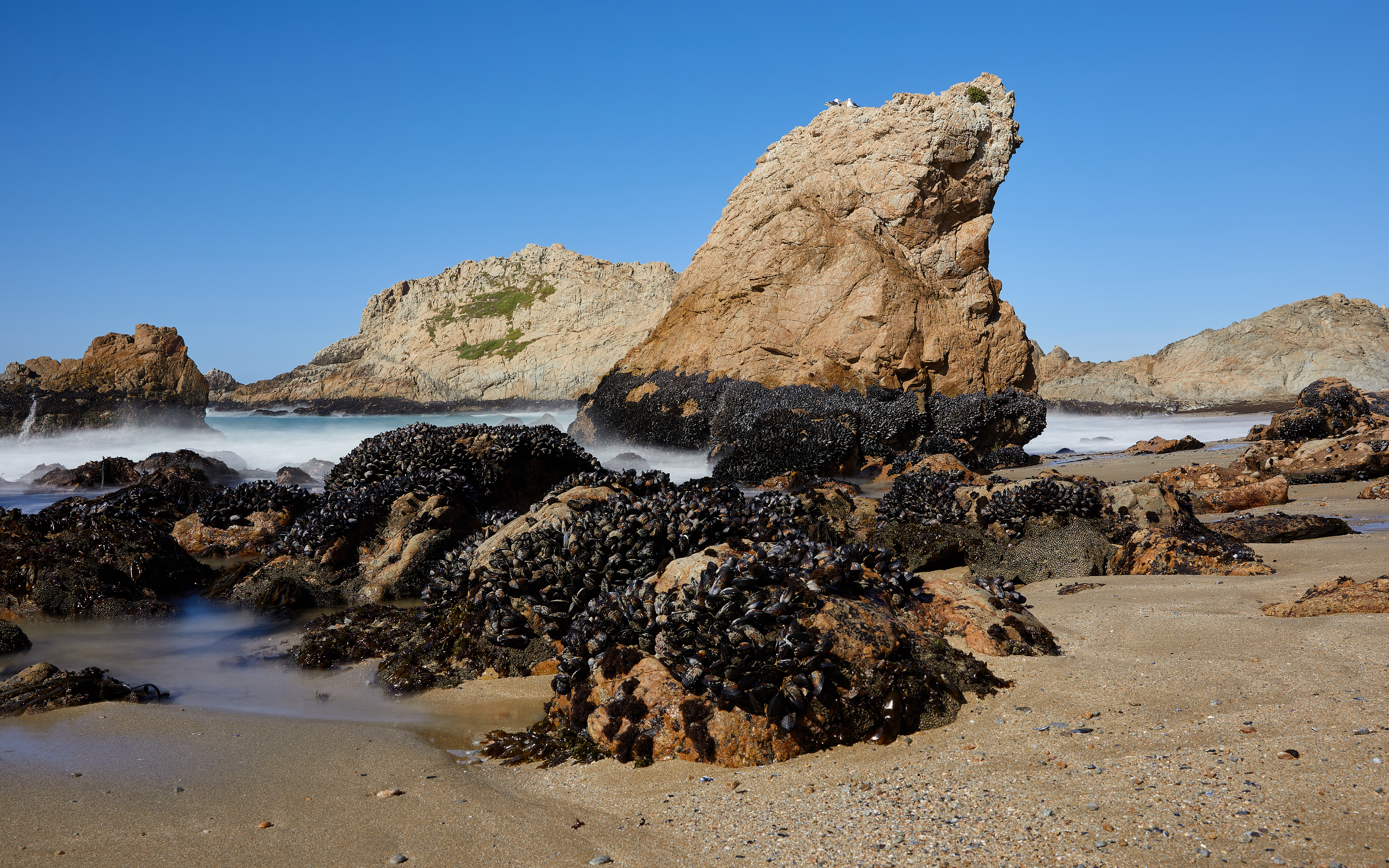
McClures Beach

Photo of Point Reyes National Seashore taken for the National Park Service's Mission 66 initiative, ca. 1966.

== See also ==
- List of beaches in California
- List of California state parks
- Camp Hydle
- Bertha Felix Campigli
