= Estero de Limantour State Marine Reserve & Drakes Estero State Marine Conservation Area =

Marine conservation area in California, United States

Estero de Limantour State Marine Reserve (SMR) and Drakes Estero State Marine Conservation Area (SMCA) are two adjoining marine protected areas along the Point Reyes National Seashore in Marin County on California’s north central coast. These marine protected areas cover a combined 4.04 square miles (10.5 km^{2}), with 1.49 square miles (3.9 km^{2}) in the SMR and 2.55 square miles (6.6 km^{2}) in the SMCA. Drakes Estero SMCA prohibits the take of all living marine resources from Drakes Estero except the recreational take of clams and formerly the commercial aquaculture of shellfish pursuant to a disputed state water bottom lease and permit, which has been the subject of ongoing legal proceedings since 2012, when the lease was allowed to expire.

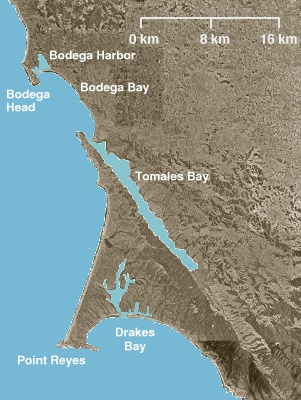

== History ==
Estero de Limantour State Marine Reserve SMR and Drakes Estero State Marine Conservation Area SMCA are two of 22 marine protected areas adopted by the California Department of Fish and Game in August 2009 during the second phase of the Marine Life Protection Act Initiative. The MLPAI is a collaborative public process to create a statewide network of protected areas along California’s coastline.

The north central coast’s new marine protected areas were designed by local divers, fishermen, conservationists and scientists who comprised the North Central Coast Regional Stakeholder Group. Their job was to design a network of protected areas that would preserve sensitive sea life and habitats while enhancing recreation, study and education opportunities.

The north central coast marine protected areas took effect May 1, 2010.

== Geography and natural features ==
Estero de Limantour SMR and Drakes Estero SMCA are two adjoining marine protected areas along the Point Reyes National Seashore in Marin County on California’s north central coast. Estero de Limantour SMR is contiguous to Point Reyes state marine reserve. Point Reyes is a spectacular and biologically diverse peninsula which has been designated a National Seashore.

Its freshwater tributaries include (west to east) a couple unnamed creeks, Glenbrook Creek, and Muddy Hollow Creek.

Estero de Limantour SMR consists of waters below the mean high tide line within Estero de Limantour and Drakes Estero southward of a line connecting 38°2.66′N 122°56.89′W with 38°2.66′N 122°56.15′W and northward of a line connecting 38°1.783′N 122°55.286′W with 38°1.954′N 122°56.451′W.

Drakes Estero SMCA includes the waters below the mean high tide line within Drakes Estero northward of a line connecting 38°2.66′N 122°56.89′W with 38°2.66′N 122°56.15′W.

== Habitat and wildlife ==
Estero de Limantour and Drakes Estero serve as nurseries for Dungeness crab and various fish species, as well as seal pupping areas and haul-out sites for marine mammals and major foraging areas for leopard sharks, bat rays, and many bird species. Estero de Limantour SMR and Drakes Estero SMCA protect complex estuarine habitats, including eelgrass beds and mudflat ecosystems, and reduce disturbances to major mainland seabird colonies and elephant seal rookeries.

== Recreation and nearby attractions ==
Through a haze of salty fog, visitors can see, hear, smell and even feel the thunderous ocean breakers washing over long sandy beaches and crashing into rocky cliffs. Point Reyes National Seashore covers over 100 square miles (260 km^{2}) and includes 33,300 acres (135 km^{2}) of coastal wilderness area. The undeveloped coastline stretches for 80 miles (130 km). Extensive recreational activities include hiking, biking, kayaking, camping and wildlife viewing. There are three visitor centers and extensive ranger-led programs.

Estero de Limantour SMR prohibits the take of all living marine resources. Drakes Estero SMCA prohibits the take of all living marine resources except the recreational take of clams and the commercial aquaculture of shellfish pursuant to a valid state water bottom lease and permit. However, California’s marine protected areas encourage recreational and educational uses of the ocean. Activities such as kayaking, diving, snorkeling, and swimming are allowed unless otherwise restricted.

== Scientific monitoring ==
As specified by the Marine Life Protection Act, select marine protected areas along California’s central coast are being monitored by scientists to track their effectiveness and learn more about ocean health. Similar studies in marine protected areas located off of the Santa Barbara Channel Islands have already detected gradual improvements in fish size and number.
