= Rancho Punta de los Reyes Sobrante =

Mexican land grant in California, US

Coordinates: 38.020°N 122.990°W

Rancho Punta de los Reyes Sobrante was a 48,189-acre (195.01 km^{2}) Mexican land grant in present-day western Marin County, California, given by Governor Manuel Micheltorena in 1843 to Antonio Maria Osio. The name means "Leftover of Point Reyes Ranch". It comprised much of what is now western Marin County and the Point Reyes National Seashore.

== History ==
=== Antonio Maria Osio ===
Antonio Maria Osio (1800–1878) was born in and died in Mexico. Osio married Dolores Argüello, sister of Luis Antonio Argüello, the first governor of California. In 1838, Osio settled in Monterey. In 1839, Governor Alvarado granted Osio, Angel Island, on the condition that Osio would set aside part of the island for a fort. However, Osio never took up residence there. In 1839, Osio bought Rancho Punta de los Reyes from Joseph Snook (1798–1848), and sought about acquiring the adjacent eleven square league Rancho Punta de los Reyes Sobrante, which Governor Micheltorena granted him in 1843. Osio was also the grantee of the six square league Rancho Aguas Frias given by Governor Micheltorena in 1844.

After Osio was granted Rancho Punta de los Reyes Sobrante, he built a few structures, but didn't spend much time there. He moved his family to San Rafael. In 1843, when Rafael Garcia moved onto part of the neighboring Rancho Punta de los Reyes of James Richard Berry; Berry, in turn, moved west onto a portion of Osio's Rancho Punta de los Reyes Sobrante. Though Osio protested this incursion onto his land with the authorities in Monterey, nothing ever came of it.

In 1846, during the Mexican–American War, Osio fled to Honolulu, where he lived until 1849. After returning to Monterey in 1850, Osio sold his Rancho Punta de los Reyes Sobrante to Andrew Randall, who also bought Rancho Punta de los Reyes, and Rancho Aguas Frias. Osio returned to Mexico in 1852. With his second wife, Narcisa Florencia Soto, he had thirteen children. He died in San José del Cabo in 1878.

=== Andrew Randall ===
Andrew Randall (1819–1856), a native of Rhode Island, came to California on the U.S.S. Portsmouth in 1846. Randall was a geologist with medical training. He founded, and was elected chairman of the California Academy of Sciences. In addition to Rancho Punta de los Reyes Sobrante and Rancho Punta de los Reyes in Marin County, Randall was the claimant for Rancho Cañada de la Segunda and Rancho San Lorenzo in Monterey County; and Rancho Aguas Frias in Butte County – a little over 110,000 acres (445 km^{2}). However he had stretched his credit to the limit, and Randall could not or would not pay immediately. Joseph Hetherington a creditor undertook to force payment by hounding him on every occasion with insults and threats. Hetherington fatally shot Randall in a San Francisco hotel on July 24, 1856, and the Committee of Vigilance hanged Hetherington July 29, 1856.

With the cession of California to the United States following the Mexican–American War, the 1848 Treaty of Guadalupe Hidalgo provided that the land grants would be honored. As required by the Land Act of 1851, a claim for Rancho Punta de los Reyes Sobrante was filed with the Public Land Commission in 1852, and the grant was patented to Andrew Randall in 1860.

=== Shafter family ===
In 1857, the complex real estate litigation resulted in the law firm of Oscar L. Shafter and James McMillan Shafter winning a victory for their client of 75,000 acres of farm land at Point Reyes in Marin County. The client sold the property to the Shafters. They leased it to dairy farmers who provided milk and butter to an ever-growing San Francisco and prospered. The Shafter families owned most of Point Reyes from 1857 to 1919, when the land was sold in parcels.

=== National Park Service ===
The National Park Service acquired the land on Point Reyes to form the Point Reyes National Seashore.

== See also ==
- Ranchos of California
- List of Ranchos of California
- Golden Gate National Recreation Area
