= Rancho Punta de los Reyes (Randall) =

Mexican land grant in California

Coordinates: 38.090°N 122.870°W

Rancho Punta de los Reyes was a 8,878-acre (35.93 km^{2}) Mexican land grant in present-day western Marin County, California, given in 1836 by Governor Nicolás Gutiérrez to James Richard Berry and re-granted in 1838 by Governor Juan B. Alvarado to Joseph Snook. The grant extended along the west side of Tomales Bay and encompassed present day Inverness.

== History ==
James Richard Berry (died 1847), an Irishman and a colonel in the Mexican army came to California from Mexico. In 1836, Governor Gutierriez, granted him the eight square league Rancho Punta de los Reyes. In 1838, Berry sold the two square league portion along the western shore of Tomales Bay (known as the "Inverness Pocket") of the Rancho Punta de los Reyes grant to Joseph Snook (1798–1848), grantee of Rancho San Bernardo. The sale of the grant was illegal under Mexican law. After receiving advice, Snook 'denounced' this tract of Berry's grant, and got it re-granted to him by Governor Alvarado in 1839.

"Snook officially denounced the land he had unofficially bought from Berry. Berry officially acceded to the denouncement of the land he had unofficially sold to Snook. In June 1839, the land was officially regranted to Snook, and Berry officially retained the remainder of his land, with Snook's money unofficially in his pocket."

Soon after, in 1839, Snook sold Rancho Punta de los Reyes to Antonio Osio of Rancho Punta de los Reyes Sobrante, and returned to San Diego County with his wife.

Osio sold Rancho Punta de los Reyes to Andrew Randall. Andrew Randall (1819–1856), a native of Rhode Island, came to California in 1849 as the newly appointed customs inspector for Monterey. Randall was an entrepreneur with training as a geologist. He founded, and was elected chairman of the California Academy of Sciences. In addition to Rancho Punta de los Reyes and Rancho Punta de los Reyes Sobrante in Marin County, Randall was the claimant for Rancho Cañada de la Segunda and Rancho San Lorenzo in Monterey County; and Rancho Aguas Frias in Butte County - a little over 110,000 acres (445 km^{2}). However he had stretched his credit to the limit, and Randall could not or would not pay immediately. Joseph Hetherington a creditor undertook to force payment by hounding him on every occasion with insults and threats. Hetherington fatally shot Randall in a San Francisco hotel on July 24, 1856, and the Committee of Vigilance hanged Hetherington July 29, 1856.

With the cession of California to the United States following the Mexican-American War, the 1848 Treaty of Guadalupe Hidalgo provided that the land grants would be honored. As required by the Land Act of 1851, a claim for Rancho Punta de los Reyes was filed with the Public Land Commission in 1853, and the grant was patented to Andrew Randall in 1860.

== See also ==
- Ranchos of California
- List of Ranchos of California
- Golden Gate National Recreation Area
