= Rancho Esquon =

Coordinates: 39.630°N 121.750°W

Rancho Esquon (also called Neal's Rancho) was a 22,194-acre (89.82 km^{2}) Mexican land grant in present-day Butte County, California given in 1844 by Governor Manuel Micheltorena to Samuel Neal. The grant, located south of present-day Chico, extended on the east bank of Butte Creek, and encompassed present-day Durham, Esquon, Gridley, and Nelson. Rancho Aguas Frias was directly across Butte Creek.

== History ==
Samuel Neal (1816–1859), a native of Pennsylvania and a blacksmith by trade, came to California with John C. Frémont's second expedition in 1844. After working for John Sutter briefly, Samuel Neal was awarded the five square league Rancho Esquon grant in 1844. In 1849, Neal mined gold on the Feather River at a location that became known as Neals Diggins. For six years David Dutton worked with Neal on the Rancho.

With the cession of California to the United States following the Mexican-American War, the 1848 Treaty of Guadalupe Hidalgo provided that the land grants would be honored. As required by the Land Act of 1851, a claim for Rancho Esquon was filed with the Public Land Commission in 1852, and the grant was patented to Samuel Neal in 1860.

Upon his early death in 1859, Neal willed most of his land to R.W. Durham. Robert Waddell Durham (1818–1871), a partner in the Waddell branch of the Pony Express, came to California from Missouri. Durham became a close friend of Samuel Neal, and worked as Neal's business manager at the ranch. Durham, an early farming community, was settled by R.W. Durham and his brother, William W. Durham (1811-1873), in 1852. Like Neal, Durham never married and having no children of his own, sent for his nephews (sons of his other brother George Durham), George W. Durham (1834–1880) and William Wellington Durham (1844–1907) from Missouri, to assist him in managing the inherited rancho.

In 1868, R.W. Durham sold 17,800 acres (72.0 km^{2}) in the southerly part of Rancho Esquon to George Gridley and his eldest son, C.E. Gridley. George Gridley was a sheep rancher. R.W. Durham died in 1871, and his elder brother William died in 1873, and their portion of the rancho was subdivided in lots and sold. In 1879 George Gridley sold his 17,800 acres (72.0 km^{2}) to E.B. Pond, John Boggs and C.W. Clarke, who then sold them to Leland Stanford in 1880. The Stanford-Durham Ranch later became the property of Stanford University.
