= Drakes Bay Oyster Company =

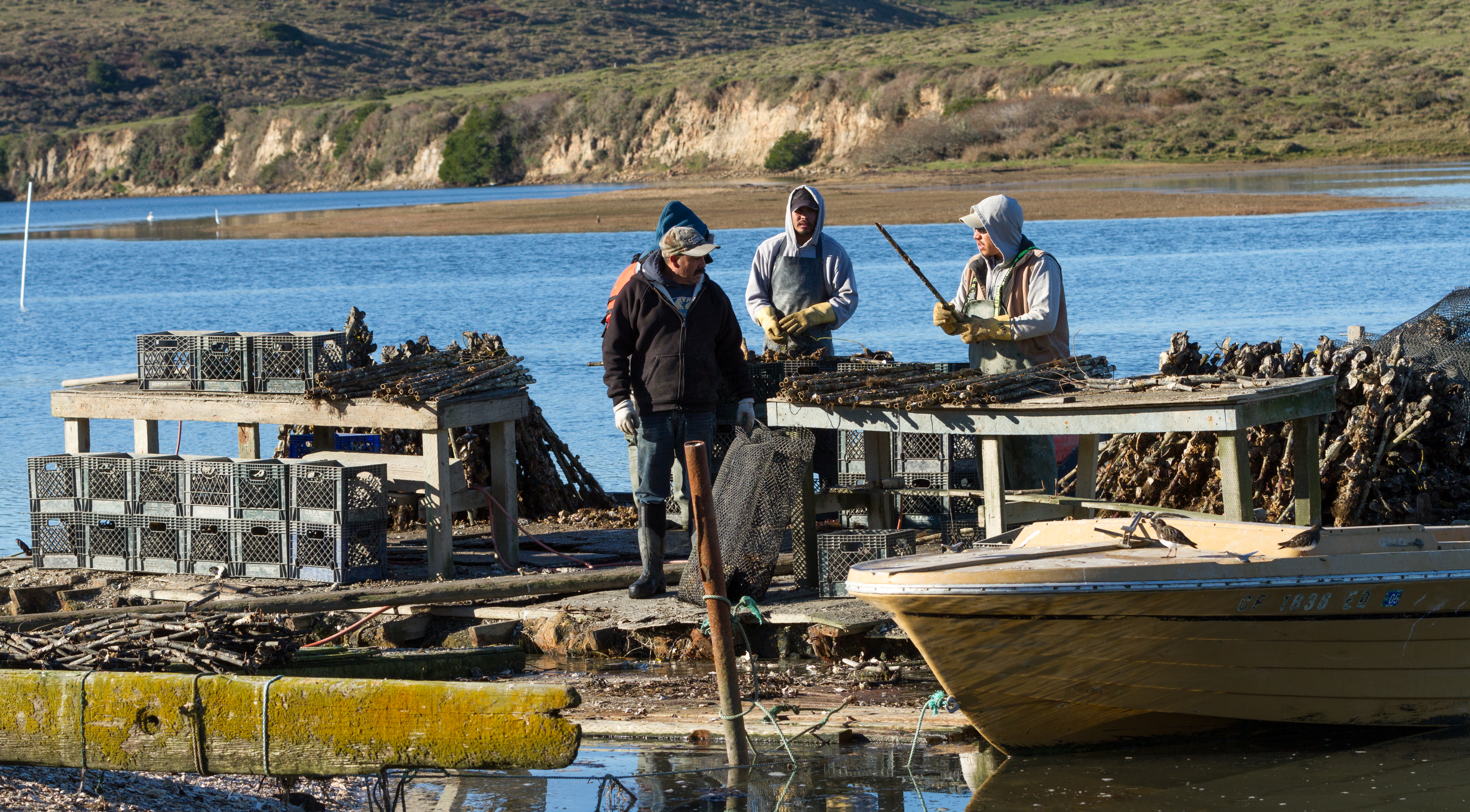
Drakes Bay Oyster Company

Drakes Bay Oyster Company was an oyster farm and restaurant formerly located at the shoreline and in Drakes Estero at 38°04'57.3"N 122°55'55.0"W, a bay within Point Reyes National Seashore, on the West Marin coast of Marin County, in Northern California, United States. In 2011, the lease for the business operation was not renewed at the direction of the United States Secretary of the Interior. After a two-year court battle, the business was terminated in December 2014, and Drakes Estero was cleared of the offshore racks and onshore structures, with the work completed in 2017.

== History ==
A lease was signed between the company and the National Park Service in 1972 for oyster farming within the bay. Drakes Estero is protected within the NPS Point Reyes National Seashore, part of the regional NPS Golden Gate National Recreation Area.

The company was one of the largest shellfish operations in California, producing over eight million non-native oysters a year.

=== Closure ===
The Drakes Bay Oyster Company's farm in the bay was originally slated to close on 31 July 2012, as its permit to operate had expired and the National Park Service had been directed to restore the area to its natural state. The decision to close the company was made in 2011 by Ken Salazar, the United States Secretary of the Interior on the grounds it would set a precedent for other park lands. Salazar had telephoned owner Kevin Lunny personally to inform him of the decision, and later stated “The estero is one of our nation's crown jewels, and today we are fulfilling the vision to protect this special place for generations to come."

The company's retail and restaurant operations on shore closed in July 2012. Due to an injunction filed by regional restaurants, the company continued to harvest oysters for commercial sales, until the National Park Service gave a 30-day notice for permanent closure of all operations.

In early December 2014, the legal case by the restaurants and other interests was dropped, and the company terminated the oyster operation completely by the end of December 2014.

Environmentalists hailed the outcome, allowing on-shore and off-shore environmental cleanup and habitat restoration projects to commence. The removal work, including 500 tons of debris, was completed in 2017. Upon final completion, the closure effectively returned Drake's Estero to its original ecosystem condition, and established the waters as a permanent wildlife sanctuary within the Phillip Burton Marine Wilderness Area and Point Reyes National Seashore.
