= Bertha Felix Campigli =

Bertha Felix Campigli (1882–1949; née Bertha May Felix) was an American/Coast Miwok photographer from California.

== Life ==
Bertha Felix was born in Lairds Landing, a cove of Tomales Bay, to Joseph and Paulina Felix. Joseph's parents were Euphrasia Felix, a Coast Miwok woman from San Francisco, and Domingo Felix, a Filipino immigrant; they and Joseph moved to Tomales Bay in 1860. Bertha Felix and her siblings attended Pierce Ranch, about three miles away from home, for their schooling.

Campigli's fourth husband was Arnold Campigli, a hunter and farmhand of Swiss-Italian descent whose parents disapproved of his marriage to an indigenous woman. She had eight children, the last of whom, Elizabeth, was born in 1925.

Campigli worked as a cook at several ranches around Tomales Bay. She died of tuberculosis in 1949.

== Art ==
Campligli's photographs have been shown at the Burke Museum in Seattle, and were included in the book Our People, Our Land, Our Images: International Indigenous Photographers in 2011.
