= Rancho Aguas Frias =

Mexican land grant in California

Coordinates: 39.630°N 121.750°W

Rancho Aguas Frias was a 26,761-acre (108.30 km^{2}) Mexican land grant in present-day Butte County, California given in 1844 by Governor Manuel Micheltorena to Antonio Maria Osio and his son Salvador Osio. Aguas Frias means "cold water" in Spanish. The grant, located south of present-day Chico, extended along the west bank of Butte Creek, and was bounded on the west by Rancho Llano Seco. Rancho Esquon was directly across Butte Creek.

== History ==
Antonio M. Osio (1800–1878) was also the grantee of the eleven square league Rancho Punta de los Reyes Sobrante given by Governor Micheltorena in 1843. Osio's son Salvador settled on the six square league Rancho Aguas Frias.

Osio sold Rancho Aguas Frias to Andrew Randall. Andrew Randall (1819–1856), a native of Rhode Island, came to California in 1849 as the newly appointed customs inspector for Monterey. Randall was an entrepreneur with training as a geologist. He founded, and was elected chairman of the California Academy of Sciences. In addition to Rancho Aguas Frias, he was the claimant for Rancho Punta de los Reyes and Rancho Punta de los Reyes Sobrante in Marin County; and Rancho Cañada de la Segunda and Rancho San Lorenzo in Monterey County - a little over 110,000 acres (445 km^{2}). However Randall had stretched his credit to the limit, and he could not or would not pay immediately. Joseph Hetherington, a creditor, undertook to force payment by hounding him on every occasion with insults and threats. Hetherington fatally shot Randall in a San Francisco hotel on July 24, 1856, and the Committee of Vigilance hanged Hetherington July 29, 1856.

With the cession of California to the United States following the Mexican-American War, the 1848 Treaty of Guadalupe Hidalgo provided that the land grants would be honored. As required by the Land Act of 1851, a claim for Rancho Aguas Frias was filed by Andrew Randall with the Public Land Commission in 1852. After the death of Randall, Samuel Todd substituted for Andrew Randall, and the grant was patented to Samuel Todd in 1860.

In 1859, Orville C. Pratt (1819-1891) purchased of the Rancho Aguas Frias. In 1849, Pratt was the first judicial appointee to Oregon's new Territorial Supreme Court. When Franklin Pierce was elected president, Pratt was removed as a federal judge. Pratt moved to San Francisco in 1856.
