= Rancho San Lorenzo (Randall) =

1842 Mexican land grant in California

Coordinates: 36.190°N 120.810°W

Rancho San Lorenzo was a 22,264-acre (90.10 km^{2}) Mexican land grant in present-day Monterey County, California given in 1842 by Governor Juan Alvarado to Francisco Rico. The grant extended along San Lorenzo Creek in Peach Tree Valley.

== History ==
=== Francisco Ygnicio Rico ===
Francisco Rico (1826–) was born Mexico and came to Monterey with his father, Vicente Rico, in 1831. Francisco Rico, was the grantee of Rancho San Lorenzo in 1842, and Rancho Del Rio Estanislao in 1843. In 1845 he was appointed by the Mexican Government second officer of the port of Monterey, under Pablo de la Guerra, and held the captaincy of a company of the Monterey cavalry. Rico was active with José María Flores on the Mexican side in the Mexican–American War. He was the leader of the escort of the captured Thomas O. Larkin. Flores dispatched Rico to retake San Diego, but he was recalled to Los Angeles. Rico and José Antonio Carrillo revolted against Flores. Flores was placed under arrest, but quickly was restored to power. Rico and Carrillo were jailed for the revolt, but released shortly afterwards. Rico married Tomasa Sepulveda (–1870) in 1847. After the Mexican–American War, Rico was extensively engaged in the cattle business in Monterey County. In 1849, he turned his attention to gold mining and merchandising, in partnership with Thomas O. Larkin. In 1855, Francisco Rico bought all of Rancho San Bernardo. The droughts of 1863 and 1864 resulted in heavy losses of stock, which finally proved a financial calamity to him.

=== Andrew Randall ===
Andrew Randall (1819–1856), a native of Rhode Island, came to California in 1849 as the newly appointed customs inspector for Monterey. Randall was an entrepreneur with training as a geologist. He founded, and was elected chairman of the California Academy of Sciences. In addition to Rancho San Lorenzo he was the claimant for Rancho Cañada de la Segunda in Monterey County; and Rancho Punta de los Reyes and Rancho Punta de los Reyes Sobrante in Marin County; and Rancho Aguas Frias in Butte County - a little over 110,000 acres (445 km^{2}). However he had stretched his credit to the limit, and Randall could not or would not pay immediately. Joseph Hetherington a creditor undertook to force payment by hounding him on every occasion with insults and threats. Hetherington fatally shot Randall in a San Francisco hotel on July 24, 1856, and the Committee of Vigilance hanged Hetherington July 29, 1856.

With the cession of California to the United States following the Mexican-American War, the 1848 Treaty of Guadalupe Hidalgo provided that the land grants would be honored. As required by the Land Act of 1851, a claim was filed with the Public Land Commission in 1853, and the grant was patented to Andrew Randall in 1870.

=== Peach Tree Ranch ===
Miller and Lux acquired Rancho San Lorenzo from the Randall heirs. Miller and Lux created the Peach Tree Ranch with the land. Subsequent owners of the ranch included George Mee. The Peach Tree Ranch remains an active ranch. It was most recently purchased by Henry Earl Singleton and it remains owned by the Singleton family.
