= Rancho Cañada de la Segunda =

Rancho in California

Rancho Cañada de la Segunda Rancho Cañada
- Mexican land grant
- Location in California Rancho Cañada de la Segunda (the United States)
- Coordinates: 36°33′36″N 121°52′12″W
- Country: United States
- State: California
- County: Monterey County, USA
- Established: 1839

Rancho Cañada de la Segunda was a 4,367-acre (17.67 km^{2}) Mexican land grant in present-day Monterey County, California given in 1839 by Governor José Castro to Lazaro Soto. The grant extended along the north bank of the Carmel River, from the Pacific coast and present day Carmel-by-the-Sea up into the Carmel Valley.

== History ==
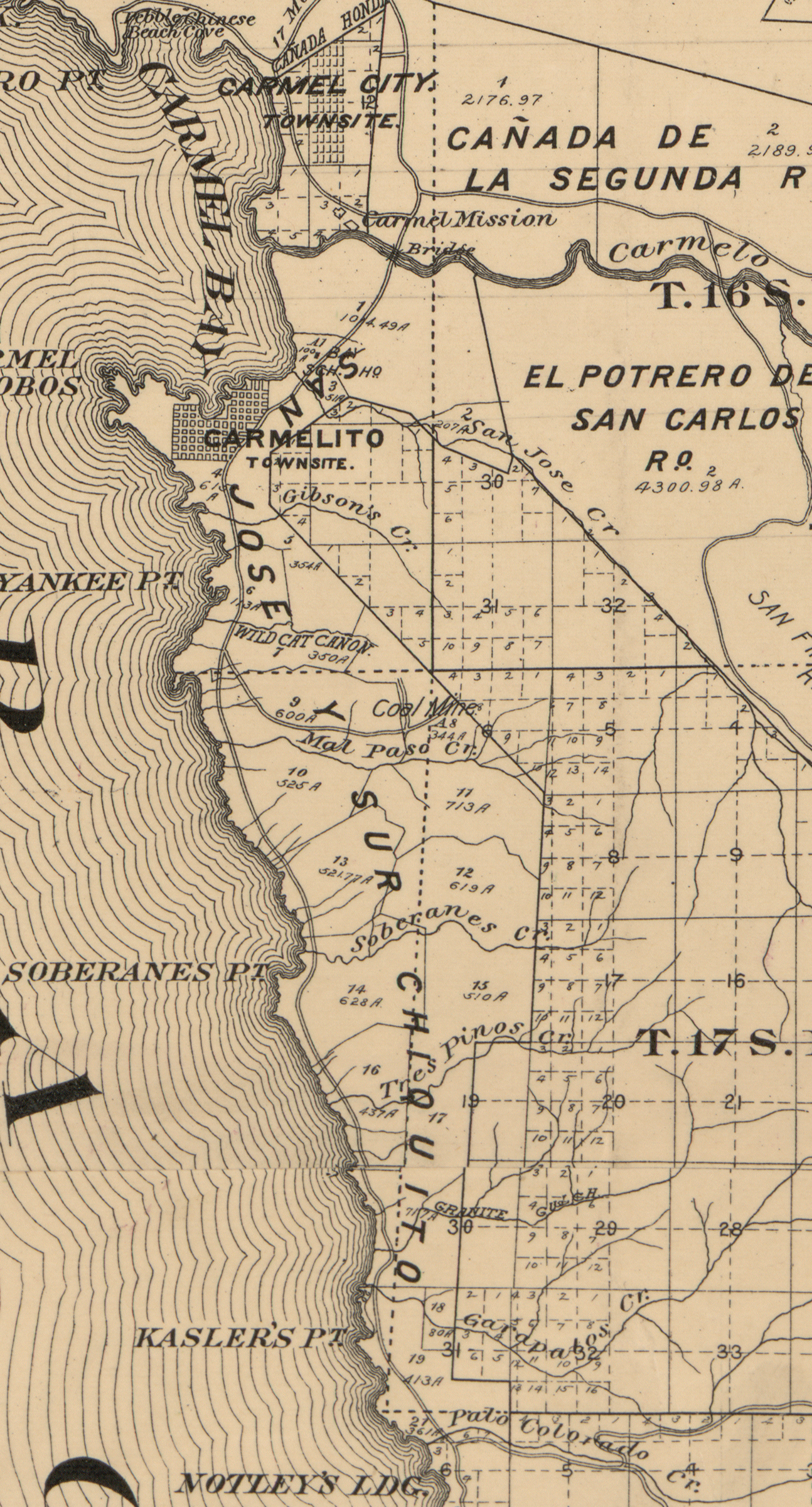
1898 map illustrating the legal boundaries of Rancho Cañada de la Segunda including the mouth of the Carmel River.

Lazaro Soto's grandfather, Ygnacio Soto, came to California with the De Anza Expedition. His father, Ysidoro Soto, was an officer in the Mexican army at Monterey. Lazaro Soto was also a soldier in the Mexican army of California. Lazaro Soto received the one square league grant in Carmel Valley in 1839. Lazaro Soto married Felicita Cantua and he and his family resided in Monterey. Lazaro Soto was the officer in charge of horses and munitions at the Battle of Natividad.

Lazaro Soto sold Rancho Cañada de la Segunda to Andrew Randall. Andrew Randall (1819–1856), a native of Rhode Island, came to California in 1849 as the newly appointed customs inspector for Monterey. Randall was an entrepreneur with training as a geologist. He founded, and was elected chairman of the California Academy of Sciences. In addition to Rancho Cañada de la Segunda, he was the claimant for Rancho San Lorenzo in Monterey County; Rancho Punta de los Reyes and Rancho Punta de los Reyes Sobrante in Marin County; and Rancho Aguas Frias in Butte County - a little over 110,000 acres (445 km^{2}). However Randall had stretched his credit to the limit, and he could not, or would not pay immediately. Joseph Hetherington, a creditor, undertook to force payment by hounding him on every occasion with insults and threats. Hetherington fatally shot Randall in a San Francisco hotel on July 24, 1856. Hetherington was allowed to have an interview with his attorney Fletcher Mathews Haight, and the Committee of Vigilance hanged Hetherington July 29, 1856.

Fletcher M. Haight (1799–1866), a prominent San Francisco lawyer, acquired the property from the Randall estate.

With the cession of California to the United States following the Mexican-American War, the 1848 Treaty of Guadalupe Hidalgo provided that the land grants would be honored. As required by the Land Act of 1851, a claim for Rancho Cañada de la Segunda was filed by Andrew Randall with the Public Land Commission in 1853, and the grant was patented to Fletcher M. Haight in 1859.

Faxon Dean Atherton (1815–1877) acquired the rancho in 1869. William Hatton (1849–1894), born in Ireland and married to Kate Harney (1851-1922), came to California in 1870. Hatton managed Rancho Los Laureles for the Pacific Improvement Company. In 1888, Hatton became the manager of the widowed Dominga Doni de Atherton's Rancho Cañada de la Segunda, and by 1892, Hatton had purchased the western section of the Rancho. Over time, he controlled over 10,000 acres in Carmel Valley.

After his Hatton's death in 1894, the Rancho Cañada properties were left in equitable divisions among his heirs. In 1925, Frank D. received the 909 acres (368 ha) Middle Dairy tract located on both sides of Carmel Valley Road about three miles east of Highway 1. Sarah (Hatton) McAulay was given the area known as Mission Fields, west of Frank Hatton's tract. Anna, who was married to William Martin, was given the area known as the Martin Ranch (now Mission Ranch) near the Carmel River State Beach. Harriet was given the area known as Rio Vista. William Jr. received the area now east of Rio Vista and bottom land, and Edward became owner of what was later called Hatton Fields.

On February 25, 1968, Gordon Knott and Nick Lombardo took a 55-year lease on 226 acres (91 ha) in Carmel Valley to open a 45-hole golf course. The name golf course was going to be Rancho Caňada de la Segunda, the name of the original Spanish land grant. The name was shorted to Rancho Caňada a year later.

In November 2015, Rancho Cañada decided not to renew its lease. In 2016, The Monterey Peninsula Regional Park District acquired 140 acres (57 ha) of the Rancho Caňada Country Club and golf course in Carmel Valley, that provides public access to the Palo Corona Regional Park. In a statement announcing the deal, Dryden Branson Bordin, representing the Hatton family, said, “This land has been in the family and contributing value to the community since the late 1800s. After receiving multiple offers on the property and much consideration, the family decided to sell the property to a group that could create an even greater public good.”

== See also ==
- Ranchos of California
- List of Ranchos of California
