= Rancho San Bernardo (Snook) =

Mexican land grant in California

Coordinates: 33.030°N 117.060°W

Rancho San Bernardo was a 17,763-acre (71.88 km^{2}) Mexican land grant in present-day San Diego County, California, with two square leagues given in 1842 by Governor Juan B. Alvarado and an additional two square leagues given in 1845 by Governor Pío Pico to José Francisco Snook. The grant was between present-day Escondido and Poway, and encompassed present-day Rancho Bernardo, 4S Ranch, San Pasqual Valley, and Lake Hodges.

== History ==
Joseph Snook (1798–1848), an Englishman, had been since 1824 a mariner along the Mexican coast, in the employ of Virmond, as master of the English brig Avacucho and later of the Mexican brig Catalina. In 1833, he became a Mexican citizen, and changed his name to Jose Francisco Snook. In 1837, Snook married Maria Antonia Alvarado (1811–), daughter of Juan Bautista Alvarado, grantee of Rancho Rincon del Diablo, which formed the north boundary of Rancho San Bernardo. In 1838, Snook and his wife took over an 8,800-acre (36 km^{2}) portion (known as the “Inverness Pocket”) of Berry’s Rancho Punta de los Reyes grant near Tomales Bay, and eventually gained title to it from Governor Alvarado. In 1839, Snook sold this land to Antonio Osio, and they returned to San Diego County. By 1842, Snook had received the two square league Rancho San Bernardo land grant from Governor Alvarado. In 1845 Snook convinced Governor Pico to add two square leagues. While Snook was away at sea, the rancho became the site of the 1846 Mexican–American War Battle of San Pasqual. Snook died in 1848 and his widow married Henry Clayton, who came to San Diego with the Mexican boundary survey.

With the cession of California to the United States following the Mexican-American War, the 1848 Treaty of Guadalupe Hidalgo provided that the land grants would be honored. As required by the Land Act of 1851, a claim for Rancho San Bernardo was filed with the Public Land Commission in 1852, and the grant was patented to María Antonia Alvarado de Snook in 1874.

In 1867, Snook's heirs sold Rancho San Bernardo to Thomas Fox acting for James McCoy, sheriff and state senator in 1868. McCoy had come to San Diego in 1850 as a soldier, and become one of the most influential citizens of the early American days. McCoy sold to Charles Wetmore, Sylvester Lyman and Omar Oaks. In 1886, Charles Snook of England sued Wetmore, Lyman and Oaks to recover a 2/9 interest in Rancho San Bernardo.

== See also ==
- Ranchos of California
- List of Ranchos of California
