= Drakes Estero =

Lagoon in California, United States

Drakes Estero is an expansive estuary within the Point Reyes National Seashore, located in Marin County, California. The estuary is located approximately 25 miles (40 km) northwest of San Francisco.

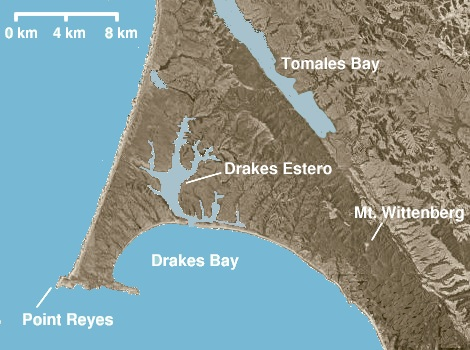
Drakes Estero

== Location and description ==
Situated at 38.047°N 122.942°W, the estuary provides the main drainage for the Point Reyes peninsula. Seen from the air, Drakes Estero resembles a human hand, with Barries Bay, Creamery Bay, Schooner Bay, and Home Bay as the "fingers" and Limantour Bay as the thumb. The waters of the Estero flow into Drakes Bay between Drakes Beach and a narrow strip of land called Limantour Spit.

== Conservation protections ==
Drakes Estero is a congressionally designated "potential wilderness area". Although Drakes Estero is protected as part of the National Seashore, legacy agricultural uses such as dairy farms and oyster aquaculture have led to controversy over the decreasing water quality, conservation status, and proper uses of this body of water.

Conservationists, including L. Martin Griffin, Jr. and oceanographer Sylvia Earle called for an end to the ongoing oyster farming in the estero. Senator Dianne Feinstein criticized the National Park Service, alleging that data used to support the non-renewal was flawed. On November 29, 2012, United States Secretary of the Interior Ken Salazar directed the National Park Service to allow the permit for oyster farming to expire, allowing the land and waters of the estero to return to their natural state.

A lawsuit was filed on December 4, 2012, by Kevin Lunny, the owner of Drakes Bay Oyster Company, to declare the decision by Salazar null and void. In February 2013, the 9th Circuit Court of Appeals issued an injunction on the order to close Drakes Bay Oyster Company until it heard the company's appeal. However, on January 14, 2014, the court declined to rehear the case. The final court challenge to the order to remove the oyster farming was dropped in early December 2014, with the removal of the operation completed in May 2017.

== History ==
Drakes Estero, the landing spot of Francis Drake on the coast of North America in 1579 during his circumnavigation of the world is a National Historic Landmark. A historical marker has been placed on Drakes Beach near the Kenneth C. Patrick Visitor Center and monuments to Drake have been erected at the Drake's Cove landing site. The Drake landing is interpreted at the Kenneth C. Patrick Visitor Center and the Point Reyes National Seashore's Bear Valley Visitor Center.

Drakes Estero is a component of the Phillip Burton Wilderness.

== Gallery ==
Drakes Bay and Estero from Point Reyes Hill

Drakes Estero undergoing restoration in 2015

== See also ==
- Abbotts Lagoon
- Bolinas Lagoon
- New Albion
- Tomales Bay
