= James McMillan Shafter =

19th century American politician

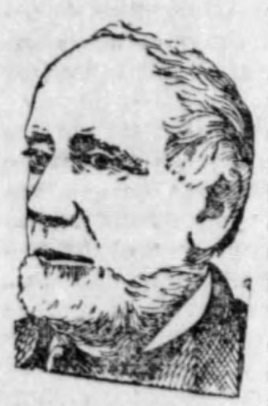
- Shafter in the San Francisco Examiner, 1892

Judge of the San Francisco County Superior Court
- In office August 1, 1889 – January 1, 1891
- Appointed by: Robert Waterman
- Preceded by: Jeremiah F. Sullivan

Delegate to the Second Constitutional Convention of California
- In office September 28, 1878 – March 3, 1879
- Preceded by: Office established
- Succeeded by: Office abolished
- Constituency: 3rd congressional district

12th President pro tempore of the California State Senate
- In office January 6, 1862 – May 15, 1862
- Preceded by: Richard Irwin
- Succeeded by: Addison M. Crane

Member of the California Senate from the 24th district
- In office January 1861 – January 1865
- Preceded by: Archibald C. Peachy
- Succeeded by: A. L. Tubbs

5th Speaker of the Wisconsin State Assembly
- In office January 14, 1852 – January 3, 1853
- Preceded by: Frederick W. Horn
- Succeeded by: Henry L. Palmer

Member of the Wisconsin State Assembly from the Sheboygan 1st district
- In office January 5, 1852 – January 3, 1853
- Preceded by: Albert D. La Due
- Succeeded by: David Taylor

13th Secretary of State of Vermont
- In office November 1842 – July 1849
- Governor: Charles Paine; John Mattocks; William Slade; Horace Eaton; Carlos Coolidge
- Preceded by: Alvah Sabin
- Succeeded by: Ferrand F. Merrill

Member of the Vermont House of Representatives from the Townsend district
- In office October 1, 1841 – October 1, 1843
- Preceded by: Samuel F. Thompson

Personal details
- Born: May 27, 1816 Athens, Vermont, U.S.
- Died: August 29, 1892 (aged 76) San Francisco, California, U.S.
- Cause of death: Diabetes
- Party: Republican; Natl. Union (1860s); Whig (before 1854)
- Spouse: Julia Granville Hubbard (m. 1845; died 1871)
- Children: Payne Jewett Shafter^{(b. 1846; died 1934)}; James Chester Shafter^{(b. 1851; died 1929)}; Chester Hubbard Shafter^{(b. 1854; died 1863)}; Julia Ruth (Hamiltony)^{(b. 1859; died 1936)}
- Relatives: Oscar L. Shafter (brother); William Rufus Shafter (nephew)
- Education: Wesleyan University; Yale Law School
- Profession: Lawyer

James McMillan Shafter (May 27, 1816 – August 29, 1892) was an American lawyer, politician, and pioneer of Wisconsin and California. He was the 13th Secretary of State of Vermont and the 5th speaker of the Wisconsin State Assembly (1852). Later in life he was a California state senator and superior court judge. Near the time of his death, his large dairy ranch in Marin County, California, was described as one of the largest ranches in the world—over 23,000 acres. His name was abbreviated in different ways over the course of his life, including J. McM. Shafter, Jas. M'm. Shafter, and other permutations.

== Early life and education ==
James McMillan Shafter was the fourth of six children born to William Rufus Shafter and his wife Mary (née Lovell). His older brother is Oscar L. Shafter. Through another brother, Hugh, he was an uncle of U.S. Army major general William Rufus Shafter, who was a recipient of the Medal of Honor for actions in the American Civil War. The Shafters were descended from James Shafter, an orphan who may have been born in England or shortly after his parents emigrated to the Massachusetts Bay Colony in the early 18th century. Its unknown if his parents' name was actually "Shafter" or if the orphan James just took that name after their death. Born in Athens, Vermont in 1816, Shafter attended public schools and then graduated from Wesleyan University ni 1837. Two years later, he graduated from Yale Law School and was admitted to the Vermont bar in 1840.

== Career ==
He went to work as a lawyer in Townsend, Vermont, where he remained for three years before moving to Burlington, Vermont. While living in Townsend, he was elected to the Vermont House of Representatives in 1841, and he was then elected Secretary of State of Vermont, serving from 1842 until resigning in the summer of 1849, in order to seek out new opportunities in the west.

In 1850, he first moved to Sheboygan, Wisconsin, and was elected to the Wisconsin State Assembly in 1851. During the 1852 legislative session, Shafter served as speaker of the Assembly. In the fall of 1852, he was the Whig Party nominee for United States House of Representatives in Wisconsin's 3rd congressional district, but he lost that election to Democrat John B. Macy.

In 1855, he then moved to San Francisco, California, where he practiced law with his brother, Oscar L. Shafter. In 1857, a complex real estate litigation resulted in the Shafter firm winning a victory for their client of 75,000 acres of farm land (including Rancho Punta de los Reyes Sobrante and Rancho Punta de los Reyes) at Point Reyes in Marin County. The client sold the property to the Shafters. They leased it to dairy farmers who provided milk and butter to an ever-growing San Francisco and prospered. The Shafter families owned most of Point Reyes from 1857 to 1919, when the land was sold in parcels.

In 1862, Shafter served in the California State Senate and was its President pro tempore. Shafter also served in the California Constitution Convention of 1878 and was on the University of California Board of Regents ex officio as President of the California State Agricultural Association. In November 1885, he was appointed one of the original trustees of Leland Stanford Junior University.

In March 1888, Shafter survived a gunshot at close range. His son, Dr. James Shafter, had sued for a divorce and the wife's brother, angry at the proceedings, confronted the elder Shafter in the San Francisco City Hall. The brother fired four times at point blank range but missed his mark.

In 1889, Governor Robert Waterman appointed Shafter as judge of the San Francisco County Superior Court to fill the vacancy from the resignation of Jeremiah F. Sullivan. Near the time of his death, his large dairy ranch in Marin County, California, was described as one of the largest ranches in the world—over 23,000 acres.

== Personal life ==
In 1845, James McMillan Shafter married Julia Granville Hubbard (September 11, 1821 – February 11, 1871) in Montpelier, Vermont, who had studied at Troy Female Seminary. They had at least four children: Payne Jewett Shafter, James Chester Shafter, Chester Hubbard Shafter, and Julia Ruth Shafter.

At the time of his death, in 1892, Shafter left an estate worth about $1,000,000 (about $33,000,000 adjusted for inflation to 2023).

Vermont House of Representatives
Preceded by Samuel F. Thompson	Member of the Vermont House of Representatives from the Townsend district October 1, 1841 – October 1, 1843	Succeeded by Nathan Fisher
Wisconsin State Assembly
Preceded by Albert D. La Due	Member of the Wisconsin State Assembly from the Sheboygan 1st district January 5, 1852 – January 3, 1853	Succeeded by David Taylor
Preceded by Frederick W. Horn	Speaker of the Wisconsin State Assembly; 1852–1853	Succeeded by Henry L. Palmer
California Senate
Preceded by Archibald C. Peachy	Member of the California Senate from the San Francisco district January 1861 – January 1865	Succeeded by A. L. Tubbs
Preceded by Richard Irwin	President pro tempore California State Senate; 1862	Succeeded by A. M. Crane
Political offices
Preceded by Alvah Sabin	Secretary of State of Vermont; 1842–1849	Succeeded by Ferrand F. Merrill
