= Inverness Ridge =

- Location within California

Highest point
- Elevation: 1,407 ft (429 m) NAVD 88
- Coordinates: 38°06′06″N 122°53′13″W

Geography
- Location: Marin County, California, U.S.
- Topo map: USGS Drakes Bay

Inverness Ridge is a ridge located on the Point Reyes Peninsula in western Marin County, California. It reaches an elevation of 1,407 feet (429 m).

== See also ==
- Inverness
- Inverness Park
- Bolinas Ridge
