= L. Martin Griffin =

American environmentalist (1920–2024)

L. Martin Griffin Jr.
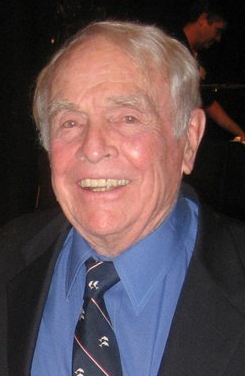
- Born: Loyal Martin Griffin Jr. July 23, 1920; Ogden, Utah, U.S.
- Died: May 22, 2024 (aged 103)
- Occupations: Doctor, writer, environmentalist, vintner
- Writing career
- Period: 1998–2024 (as writer)
- Genres: Nature writing, Environmentalism
- Subjects: Ecology, Conservation
- Notable work: Saving the Marin-Sonoma Coast
- Website: www.martingriffin.org

Loyal Martin Griffin Jr. (July 23, 1920 – May 22, 2024), commonly known as Marty Griffin, was an American environmentalist and conservationist in Northern California and author of the book Saving the Marin–Sonoma Coast. He was also a doctor, director of the Sonoma Developmental Center, head of the Marin Audubon Society, board member of the Marin Municipal Water District, and owner of Hop Kiln Winery in Sonoma County.

Griffin was widely honored, including by the National Park Service in an article, for his decades of environmental work in helping to preserve numerous sensitive wildlife habitats in Sonoma and Marin County.

== Childhood and education ==
Griffin was born on July 23, 1920, in Ogden, Utah, and his family moved to California in his youth. Exposure to nature as a Boy Scout gave him a love of wild places and fly fishing. He studied medicine and graduated from Stanford University, subsequently setting up medical practice as an internist in Marin County.

== Environmental activism ==
=== Influences ===
Griffin stated his environmental heroes included John Muir, Teddy Roosevelt and Congressman William Kent, the latter of whom helped establish Marin's Muir Woods National Monument, the Marin Municipal Water District watershed, and started the movement to preserve Mount Tamalpais and West Marin. Griffin also noted the influence of Caroline S. Livermore, a founder of the Marin Conservation League.

=== Richardson Bay and Bolinas Lagoon ===
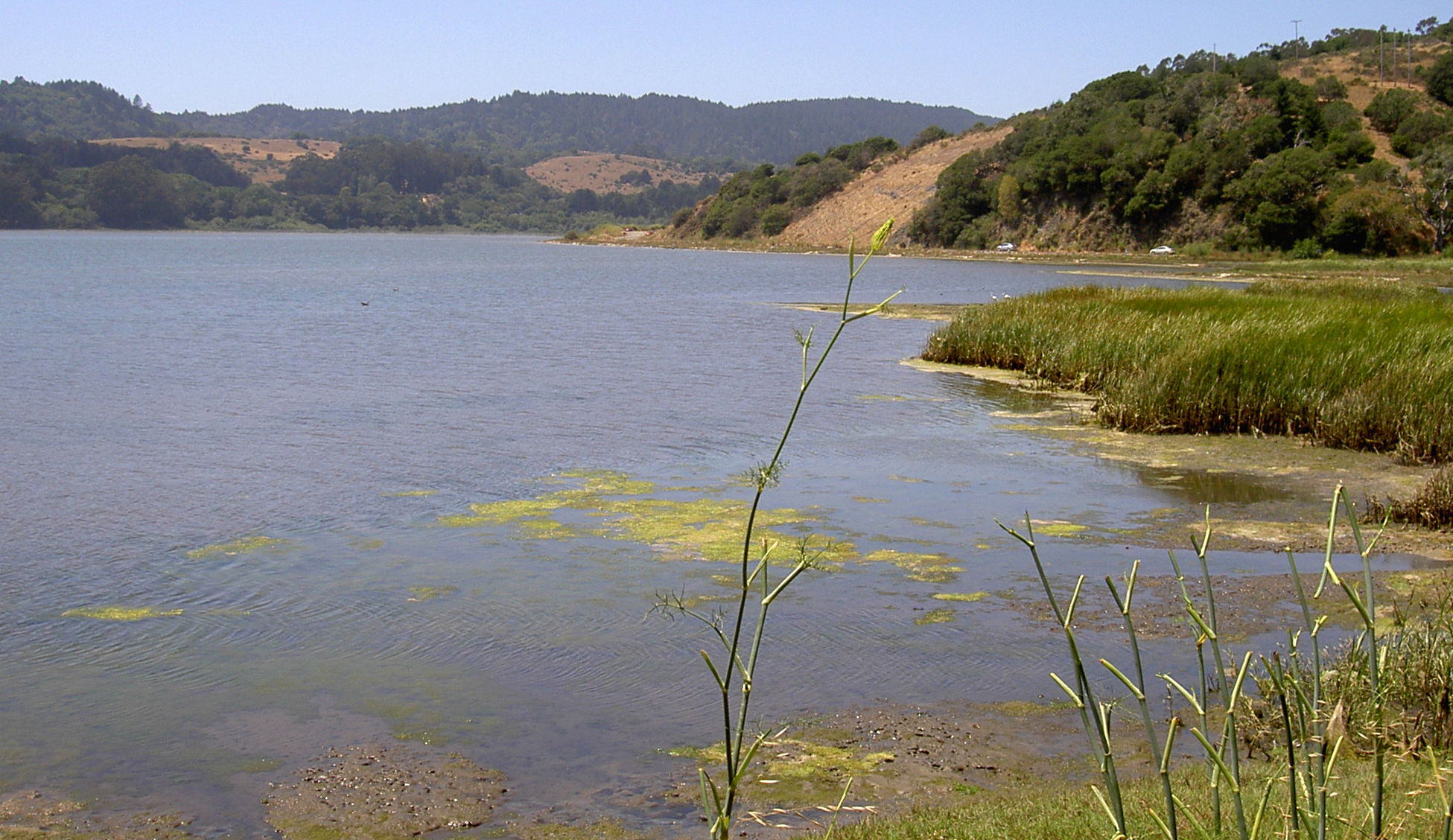
North end of Bolinas Lagoon, looking northwest from California State Route 1 near Audubon Canyon.

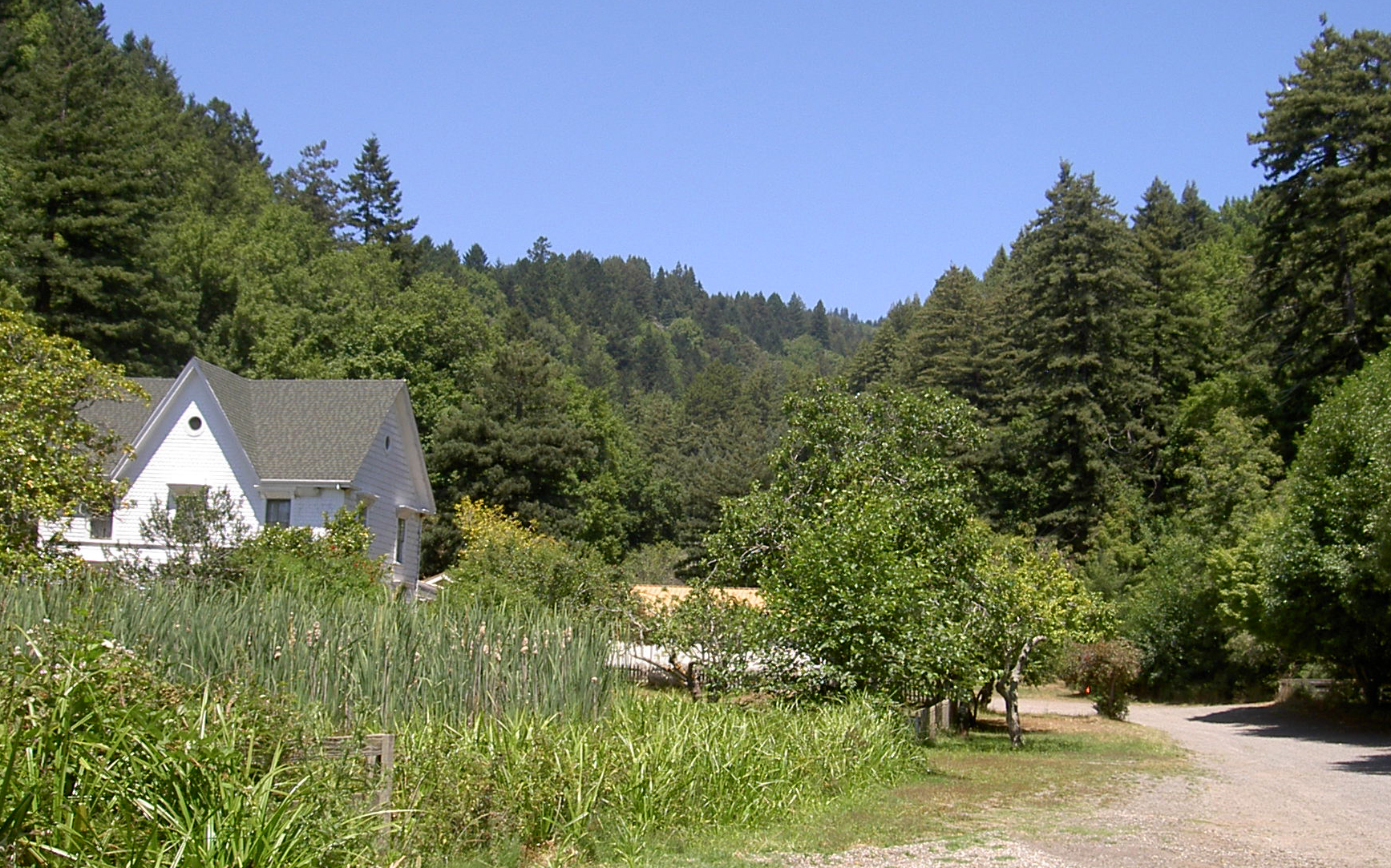
House at Audubon Canyon Ranch, seen from California State Route 1.

After being contacted by activist Elizabeth Terwilliger, Griffin played a substantial part in establishing wildlife sanctuaries along Richardson Bay, working with and learning from environmentalist Caroline Livermore. Their work helped prevent the filling in of the bay and tidelands for a housing development. Griffin took note of Livermore's strategy of raising money to purchase sensitive areas threatened by construction. Using the same tactics, Griffin worked to prevent development in and around Bolinas Lagoon. In 1962 Griffin wrote a personal check for one thousand dollars (which he was unsure he had the funds to cover) to put a hold on the key property called the Canyon Ranch (now Audubon Canyon Ranch) that was for sale for $337,000. He then solicited help from chapters of the Audubon Society to raise the rest of the cash.

In later years, as the local Audubon chapter's acquisition manager, he played a major role in the effort to buy additional property around the lagoon and at Tomales Bay, where a city was planned on the bay's east side.

Noting the need for secrecy in preventing development, Griffin observed in 2010 that "We had to keep all the operations very secretive because once someone else found out what you were up to it was trouble."

=== Stopping a freeway and a nuclear power plant ===
Griffin also helped stop a planned freeway from the Golden Gate Bridge through West Marin to Sonoma County, which would have enabled construction along its route. The freeway was touted by then California Governor Edmund G. Brown as part of a plan to locate 150,000 new residents on the Northern California coast, including substantial housing development in what was to eventually become Point Reyes National Seashore. Griffin stated: "I went to a meeting [in the late 1950s] on the proposed large freeway going from the Golden Gate Bridge to West Marin and up the Sonoma Coast. I picked up a brochure and was horrified when I saw the maps. The freeway was going to destroy Bolinas Lagoon and Tomales Bay. I knew we needed to save this."

He also helped to derail the planned Bodega Bay Nuclear Power Plant at Bodega Bay on the Sonoma coast. The plant, to be located atop the San Andreas Fault, was in the first stages of construction on Bodega Head when it was halted. Griffin also worked to stop a proposed water pipeline from the Russian River to Marin.

The executive director of Audubon Canyon Ranch, Scott Feierabend, commented in July 2010 that Griffin's work to save the coastal areas of Marin and Sonoma Counties was crucial, stating to the Marin Independent Journal "He saw that the whole coastlines of Marin and Sonoma were such a treasure. He understood if he could acquire keystone properties along the coastline they would be impediments to any linear construction."

=== Preserving land in Sonoma County ===
Griffin was also active in Sonoma County where he owned the Hop Kiln Winery. He lived in Sonoma County from 1974 until he moved back to Marin thirty years later. He helped establish the Bouverie Audubon Preserve with a gift from David Bouverie. Griffin also co-founded the Friends of the Russian River to preserve the Russian and other rivers in California from logging, gravel mining, dams and destruction of riparian habitat. He was instrumental in establishing the Griffin Russian River Riparian Preserve and Gina's Orchard Preserve.

=== Point Reyes National Seashore, film appearance ===
Into his 90s, Griffin continued to speak out about conservation issues. He criticized efforts by Senator Dianne Feinstein to allow the continued operation of a shellfish farm and tasting bar in the Phillip Burton Wilderness, a sensitive coastal area of Point Reyes National Seashore. Writing a featured commentary in the Marin Independent Journal in 2009, he asked "Why protect Drakes Estero? It shelters the largest rookery of breeding and pupping harbor seals on the north coast. It is a vital nursery for ocean fish. It is refuge for migratory ocean birds, its shoals home to countless invertebrates nourished by tidal water from the ocean. It is a magical, isolated, historic inlet on the wild, rugged coast."

In August, 2012 Griffin again weighed in forcefully on the issue of the commercial shellfish farming business. Writing in an op-ed in the Santa Rosa Press Democrat, Griffin was direct in his opposition to the continued operations of the Drakes Bay Oyster Company: "Sen. Dianne Feinstein has continued political obstruction on behalf of the company in this nationally significant policy decision, and it must stop." He noted "This year is the national seashore's 50th anniversary. Let's not drive a stake through its ecological heart, but rather honor the legacy of John Muir, Clem Miller, Peter Behr and others, and let the estero go wild."

Griffin's advocacy efforts, as well as those of others, were vindicated when U.S. Interior Secretary Ken Salazar declined to renew the oyster farm lease in November 2012. Asked in February 2013 for comment on a federal judge's refusal to issue an injunction to continue to allow the operation of the farm past the March 15 deadline for removal of all farm equipment, Griffin said "It's been a long battle, the judge studied it very carefully and I think she made the right decision." The cleanup of the farming operation was completed in May 2017.

In another media appearance, Griffin was interviewed for, and appeared in, a documentary film on the history of the successful effort to save Marin County land from development, Rebels with a Cause. The film, narrated by actress Frances McDormand, was released in June 2013. The movie was produced by Nancy Kelly and Kenji Yamamoto, was described by the Marin Independent Journal as "powerful" and "generating a strong buzz" during a lengthy run in Marin.

== Personal life and death ==
Griffin lived in Belvedere, California. Griffin turned 100 in July 2020, and died on May 22, 2024, at the age of 103.

== Honors ==
- The Griffin Loop Trail at Audubon Canyon Ranch is named in his honor.
- Griffin won the 'Ted Wellman Water Award' from the Marin Conservation League in 1997.
- He was awarded the 2005 Citizen Emeritus Award by the city of Belvedere.
- In 2007 he was named on a list of Marin's 13 Most Influential by Marin Magazine.
- Also in 2007, he was presented with the 2007 Environmental Leader of Marin Award by the Environmental Education Council of Marin.
- He was honored one day after his 90th birthday on July 24, 2010, at a special sold-out event at the Audubon Canyon Ranch. It was announced that the 1,000-acre (4.0 km^{2}) Bolinas Lagoon Preserve, administered by the Audubon Canyon Ranch, would be renamed the Martin Griffin Preserve.
- Griffin was awarded the 'Bay Nature Award' for lifetime achievement as a conservation leader on Jan 22, 2011.
- He was honored with the first John Muir Legacy Conservation Award by the John Muir Association in Martinez CA on Saturday, April 20, Earth Day 2013.
- Griffin's environmental accomplishments were recognized by the National Park Service in an article in May, 2020.
