= Marin Conservation League =

The Marin Conservation League is a environmental organization based in Marin County, California.

== History ==
The League, first called the Citizens Survey Committee, was founded in 1934 by four members of the Marin Garden Club: Caroline Sealy Livermore, Sepha Evers, Portia Forbes, and Helen Van Pelt. The Golden Gate Bridge was being built, and they worried about the increased automobile traffic and privatization of public land. Their stated goal was "to preserve, protect, and enhance the natural assets of Marin County for all people." Their early projects included working with the Tamalpais Conservation Club to add 531 acres to Mount Tamalpais State Park, helping to buy 54 acres at Drakes Bay Beach, raising $20,000 to buy a portion of Stinson Beach, and aiding in the creation of Samuel P. Taylor State Park. In 1945, they helped obtain the land for the Marin Art and Garden Center.

After World War II, the League also helped create Tomales Bay State Park, Angel Island State Park, Point Reyes National Seashore, Olompali State Historic Park, the Marin County Open Space District, and the Ring Mountain Open Space Preserve. They also added land to Muir Woods, prevented Bolinas Lagoon from being turned into a harbor, and stopped Richardson Bay from being filled in.

== Notable members ==
- John Amsden Starkweather, professor, and his wife Jean Starkweather, who served as president 1993-1995
- Peter H. Behr, state senator
