= Indian Beach =

Indian Beach may refer to:

- Indian Beach (Marin County, California), a beach within Tomales Bay State Park in Marin County, California
- Indian Beach (Oregon), a beach within Ecola State Park in Oregon
- Indian Beach, Delaware
- Indian Beach, Florida, a historical neighborhood in Sarasota
- Indian Beach, North Carolina
- Old Home Beach (also known as Indian Beach), a beach in Trinidad, Humboldt County, California
