= Marin Art and Garden Center =

Botanical garden in Ross, California, US

- U.S. National Register of Historic Places
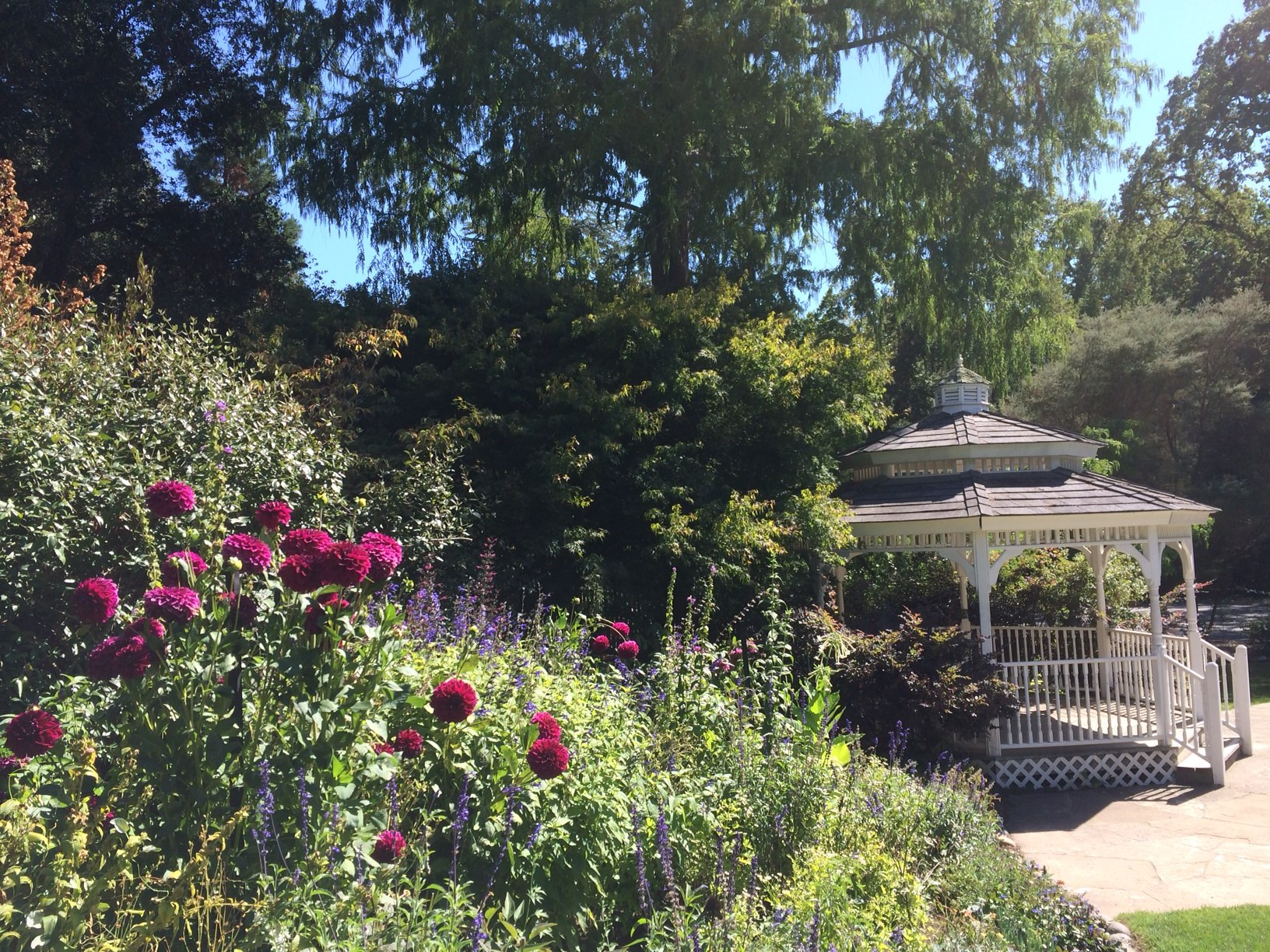
- Location: 30 Sir Francis Drake Blvd, Ross, Marin County, California, United States
- Coordinates: 37°57′48″N 122°33′16″W
- Area: 11 acres (4.5 ha)
- Built: 1945; 81 years ago
- Website: maringarden.org
- NRHP reference No.: 100007228
- Added to NRHP: June 6, 2022

The Marin Art and Garden Center is a botanical garden and arts organization in Ross, California. The site is 11 acres (4.5 ha) and features gardens and historic buildings, including the Barn Theater, which is home to theater company the Ross Valley Players. Admission to the gardens is free.

The property was added to the National Register of Historic Places on June 6, 2022.

== History ==
The land where the Marin Art and Garden Center sits was part of Rancho Punta de Quentin, a 10,000-acre Mexican land grant purchased by James Ross in 1859. A few years later, the property went to Ross's daughter Annie and her husband George Worn. The acres that make up the current Marin Art and Garden Center were eventually owned by the Jonathan Kittle family, who put the land up for sale in 1943.

The Marin Art and Garden Center was founded in 1945 by women members of the Marin Conservation League. This project was led by the League's president, Caroline Sealy Livermore, who organized fundraising to obtain the $25,000 needed to buy the property. The site was the location for the Marin County Fair from 1947 to 1970.

== Gardens and features ==
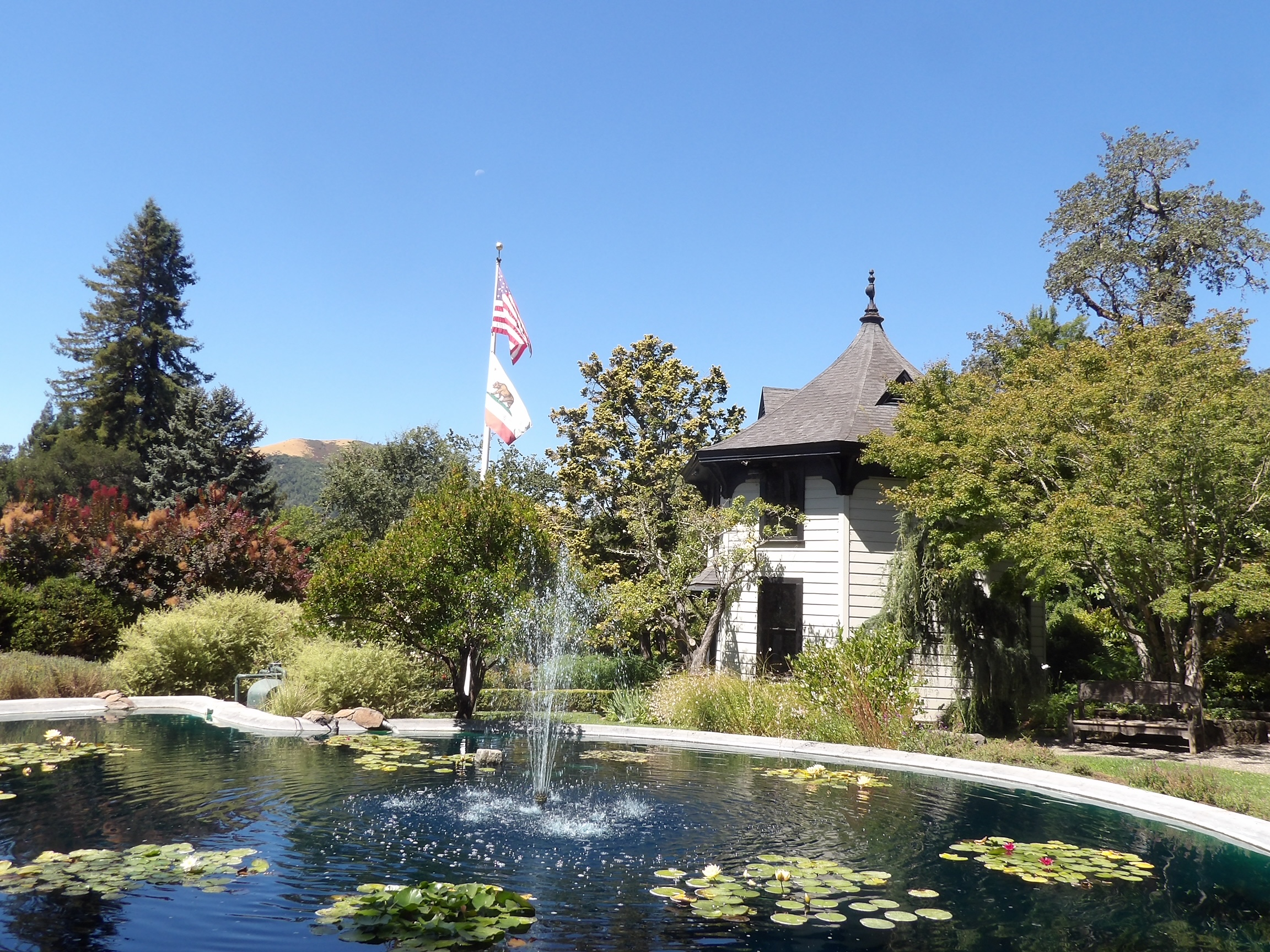
The fountain pond and Octagon House

The Marin Art and Garden Center's master plan was designed by landscape architect Thomas Church. It contains several different gardens, including those focused on roses, edible plants, plants used in basketry, and native plants. There are three species of redwood on the site, including the dawn redwood. A giant sequoia on the property was brought in from Yosemite Valley during the Worns' ownership.

Buildings on the property include modernist buildings and the Octagon House, which was once a pump house and later the José Moya del Piño Library. There are also an art studio by Gardner Dailey and the "Bottle House" by Ray Oleson, both built in the late 1940s. The property's border is marked by crinkle-crankle brick walls.

Pixie Park Playground, designed by Robert Royston, is located at the center. It was founded in 1952 by Elizabeth Terwilliger and American Association of University Women as a space for MAGC volunteers' children.

=== Ross Valley Players ===
The Barn Theater is the headquarters of the Ross Valley Players. The barn was built in 1860 on the farm later owned by the Kittle family. During the Great Depression, the community in Ross began using the barn as a theater. The Ross Valley Players assisted in the effort to turn the land into a garden in 1945.

== See also ==
- National Register of Historic Places listings in Marin County, California
- Mount Tamalpais Mountain Theater
