= Elizabeth Terwilliger =

American environmental activist and educator

- Born: Elizabeth Cooper; September 13, 1909; Oahu, Hawaii
- Died: November 27, 2006 (aged 97); Mill Valley, California
- Education: University of Hawaiʻi, Columbia University, Stanford University
- Occupation: Educator
- Known for: Environmental activism

Elizabeth Terwilliger (September 13, 1909 – November 27, 2006) was an American environmental activist and educator based in Marin County, California.

== Early life and education ==
Terwilliger, born Elizabeth Cooper, was born to Dr. Henry Bryant Cooper and Florence Carson Cooper in Oahu, where Dr. Cooper worked as a physician on a sugar plantation. Hiking around the island with her mother inspired Terwilliger's love of nature.

After earning at bachelor's degree at the University of Hawaiʻi, Terwilliger attended graduate school at Columbia University, where she earned a master's degree in nutrition. She then studied nursing at Stanford University, where she met her husband, Calvin Terwilliger, who was a surgeon.

== Activism and volunteer work ==
After World War II, Elizabeth and Calvin Terwilliger moved to Marin County, where Elizabeth advocated for more playgrounds. She founded Pixie Park Playground at the Marin Art and Garden Center.

In the 1950s, there was a plan to fill Richardson Bay to create a town called Reeds Port. Terwilliger, working with the Marin Audubon Society and Caroline Sealy Livermore, contacted L. Martin Griffin to enlist him in the ultimately successful effort to stop the development.

Terwilliger began leading her children's Girl Scouts and Boy Scouts troops, teaching the scouts about nature. This led to Terwilliger, known to children as "Mrs. T," leading nature walks for local schools and organizations, which she would continue into her 80s. The Terwilliger Nature Guides was founded in 1970. In 1975, the Elizabeth Terwilliger Nature Education Foundation (later called WildCare) was formed to provide nature education to Bay Area schools. Terwilliger developed its educational programs.

In 1984, she was given the Outstanding Volunteer Award by President Ronald Reagan.

Terwilliger also advocated for monarch butterfly conservation, wetlands conservation, and bicycle paths.

== Legacy ==
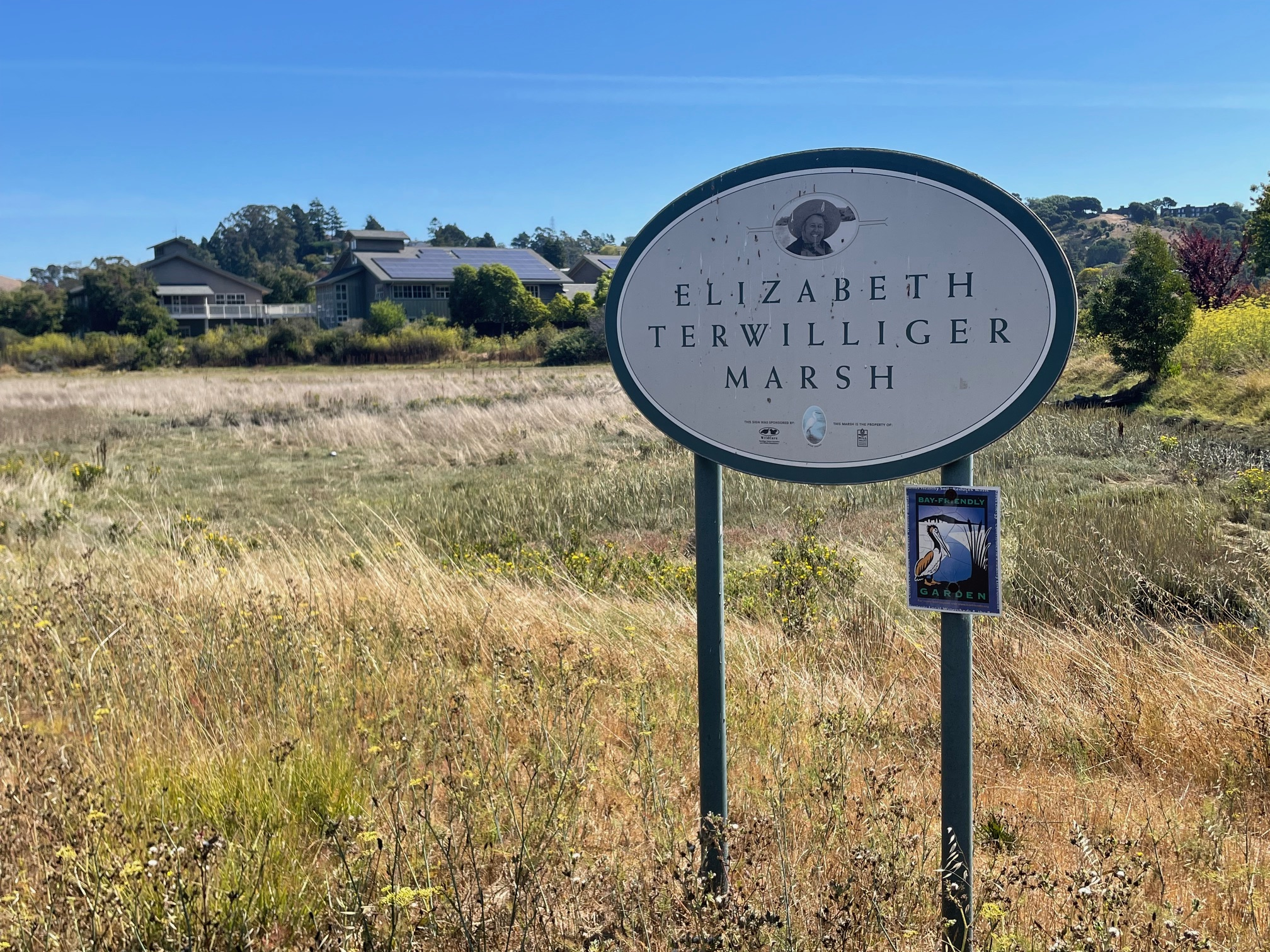
The Elizabeth Terwilliger Marsh in Mill Valley

The Terwilliger Nature Center in San Rafael (now WildCare), Terwilliger Grove in Muir Woods, and Terwilliger Marsh in Mill Valley are all named for her. The Terwilliger Environmental Award honors environmental educators in the Bay Area.
