= Jose Moya del Pino =

Spanish-born American artist (1891–1969)

José Moya del Pino
- Born: March 3, 1890; Priego de Cordoba, Andalusia, Spain
- Died: March 7, 1969 (aged 79); Ross, California, U.S.
- Resting place: Olivet Memorial Park (formerly Mount Olivet Cemetery), Horst family plot, Colma, California, U.S.
- Education: Royal Academy of Fine Arts of San Fernando, Académie Colarossi
- Years active: 1908 –1962
- Known for: Painting, murals, portraiture, book illustration
- Movement: Post-impressionists of Spain, Depression-era Muralist
- Spouse: Helen Pauline Horst (m. December 26, 1928)
- Children: 3
- Relatives: Emil Clemens Horst (father in-law)
- Website: http://www.moyadelpino.com

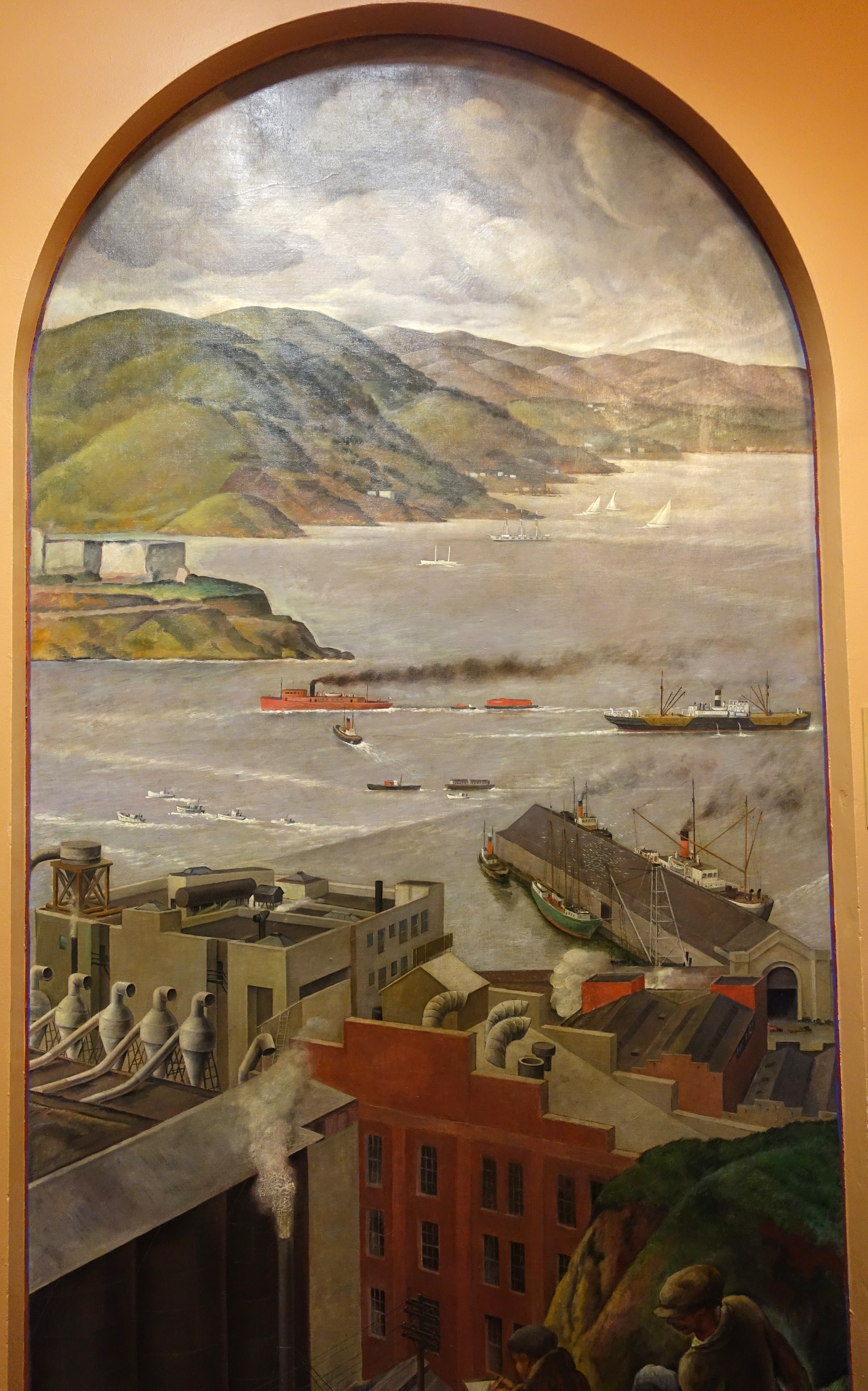
San Francisco Bay, North (1934), Coit Tower mural by José Moya del Pino

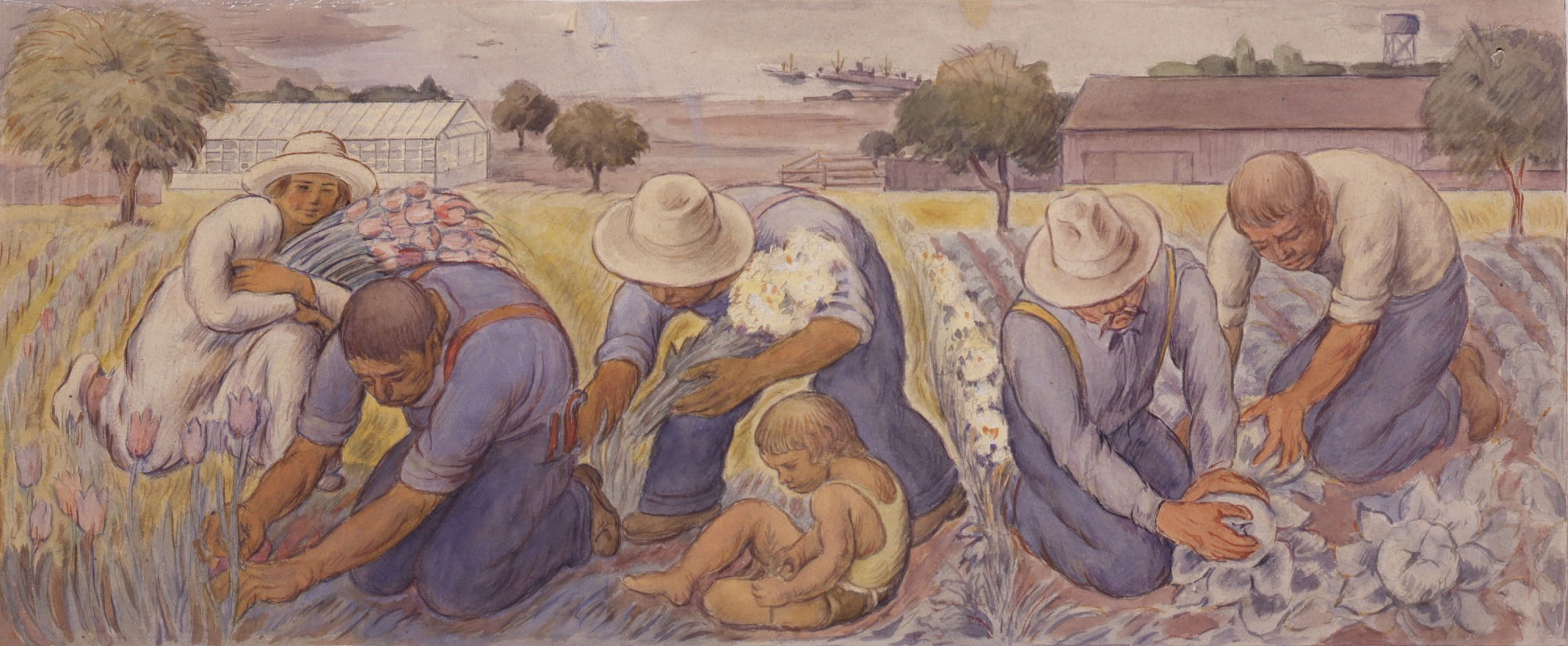
Study for Flower Farming and Vegetable Raising, 1937 mural for the U.S. post office in downtown Redwood City, California

José Moya del Pino (1890–1969) was a Spanish-born painter, muralist and educator and a prolific and celebrated artist in California in the mid-twentieth century. Born in Priego de Córdoba, Andalusia, he trained in Granada, Madrid, and Paris before embarking on a monumental tour of the United States with 41 original copies of Velázquez masterpieces.

When the tour ended and political instability in Spain made return impossible, he settled in San Francisco, where he built a distinguished career as a portraitist, muralist, illustrator, and teacher spanning four decades. His large-scale murals in the Merchants Exchange Commerce Club, Coit Tower, the Golden Gate International Exposition, and numerous post offices from coast to coast helped shape the visual identity of California during the New Deal era. He taught classes at the San Francisco Art Students League, San Francisco Art Institute and the College of Marin. He died in 1969 in Ross, Marin County, California where he had lived since 1938.

== Early life ==
José Moya del Pino was born on March 3, 1890 in Priego de Cordoba, Andalusia, Spain. His full baptismal name was José Manuel Emeterio de San Cayetano Moya del Pino. His father, Miguel Moya Garrido, came from a family of standing in Frailes (his paternal grandfather had served as the town’s mayor). His mother, María del Carmen del Pino Codes, came from a prosperous merchant family in Priego.

In Priego, the family operated a Castile soap factory, investing most of their savings in the venture. José’s brothers, Miguel and Manuel, died in a measles epidemic while still young; José survived the disease, waking one morning to find the house crowded with mourners — a memory he later described as one of the most vivid and devastating of his childhood. The family subsequently moved to Alcalá la Real, a nearby town in the province of Jaen, Spain.

Around age ten, Moya del Pino formed a friendship with itinerant painter Carlos Mouton, and when the painter left town to travel through the Andalusian countryside painting votive saints for village churches, young José ran away from home to join him as his apprentice. Mouton prepared pigments in pig-intestine casings; José ground colors and stretched canvases. The experience gave him an early grounding in the chemistry of paint and the demands of painting directly for a public.

== Education ==
=== Granada ===
Around 1903 or 1904, Moya del Pino moved to Granada, where he began his formal artistic training. He enrolled at the School of Industrial Arts, while apprenticing with the painter Rafael Latorre Viedma in his studio on the Carrera del Darro. Moya received intensive practical training in painting, fresco preparation, tempera, and color, while also becoming involved in the city's contemporary artistic debates. In 1904, at age fourteen, he exhibited Escritorio de Señorita (A Young Lady's Writing Desk) at Granada's Exhibition of Fine Arts and Industrial Arts, where he received a Third-Class Diploma in Painting. He left Granada for Madrid in 1907.

After leaving Granada, he maintained a connection with the city's artistic and literary circles. In 1909 and 1910 he published a series of articles in the Granada magazine La Alhambra, edited by the art critic Francisco de Paula Valladar. His articles addressed contemporary artistic issues including Futurism, the relationship between illustration and text, and the need to modernize art education in Spain. Some of his illustrations were also published in La Alhambra in 1910: Nocturno, Estudio, and one of his first book cover illustrations. These works, provide early evidence of the modernist ideas that would inform his subsequent work as an illustrator.

=== Madrid and Paris ===
In 1907, Moya del Pino moved to Madrid to continue his artistic studies at the Royal Academy of Fine Arts of San Fernando (then called the Special School of Painting, Sculpture and Engraving). He also studied under Joaquín Sorolla. He completed his studies with distinction, receiving medals in Art History and Anatomy. In 1910, he was awarded Spain’s Premio de Roma, a competitive scholarship for promising young Spanish artists that provided for study in Rome. Moya traveled to Rome but found the academic program too conservative and successfully petitioned the Spanish Foreign Office to transfer his scholarship to Paris.

Moya del Pino arrived in Paris during the period when Montparnasse was a major center of the European avant-garde. He studied at the Académie Colarossi and the Académie de la Grande Chaumière, and became acquainted with artists including Henri Matisse and Amedeo Modigliani. Through Diego Rivera and Juan Gris, he was introduced to the Paris salon of Leo and Gertrude Stein, where he encountered works by Matisse, Pablo Picasso, and other modernist artists that greatly influenced his style. He later wrote "Under the influence of Picasso and Juan Gris I started to exhibit with the cubists at the Indépendant and the little gallery of Clovis Sagot," but "Like other Spanish artists of my generation [...] I have always been torn between abstraction and realism.” The contact with "the Spanish traditions of El Greco, Velázquez and Goya made me abandon cubism, but revolutionary painting and the peculiar discipline of cubism left its imprint on my thinking."

== Career in Spain ==
In 1915, when World War I broke out, Moya del Pino returned to Madrid and became associated with the city's artistic and literary circles, while working professionally as a painter and illustrator. He was the youngest member of the Tertulia de Levante at the Nuevo Café Levante, where he met writers and artists including Pío Baroja, Rubén Darío, José Gutiérrez Solana, Darío de Regoyos, and Ramón del Valle-Inclán (Moya later collaborated extensively with Valle-Inclán). He also participated in the gatherings at the Café de Pombo and appeared in Gómez de la Serna's La sagrada cripta de Pombo (1924), both in the text and in photographs. And Moya was also identified in accounts and photographs of literary banquets attended by figures including Federico García Lorca, Miguel de Unamuno, and José Gutiérrez Solana.

=== Illustration and book arts ===
During the 1910s and 1920s Moya del Pino established himself as a leading book and magazine illustrator. He formed a close professional relationship and friendship with the writer Ramón del Valle-Inclán, illustrating several of his works including the 1916 edition of La Lámpara Maravillosa and the collection of works Opera Omnia. He illustrated numerous books by Francisco Villaespesa, as well as works by Joaquín Dicenta, Ramón Pérez de Ayala, Luis de Góngora, Miguel de Unamuno and others.

He also produced numerous illustrations for the leading Spanish magazines La Esfera, Mundo Gráfico, and Blanco y Negro; and advertising for the Spanish soap company Jabones La Toja and the fragrance company Heno de Pravia.

=== Portraits of Spanish society ===
As his reputation grew, Moya del Pino received commissions to paint portraits of Spanish aristocracy and public figures, including King Alfonso XIII, the Duke of Alba (Jacobo FitzJames Stuart y Falcó, a Spanish noble, diplomat, politician, and art collector), and the American Ambassador to Spain, Alexander Moore. These connections proved crucial to the launch of the Velázquez exhibition project.

=== The Velázquez Project ===
During a trip to London in the mid 1910s, Moya del Pino had conceived an ambitious plan: to create a complete set of faithful copies of the masterworks of Diego Velázquez and tour them across the Americas. In the early 1920s he presented the project to the Duke of Alba, who obtained the King’s enthusiastic support; and the King agreed to finance a “cultural expedition,” with the goal of fostering tourism to Spain by introducing other nations to the country’s artistic masterpieces.

Work on the copies began on November 2, 1921, and Moya del Pino labored for four years on this project: measuring, studying, grinding pigments, and mixing colors according to 17th Century recipes in order to duplicate the original canvases as exactly as possible. He completed 41 copies, including Las Meninas, The Surrender of Breda (Las Lanzas), Los Borrachos (The Drunkards, also known as The Triumph of Baccus), The Spinners (Las Hilanderas), Vulcan’s Forge, and other major works in the Prado Museum.

The copies were remarkably faithful to the originals, and took on added significance during the Spanish Civil War, when bombing threatened Madrid and the Prado’s masterpieces, as they provided a safeguard against the possible destruction of the original works by Velázquez.

Moya's portraits of King Alfonso XIII and the Duke of Alba accompanied the collection. The project was formalized as Exhibiciones Velázquez S.A., a public limited company registered on January 19, 1922. The Duke of Alba served as honorary president; the Spanish Minister of Education, Joaquín Salvatella, and the ambassador of Spain in London, Alfonso Merry del Val, served as vice presidents.

On October 31, 1924, a farewell banquet was held at the Ritz Hotel in Madrid, attended by the cream of Spanish cultural and aristocratic society. Moya del Pino departed from Cádiz on February 18, 1925, aboard the transatlantic steamer Reina María Cristina.

== Career in the United States ==
Moya del Pino moved to San Francisco during the late 1920s and taught at the San Francisco Art Students League (a cooperative space featuring an art gallery, art classes, and art supply store founded by fellow artist Ray Strong), The California School of Fine Arts (now called the San Francisco Art Institute; from 1937 until 1940) and the College of Marin (in the 1950s and early 1960s). He was also involved with the founding of the Marin Art and Garden Center in Ross, California, and served as the first vice president.

In 1929, he married Helen Pauline Horst, daughter of Emil Clemens Horst in San Francisco. After marriage together they lived at 3820 Washington Street in Presidio Heights, San Francisco.

He was known for his portraiture but he also painted murals for post offices around the Bay Area (1936–1941) as well as contributing a mural in the lobby of Coit Tower as part of the Public Works of Art Project in 1934.

In 1933, Moya del Pino painted murals and managed the lavish interior design for the rathskeller (a basement tasting room) at the Aztec Brewing Company in San Diego. In November 1935, Moya del Pino painted three murals in the boardroom at Acme Brewing Company at 762 Fulton Street, San Francisco. The Acme Brewing Company building was demolished in 1990, however the Moya del Pino murals were moved and currently live at the Logan Heights Library in San Diego.

He had stopped painting in 1961, due to a long-term illness.

== Death and legacy ==
Moya del Pino died in Ross, California, on March 7, 1969, and was buried at Mount Olivet Catholic Cemetery in San Rafael, California. He was survived by two daughters and one son, and his wife Helen.

The Marin Art and Garden Center's Octagon House contains the Jose Moya del Pino library.

== See also ==
- List of United States post office murals
