= Caroline Sealy Livermore =

American activist

- Born: Caroline Sealy; August 7, 1883; Galveston, Texas
- Died: February 2, 1968 (aged 84); San Francisco, California
- Occupation: Conservationist
- Known for: California landmarks and parks in early 20th century
- Notable work: Mount Livermore, highest peak on Angel Island named after her

Caroline Sealy Livermore (7 August 1883 – 2 February 1968) was an American conservationist with emphasis in environment planning and protection. Livermore was mostly in the San Francisco Bay Area in both Marin County and the shore areas, during the 20th century. She pursued her conservation efforts over a period of 15 years where she interacted with national and state level lawmakers. Her work led to the protection of Angel Island and its declaration as a state park. Consequently, the highest mountain on the Angel Island was named Mount Livermore in her honor.

Livermore was Chairman of Women's Committees on the Pacific Coast. She was responsible for the creation of the Marin Audubon Society, the Marin Art and Garden Center (in Ross, California), Marin Conservation League, the Richardson Bay Foundation, and the Point Reyes National Seashore Foundation.

== Biography ==
Caroline (née Sealy) Livermore was born on 7 August 1883, in Galveston TX, to George Sealy, a business man, and Magnolia (née Willis) Sealy. She married Norman B Livermore, an engineer cum businessman from a wealthy and well known family. He had his own firm in the 1930s which was later renamed to Norman B. Livermore & Sons in 1938 with his sons as share holders. They moved to the glades of Ross to the north of Mill Valley in 1930 with their five sons: Norman Banks, George Sealy, John Sealy, Horatio Putnam, and Robert. Her husband was also represented on many corporate boards and in the Marin Republican Party central committee. In this county she took to the task of conservation as an "indefatigable warrior for the green cause". They had built up a reputation in the county and her sons were also well established professionally.

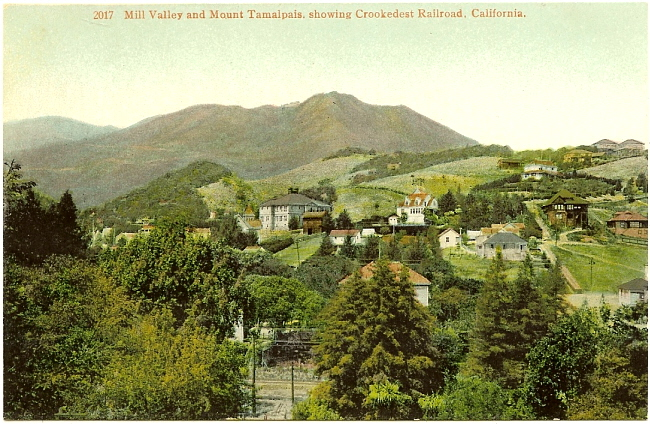
View of Mount Tamalpais.

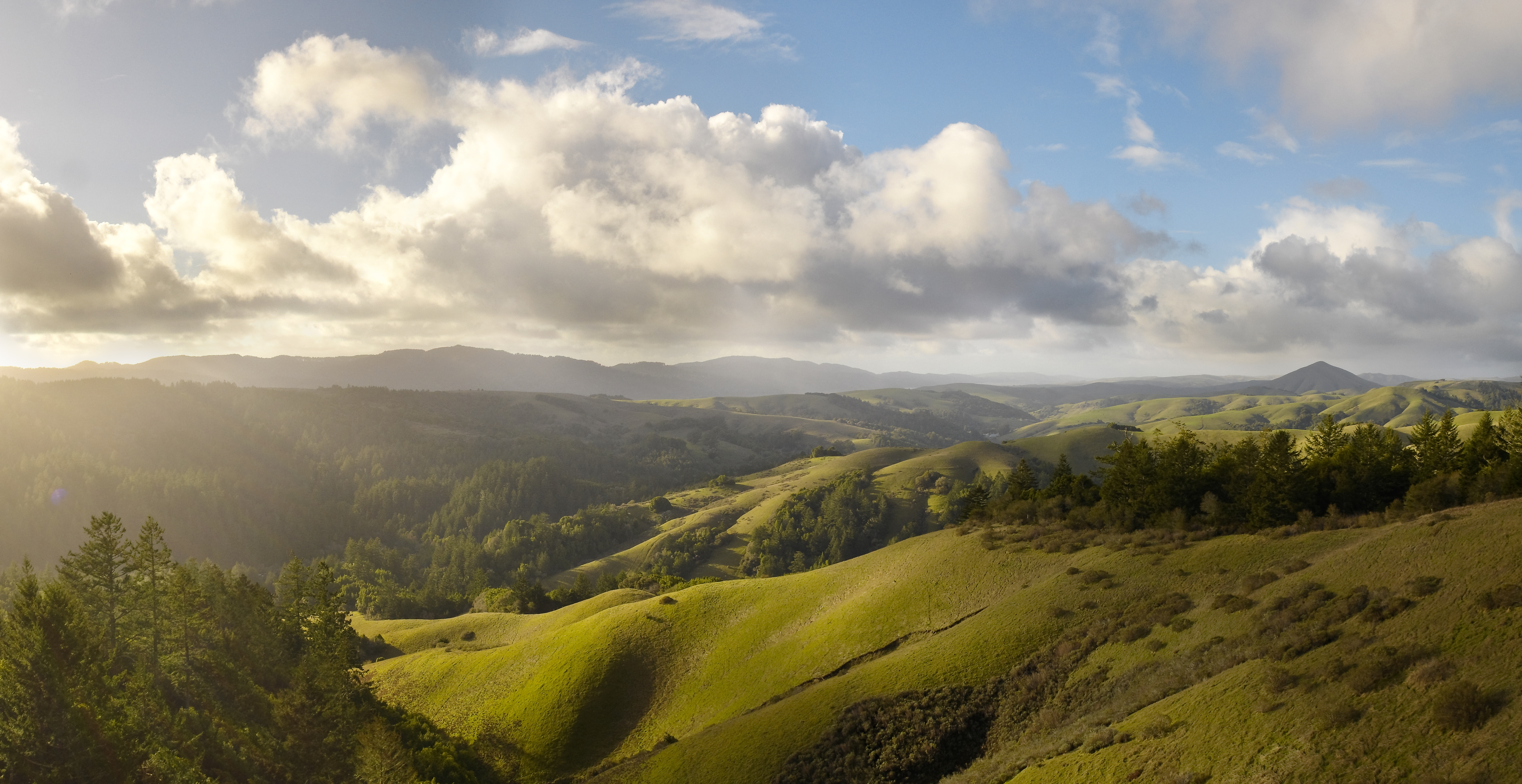
View of Samuel P. Taylor State Park, California.

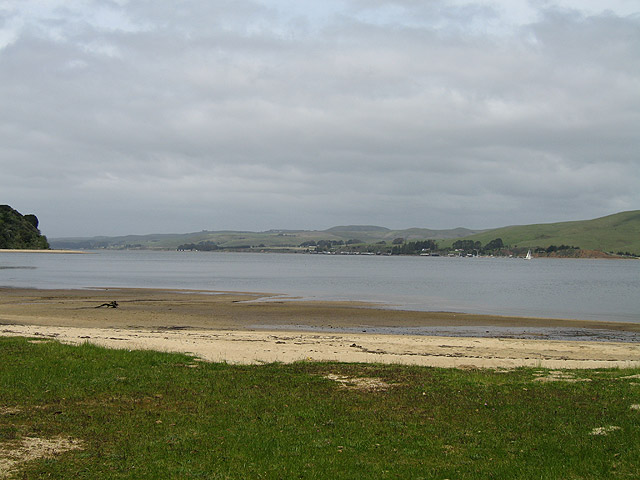
View of Tomales Bay State Park.

In the 1930s, Livermore took up the matter of conservation of Marin County by first pursuing stoppage of the degradation of the slopes of Mount Tamalpais which acted as an important watershed. She established the Marin Conservation League, which she spearheaded for twenty years, with objective to prepare and implement a "green, open-space county master plan" relevant to the post-World War II period in the Bay Area. Through this league she achieved the conservation of Stinson Beach which later became a state beach park. She established Samuel P. Taylor Park and Tomales Bay State Park by ensuring acquisition of lands for their creation. She also led a movement to remove ugly "roadside billboards", which were marring the scenery, by coordinating with supervisors of the county and got an ordinance passed through a state bill, which was the first anti-billboard ordinance. In the Richardson Bay tidal zone her efforts of conservation resulted in relocation and conservation of the Lyford Mansion, now declared a Marin historic site. After reviving the non-functional Angel Island Foundation, in 1955 they purchased the island, which was later declared a California State Park in 1963.

Livermore was also honorary chair of the Point Reyes National Seashore Foundation, and with her efforts the foundation could move the government to pass the park bill in 1962, a legislation for a national seashore.

Caroline Livermore died on 2 Feb 1968, in San Francisco CA.

== Bibliography ==
- Foundation, Protestant Episcopal (1935). Cathedral Age. Protestant Episcopal Cathedral Foundation.
- Walker, Richard (1 October 2009). The country in the city: the greening of the San Francisco Bay Area. University of Washington Press. ISBN 978-0-295-98973-0.
- White, James Terry (1967). The National Cyclopaedia of American Biography: Being the History of the United States as Illustrated in the Lives of the Founders, Builders, and Defenders of the Republic, and of the Men and Women who are Doing the Work and Moulding the Thought of the Present Time. University Microfilms.
