= Kentfield, California =

Community in California, US

- Unincorporated community Census-designated place
- Location in Marin County and the state of California

- Location in the United States
- Coordinates: 37°57′08″N 122°33′26″W
- Country: United States
- State: California
- County: Marin

Government
  - County Board: District 2 Brian Colbert
  - Senate: Mike McGuire (D)
  - Assembly: Damon Connolly (D)
  - U. S. Congress: Jared Huffman (D)

Area
  - Total: 3.046 sq mi (7.89 km^{2})
  - Land: 3.027 sq mi (7.84 km^{2})
  - Water: 0.019 sq mi (0.049 km^{2}) 0.62%
- Elevation: 115 ft (35 m)

Population (2020)
  - Total: 6,808
  - Density: 2,249.1/sq mi (868.4/km^{2})
- Time zone: UTC−8 (PST)
  - Summer (DST): UTC−7 (PDT)
- ZIP codes: 94904, 94914 (PO boxes)
- Area codes: 415/628
- FIPS code: 06-38114
- GNIS feature ID: 1658892

Kentfield (formerly Ross Landing, Tamalpais, and Kent) is an unincorporated community in Marin County, California, United States, just north of San Francisco. Kentfield is located 2 miles (3 km) southwest of downtown San Rafael, at an elevation of 115 feet (35 m). For statistical purposes, the United States Census Bureau has defined Kentfield as a census-designated place (CDP). The CPD also includes the unincorporated part of neighboring Greenbrae. The population was 6,808 at the 2020 census. The ZIP codes are 94904 for street addresses, and 94914 for PO boxes, and are shared with Greenbrae.

== History ==
In 1857, James Ross (1812–1862) bought Rancho Punta de Quentin. Ross, a Scot who had arrived in San Francisco from Australia in 1848 and made his fortune in the wholesale liquor business, set up a trading post called "Ross Landing". Steamers would come up Corte Madera Creek to the landing there. Albert Emmett Kent bought the land from the Ross estate in 1871. Kent built an estate called Tamalpais, later applied to the nearby railroad station. His son, William Kent, was a US Congressman, philanthropist and founder of Muir Woods.

The name of the railroad station was changed to Kent in the 1890s, and finally to Kentfield with the opening of the first post office in 1905.

== Geography ==
Kentfield is located on the eastern slopes of Mount Tamalpais. It is at 37°57′08″N 122°33′26″W. It is bordered to the north by Ross, to the northeast by San Rafael, and to the south by Larkspur.

According to the United States Census Bureau, the CDP has a total area of 3.0 square miles (7.8 km^{2}), of which 0.02 square miles (0.05 km^{2}), or 0.62%, are water.

== Climate ==
The National Weather Service reports that Kentfield's warmest month is July, with an average high of 82.7 °F (28.2 °C) and an average low of 53.0 °F (11.7 °C). December is the coolest month, with an average high of 54.8 °F (12.7 °C) and an average low of 41.3 °F (5.2 °C). The highest temperature on record was 112 °F (44 °C) on July 11, 1913. The lowest temperature recorded was 17 °F (−8 °C) on December 31, 1915. Annually, there are an average of 19.6 days with highs of 90 °F (32 °C) or higher and 1.3 days with highs of 100 °F (37.8 °C) or more. Freezing temperatures (32 °F or 0 °C or below) occur an average of 3.8 days each year.

Kentfield has one of the highest average rainfall totals of any community in the San Francisco Bay Area; normally 47.98 inches (1,219 millimeters) of rain falls each year on an average of 68.9 days. The most rainfall in a month was 26.95 in (685 mm) in February 1986 and the most in 24 hours was 11.56 in (294 mm) on January 21, 1967. Although heavy snow sometimes falls on nearby Mount Tamalpais, snow is rare in Kentfield; however, trace amounts were reported on January 28 and December 13, 1972.

Climate data for Kentfield, California, 1991–2020 normals, extremes 1902–present
Month	Jan	Feb	Mar	Apr	May	Jun	Jul	Aug	Sep	Oct	Nov	Dec	Year
Record high °F (°C)	79 (26)	84 (29)	91 (33)	97 (36)	102 (39)	110 (43)	112 (44)	106 (41)	110 (43)	101 (38)	89 (32)	79 (26)	112 (44)
Mean maximum °F (°C)	66.3 (19.1)	72.0 (22.2)	77.6 (25.3)	85.3 (29.6)	90.3 (32.4)	97.8 (36.6)	97.5 (36.4)	98.0 (36.7)	97.3 (36.3)	90.2 (32.3)	75.8 (24.3)	65.3 (18.5)	102.2 (39.0)
Mean daily maximum °F (°C)	56.6 (13.7)	61.1 (16.2)	65.1 (18.4)	68.7 (20.4)	73.5 (23.1)	79.6 (26.4)	82.5 (28.1)	83.0 (28.3)	82.1 (27.8)	75.8 (24.3)	63.6 (17.6)	56.4 (13.6)	70.7 (21.5)
Daily mean °F (°C)	49.2 (9.6)	52.2 (11.2)	54.8 (12.7)	57.5 (14.2)	61.5 (16.4)	65.8 (18.8)	67.9 (19.9)	68.3 (20.2)	67.4 (19.7)	62.9 (17.2)	54.5 (12.5)	49.1 (9.5)	59.3 (15.2)
Mean daily minimum °F (°C)	41.9 (5.5)	43.2 (6.2)	44.4 (6.9)	46.3 (7.9)	49.5 (9.7)	52.0 (11.1)	53.2 (11.8)	53.6 (12.0)	52.7 (11.5)	50.0 (10.0)	45.4 (7.4)	41.7 (5.4)	47.8 (8.8)
Mean minimum °F (°C)	32.2 (0.1)	33.8 (1.0)	36.1 (2.3)	38.5 (3.6)	43.4 (6.3)	46.5 (8.1)	48.5 (9.2)	48.7 (9.3)	46.6 (8.1)	41.9 (5.5)	35.3 (1.8)	31.7 (−0.2)	29.9 (−1.2)
Record low °F (°C)	18 (−8)	21 (−6)	24 (−4)	29 (−2)	33 (1)	37 (3)	37 (3)	37 (3)	34 (1)	28 (−2)	25 (−4)	17 (−8)	17 (−8)
Average precipitation inches (mm)	8.77 (223)	8.72 (221)	6.00 (152)	2.61 (66)	1.40 (36)	0.36 (9.1)	0.00 (0.00)	0.05 (1.3)	0.09 (2.3)	1.98 (50)	4.63 (118)	9.78 (248)	44.39 (1,128)
Average precipitation days (≥ 0.01 in)	11.5	11.0	10.6	6.2	3.7	1.1	0.2	0.2	0.9	3.7	7.5	11.6	68.2
Source: NOAA

== Demographics ==
Historical population
Census	Pop.	Note	%±
1990	6,030		—
2000	6,351		5.3%
2010	6,485		2.1%
2020	6,808		5.0%
U.S. Decennial Census; 1860–1870 1880-1890; 1900 1910 1920; 1930 1940 1950; 1960 1970 1980; 1990 2000 2010; 2020

Kentfield first appeared as a census designated place in the 1990 U.S. census.

=== Racial and ethnic composition ===
Kentfield CDP, California – Racial and ethnic composition Note: the US Census treats Hispanic/Latino as an ethnic category. This table excludes Latinos from the racial categories and assigns them to a separate category. Hispanics/Latinos may be of any race.
Race / Ethnicity (NH = Non-Hispanic)	Pop 2000	Pop 2010	Pop 2020	% 2000	% 2010	% 2020
White alone (NH)	5,897	5,729	5,530	92.85%	88.34%	81.23%
Black or African American alone (NH)	22	33	33	0.35%	0.51%	0.48%
Native American or Alaska Native alone (NH)	10	6	2	0.16%	0.09%	0.03%
Asian alone (NH)	135	223	313	2.13%	3.44%	4.60%
Native Hawaiian or Pacific Islander alone (NH)	7	7	5	0.11%	0.11%	0.07%
Other race alone (NH)	12	15	46	0.19%	0.23%	0.68%
Mixed race or Multiracial (NH)	127	173	426	2.00%	2.67%	6.26%
Hispanic or Latino (any race)	141	299	453	2.22%	4.61%	6.65%
Total	6,351	6,485	6,808	100.00%	100.00%	100.00%

=== 2020 census ===
As of the 2020 census, Kentfield had a population of 6,808 and a population density of 2,249.1 inhabitants per square mile (868.4/km^{2}). The age distribution was 25.6% under the age of 18, 6.6% aged 18 to 24, 15.5% aged 25 to 44, 30.7% aged 45 to 64, and 21.7% who were 65 years of age or older. The median age was 46.5 years. For every 100 females, there were 92.9 males, and for every 100 females age 18 and over, there were 90.0 males.

The census reported that 6,788 people (99.7% of the population) lived in households, 18 people (0.3%) lived in non-institutionalized group quarters, and 2 people (0.0%) were institutionalized. 98.8% of residents lived in urban areas, while 1.2% lived in rural areas.

There were 2,540 households, of which 36.5% had children under the age of 18 living in them. Of all households, 62.4% were married-couple households, 4.1% were cohabiting couple households, 21.5% had a female householder with no spouse or partner present, and 11.9% had a male householder with no spouse or partner present. 21.2% of households were one person, and 11.8% had someone living alone who was 65 years of age or older. The average household size was 2.67. There were 1,872 families (73.7% of all households).

There were 2,674 housing units at an average density of 883.4 units per square mile (341.1 units/km^{2}), of which 5.0% were vacant and 95.0% were occupied. Of the occupied units, 75.6% were owner-occupied and 24.4% were occupied by renters. The homeowner vacancy rate was 1.3%, and the rental vacancy rate was 5.0%.

=== Demographic estimates ===
In 2023, the US Census Bureau estimated that 13.1% of the population were foreign-born. Of all people aged 5 or older, 85.6% spoke only English at home, 5.6% spoke Spanish, 5.1% spoke other Indo-European languages, 3.0% spoke Asian or Pacific Islander languages, and 0.7% spoke other languages. Of those aged 25 or older, 99.0% were high school graduates and 77.2% had a bachelor's degree.

=== Income and poverty ===
The median household income in 2023 was $231,875, and the per capita income was $136,840. About 1.9% of families and 3.7% of the population were below the poverty line.

=== 2010 census ===
The 2010 United States census reported that Kentfield had a population of 6,485. The population density was 2,132.6 inhabitants per square mile (823.4/km^{2}). The racial makeup of Kentfield was 5,908 (91.1%) White, 35 (0.5%) African American, 10 (0.2%) Native American, 224 (3.5%) Asian, 7 (0.1%) Pacific Islander, 95 (1.5%) from other races, and 206 (3.2%) from two or more races. Hispanic or Latino of any race were 299 persons (4.6%).

The Census reported that 6,463 people (99.7% of the population) lived in households, 13 (0.2%) lived in non-institutionalized group quarters, and 9 (0.1%) were institutionalized.

There were 2,572 households, out of which 893 (34.7%) had children under the age of 18 living in them, 1,562 (60.7%) were opposite-sex married couples living together, 200 (7.8%) had a female householder with no husband present, 78 (3.0%) had a male householder with no wife present. There were 83 (3.2%) unmarried opposite-sex partnerships, and 25 (1.0%) same-sex married couples or partnerships. 600 households (23.3%) were made up of individuals, and 285 (11.1%) had someone living alone who was 65 years of age or older. The average household size was 2.51. There were 1,840 families (71.5% of all households); the average family size was 2.97.

The population was spread out, with 1,660 people (25.6%) under the age of 18, 265 people (4.1%) aged 18 to 24, 1,092 people (16.8%) aged 25 to 44, 2,206 people (34.0%) aged 45 to 64, and 1,262 people (19.5%) who were 65 years of age or older. The median age was 47.0 years. For every 100 females, there were 91.1 males. For every 100 females age 18 and over, there were 86.0 males.

There were 2,758 housing units at an average density of 907.0 per square mile (350.2/km^{2}), of which 1,948 (75.7%) were owner-occupied, and 624 (24.3%) were occupied by renters. The homeowner vacancy rate was 0.8%; the rental vacancy rate was 8.1%. 5,202 people (80.2% of the population) lived in owner-occupied housing units and 1,261 people (19.4%) lived in rental housing units.

== Educational institutions ==
Most of Kentfield is in the Kentfield Elementary School District, while portions are in the Larkspur Elementary School District and the Ross Elementary School District. All of Kentfield is in the Tamalpais Union High School District.

=== Anthony G. Bacich Elementary School ===
A.G. Bacich Elementary School is a California Distinguished School that hosts grades TK-4. During the 2009–2010 school year, Bacich Elementary School served approximately 600 children. The school is racially homogeneous, with 91% white. The next largest ethnicity is Asian, at 5%. As of 2010, there were 41 teachers. As of 2009, Bacich has an Academic Performance Index of 946 out of 1000, putting it in the top ranking in the state of California.

=== Adeline E. Kent Middle School ===
Adeline E. Kent Middle School is a co-ed California Distinguished School and a California Gold Ribbon School that hosts grades 5–8. As of 2014 it enrolled 522 students. The school is racially homogeneous, with over 90% white. The next largest ethnicity is Asian, at 3%. The school consists of 38 classrooms, as well as a multipurpose room, a gym, and a library. As of 2003, there were 32 teachers. As of 2009, Kent has an Academic Performance Index of 944 out of 1000, putting it in the top ranking in the state of California.

=== Marin Catholic High School ===
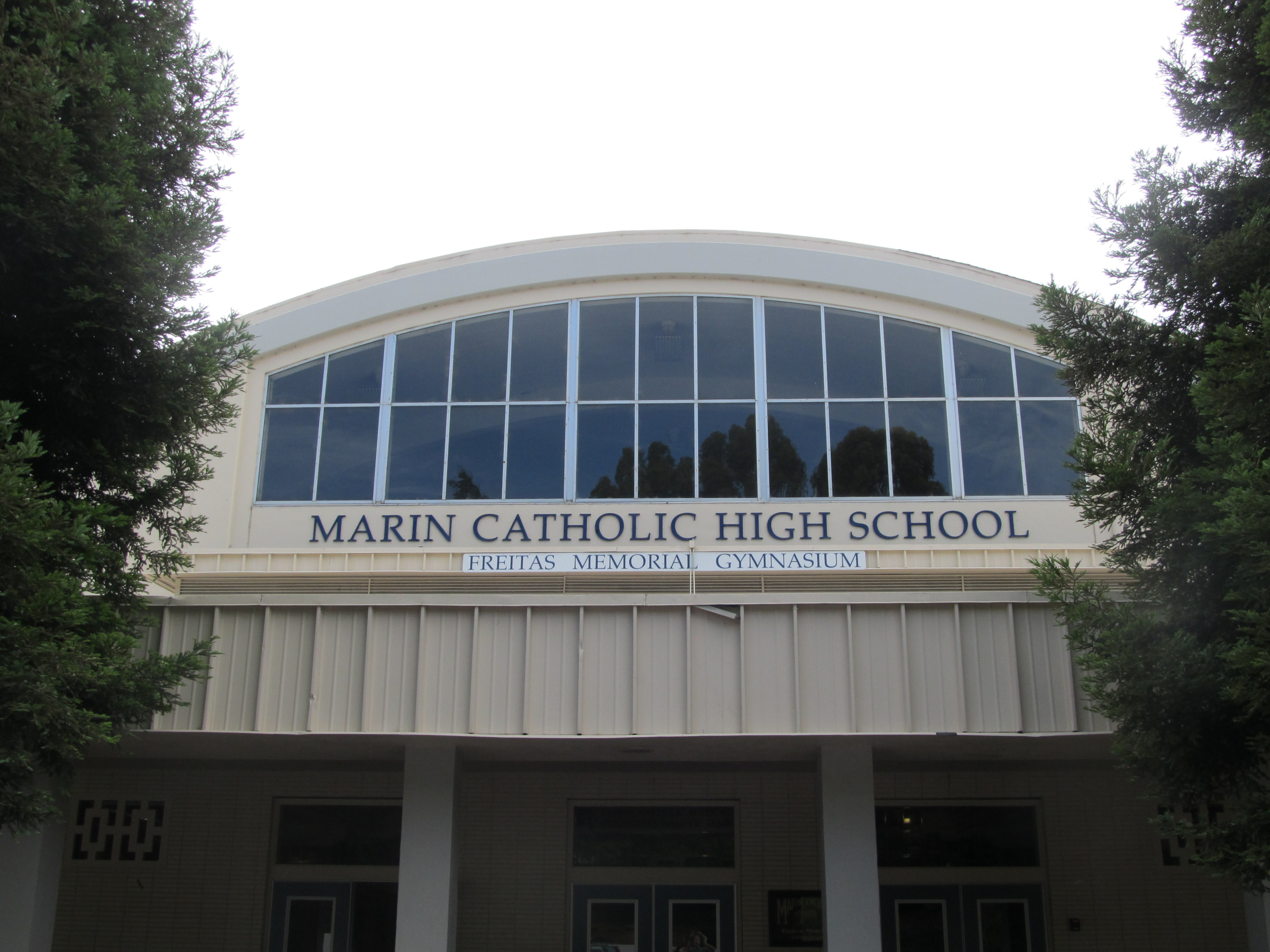
Marin Catholic High School

Marin Catholic High School, a Roman Catholic college preparatory, serves young boys and girls in the Catholic tradition. The student population currently numbers around 800. The school is owned by the Archdiocese of San Francisco.

=== College of Marin ===
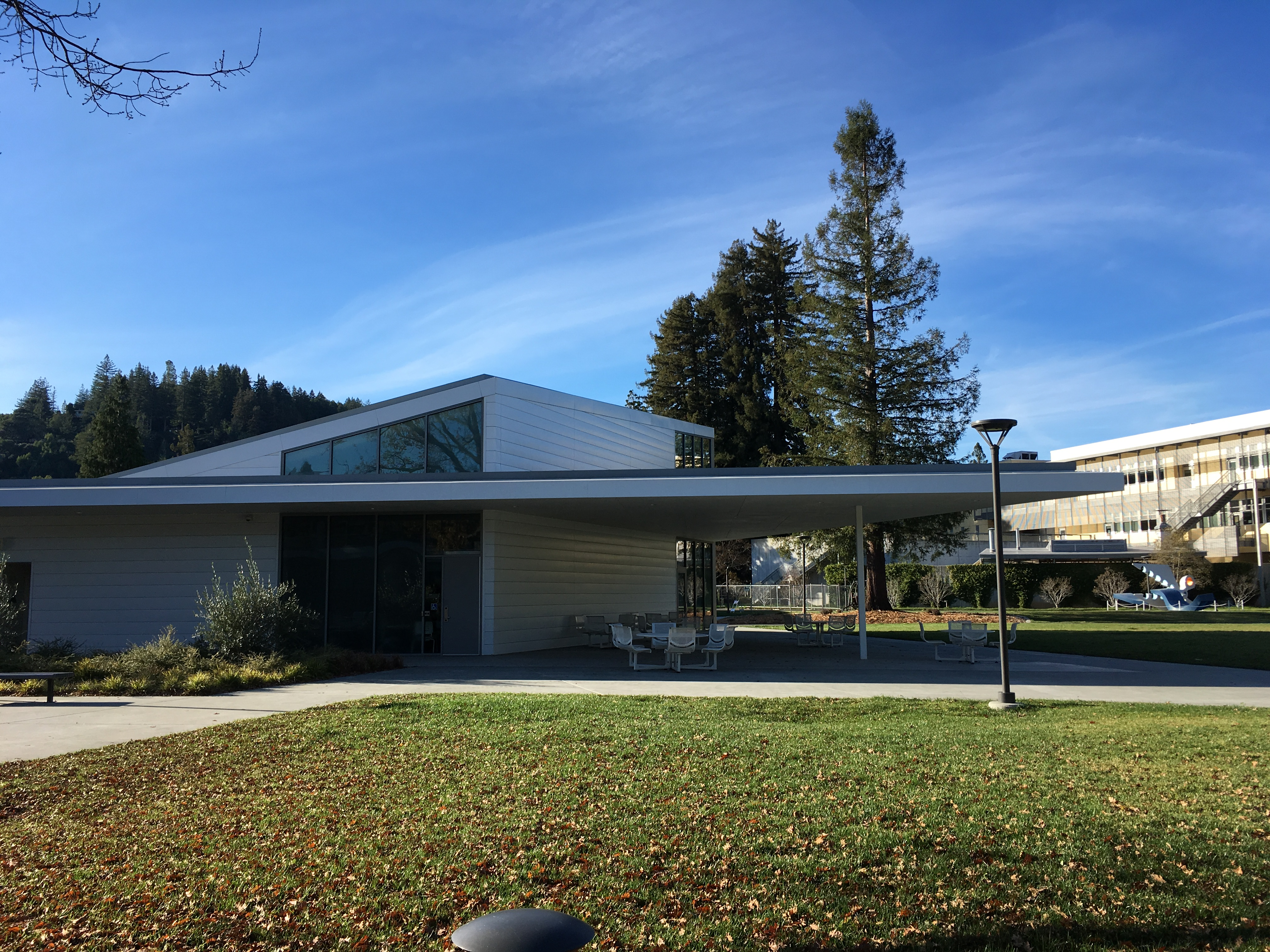
College of Marin

The main campus for the College of Marin is in Kentfield, and is across the street from Kent Middle School. College of Marin is well known for its theatre department, with the highest transfer acceptance to Juilliard of any junior college in the state. In 2026 it finished a major rebuilding of its library and student center.

== Notable people ==
- Frederic Lister Burk, educator and university president, lived many years in Kentfield.
- Jared Goff, NFL quarterback for the Detroit Lions and the Los Angeles Rams, attended Marin Catholic High School.
- Charles S. Kilburn, U.S. Army brigadier general
- Brian McCall, outfielder for Chicago White Sox
- Gavin Newsom, 42nd mayor of San Francisco and 40th governor of California
- Pete Carroll former Seattle Seahawks coach, attended College of Marin
- Robin Williams, actor and comedian, attended College of Marin
