= Emil Clemens Horst =

Agriculturalist in the United States of America (1867–1940)

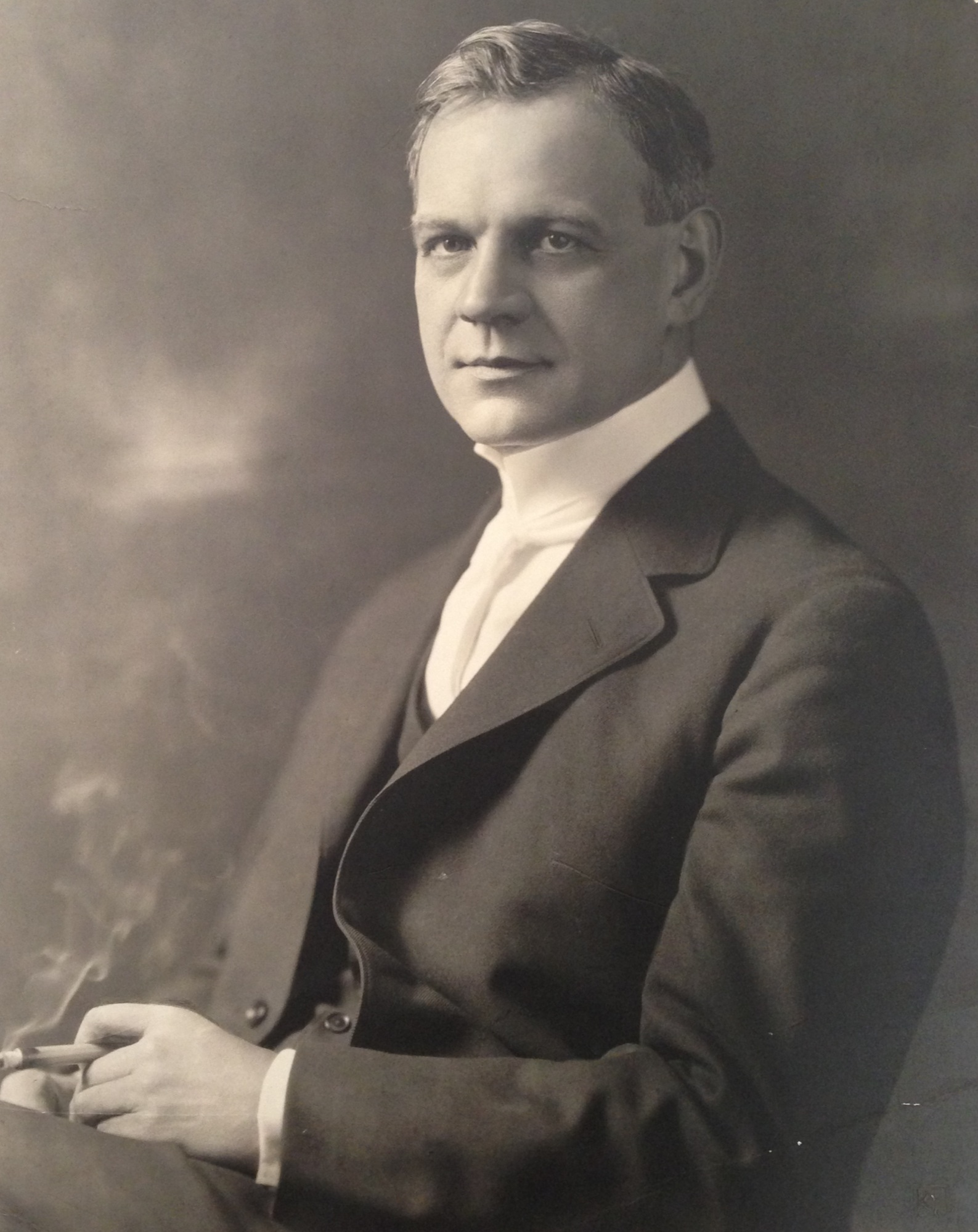
- Horst (1912)
- Born: March 18, 1867; Tuttlingen, Kingdom of Württemberg
- Died: May 24, 1940 (aged 73); San Francisco, California, U.S.
- Burial place: Olivet Memorial Park, Colma, California, U.S.
- Education: City College of New York, Cooper Union
- Spouse: Daisy Brown
- Children: 3
- Relatives: Jose Moya del Pino (son in-law), Edouard Thys (son in-law)

Emil Clemens Horst (18 March 1867 – 24 May 1940) was a major figure in the cultivation, harvest and sale of hops in the United States. The founder of the Horst Company. He invented the mechanical hops separator in 1909 and was the largest hop grower in the world in 1912.

== Early life ==
Horst emigrated to the United States as a child in 1871 from Tuttlingen, Kingdom of Württemberg, German Empire. He studied at City College of New York and Cooper Union.

In the mid 1880s he purchased a small plot of land along the Bear River, near Wheatland, California, and began cultivating hops. He soon bought out two other hop growers, Hugh Roddan and Joseph M.C. Jasper.

In 1893, he married Daisy Brown of Sacramento.

== Horst hops ranch ==
By 1898, Horst's operation had grown to the point that ten hop drying kilns ran daily during the harvest and a company town, large enough to have its own post office, was started on the ranch to support the thousands of migrant workers who picked the mature hops each year. Given the significance of Horst's ranch, certain loamy floodplain soils found in the area were later named after him.

Horst married in 1898, and moved to San Francisco in 1902. By 1904 he was supplying Oregon hops to the Guinness Brewery in Ireland. By 1912, Horst owned the largest number of acres of hops under cultivation in the world with offices in Chicago, New York and London. Horst Company was headquartered at 150 Pine Street, San Francisco, California. Prior to World War II, Horst Company was the only exporter of hops to Germany.

=== Labor conditions ===
In 1886, labor shortages and threats of a strike by white workers had become serious; hop growers founded the California Hop Growers’ Association, and hired Chinese workers. Simultaneously hop labor camp conditions had become "unspeakably bad throughout the state and the pay was equally abysmal" so that by 1899 the Horst Brothers neighboring Durst Ranch's 300 white and a number of Japanese employees quit and went on strike for more pay. To recruit workers Durst launched advertising campaigns not only by making false promises but advertised for at least twice as many workers than they actually needed, with the goal to play one group off against the other, as he admitted before the U.S. Immigration Commission.

=== Mechanization and unrest ===
Horst revolutionized the processing of hops with the invention of his mechanical hop separator, patented 1909 in Elk Grove, California. It picked the hops while discarding the bine and leaves. It produced 25 bales of hops in one day, while an experienced worker picked just two bales in a week, allowing him to bypass the hassles of hiring seasonal labor. Horst continuously invented new hop-related machinery (1884–1924) holding at least 14 patents. In the first season that Horst used the new machine, he advertised and kept hop pickers on hand, in case anything went wrong. When the separator proved itself and the pickers were told that there would be no work, the workers went on strike and blocked access to the kilns, halting the harvest.

The harvesting process was further developed in 1939 (US Patent #2139046) by his son-in-law, Edouard Thys, founder of Thys Company which, among other industrial parts, manufactured the parts for the portable hop picking machine.

Hop production peaked between 1912 and 1916 and plummeted thereafter. On 3 August 1913 the Durst Ranch became the site of the Wheatland Hop Riot. Until 2009, when Google released a digitized version of the 1916 Commission on Industrial Relations, the Horstville ranch was often confused with the neighboring Durst Ranch.

A film produced between 1900 and 1910 entitled Horst Hop Ranch, depicts the processing of hops and their shipment to market.

== Death ==
He died 24 May 1940 in his home at 31 Presidio Terrace in San Francisco, and was buried at Olivet Memorial Park in Colma, California. He was survived by his wife Daisy (née Brown) and their 3 children.
