= Horstville, California =

Former settlement in California, United States

Horstville
- Ghost town
- Location in California Horstville (the United States)
- Coordinates: 39°01′41″N 121°23′30″W
- Country: United States
- State: California
- County: Yuba
- Elevation: 112 ft (34 m)

Horstville is a former settlement in Yuba County, California, United States. It was located 2 miles (3.2 km) northeast of Wheatland, at an elevation of 112 feet (34 m).

A post office operated at Horstville from 1898 to 1901. The name is in honor of E. Clemens Horst, local rancher. Horstville was a company town for Horst's farms, where hops were grown and dried; Horstville had a dining hall, store, and worker housing. During Prohibition, when there was no market for hops, Horstville built a fruit cannery which was still standing as of 2009, though little else remains of the town.

== See also ==
Wheatland Hops Riot
