= Rancho Punta de Quentín =

Mexican land grant in California

Coordinates: 37.960°N 122.560°W

Rancho Punta de Quentín was a 8,877-acre (35.92 km^{2}) Mexican land grant in present-day Marin County, California, given in 1840 by Governor Juan B. Alvarado to John B.R. Cooper. The grant comprised not only the San Quentín Peninsula, but also present-day Ross, Kentfield and part of San Anselmo.

== History ==
Captain John Bautista Rogers Cooper (1791–1872) married General Vallejo’s sister Encarnacion in 1827 and became a naturalized Mexican in 1830. In 1840, Governor Alvarado granted Cooper the two square league Rancho Punta de Quentín. His Marin holdings also included Rancho Nicasio, which he and Pablo de la Guerra were granted in 1844. Cooper established a lumber business, which he contracted others to run. In 1847, he leased a section of the point to the U.S. government for a sawmill. He sold his interests in both Marin County ranches to Benjamin Rush Buckelew in 1850.

Benjamin Rush Buckelew (1822–1859) and his wife, Martha, came to California in 1846 with the Hoppe and Harlan wagon train. In San Francisco, he founded a watchmaking and jewelry shop, and manufactured gold scales for use by miners. He owned and operated the San Francisco newspaper The Californian (1847–48). In 1850, Buckelew bought three Marin County ranches in 11 days. Besides Cooper's Rancho Punta de Quentín, Buckelew also purchased Cooper's Rancho Nicasio and John Reed's Rancho Corte Madera del Presidio. In 1852, the California Legislature bought twenty acres at the tip of the rancho, where the Board of Prison Commissioners planned to build a state prison.

With the cession of California to the United States following the Mexican-American War, the 1848 Treaty of Guadalupe Hidalgo provided that the land grants would be honored. As required by the Land Act of 1851, a claim for Rancho Punta de Quentín was filed with the Public Land Commission in 1853, and the grant was patented to Benjamin R. Buckelew in 1866.

Due to illness, bad luck, and poor judgment, Buckelew became embroiled in a series of costly lawsuits, resulting in the loss of all three ranchos. Buckelew fought with John Cowell and James Ross over the ranchos until his death in 1859.

In 1857, James Ross (1812–1862), in partnership with John and Henry Cowell, bought Rancho Punta de Quentín from Buckelew. Ross, a Scot who had arrived in San Francisco from Australia in 1848 and made his fortune in the wholesale liquor business, moved his family into the Buckelew home and set up a trading post called "Ross Landing". In 1870, James Ross' widow, Annie Ross, was forced to sell large parcels of land.

== See also ==
- Ranchos of California
- List of Ranchos of California
