= Ross, California =

City in Marin County, California

Town of Ross
- Town in California
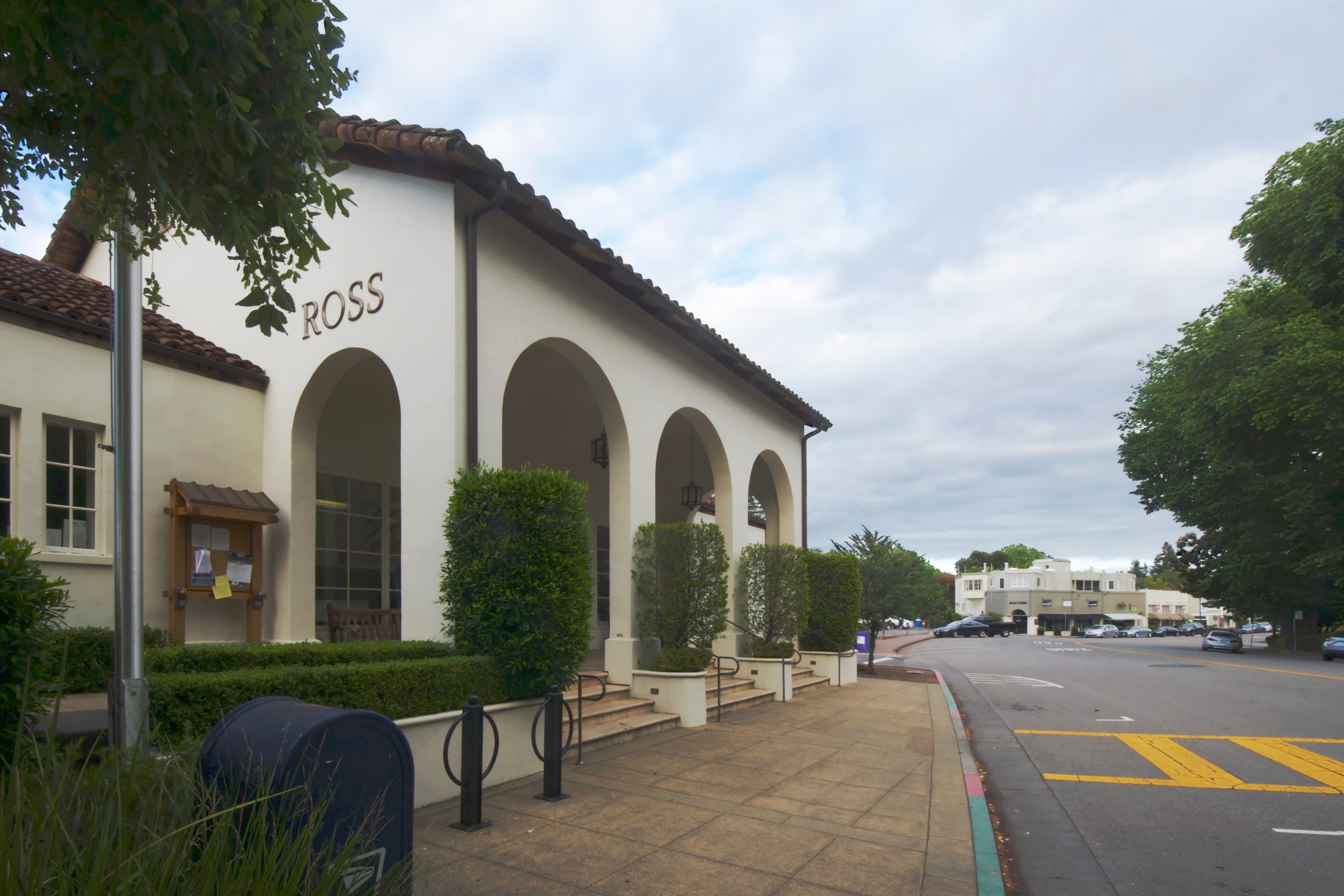
- Post office on Ross Common

- Interactive map of Town of Ross
- Location in the United States
- Coordinates: 37°57′45″N 122°33′18″W
- Country: United States
- State: California
- County: Marin
- Incorporated: August 21, 1908

Government
  - Mayor: Julie McMillan
  - Mayor Pro Tem: Elizabeth Robbins
  - Town Manager: Christa Johnson
  - State Leg.: Sen. Mike McGuire (D); Asm. Damon Connolly (D)
  - U. S. Congress: Jared Huffman (D)
  - County Board: District 2 Brian Colbert

Area
  - Total: 1.56 sq mi (4.0 km^{2})
  - Land: 1.56 sq mi (4.0 km^{2})
  - Water: 0.00 sq mi (0 km^{2}) 0%
- Elevation: 36 ft (11 m)

Population (2020)
  - Total: 2,338
  - Estimate (2024): 2,297
  - Density: 1,500.6/sq mi (579.4/km^{2})
- Time zone: UTC−8 (PST)
  - Summer (DST): UTC−7 (PDT)
- ZIP Code: 94957
- Area codes: 415/628
- FIPS code: 06-62980
- GNIS feature ID: 0277587
- Website: www.townofrossca.gov

Ross is a small incorporated town in Marin County, California, United States, just north of San Francisco. Ross is located 1.5 miles (2.4 km) west-southwest of San Rafael, at an elevation of 36 feet (11 m). The population was 2,338 at the 2020 census. The town is bordered by San Rafael to the east, Larkspur to the southeast, Kentfield to the south, San Anselmo to the north, and the Mount Tamalpais protected watershed to the west. Ross is named in honor of James Ross, who acquired Rancho Punta de Quentin in 1859.

== History ==
After the Mexican Revolution of 1821, the "land grant" system of parceling out land gave rise to what is now known as Marin County. Ross was originally part of an 8,877-acre (3,592 ha) Mexican land grant to Juan B.R. Cooper in 1840 known as Ranch Punta de Quentin Canada de San Anselmo.

In 1857, James Ross (1812–1862) bought Rancho Punta de Quentin for $50,000. Ross, a Scot who had arrived in San Francisco from Australia in 1848 and made his fortune in the wholesale liquor business, set up a trading post called "Ross Landing". He built his home on Redwood Drive and moved there with his wife and three children. When James Ross died in 1862, his wife, Annie Ross, was forced to sell a portion of her husband's larger land holdings to pay each of their daughters $10,000. The remaining 297 acres (120 ha) comprises the present-day Town of Ross.

The first post office opened in 1887, and Ross incorporated in 1908.

== Geography ==
According to the United States Census Bureau, the town has a total area of 1.6 square miles (4.1 km^{2}), all land.

== Demographics ==
Historical population
Census	Pop.	Note	%±
1880	252		—
1910	556		—
1920	727		30.8%
1930	1,355		86.4%
1940	1,751		29.2%
1950	2,179		24.4%
1960	2,551		17.1%
1970	2,742		7.5%
1980	2,801		2.2%
1990	2,123		−24.2%
2000	2,329		9.7%
2010	2,415		3.7%
2020	2,338		−3.2%
2024 (est.)	2,297	▼	−1.8%
U.S. Decennial Census; 1860–1870 1880-1890; 1900 1910 1920; 1930 1940 1950; 1960 1970 1980; 1990 2000 2010; 2020

=== 2020 census ===
As of the 2020 census, Ross had a population of 2,338 and a population density of 1,500.6 inhabitants per square mile (579.4/km^{2}).

The age distribution was 28.7% under the age of 18, 6.3% aged 18 to 24, 13.6% aged 25 to 44, 29.1% aged 45 to 64, and 22.2% who were 65 years of age or older. The median age was 45.8 years. For every 100 females, there were 94.0 males, and for every 100 females age 18 and over there were 89.6 males age 18 and over.

Racial composition as of the 2020 census
Race	Number	Percent
White	2,082	89.1%
Black or African American	2	0.1%
American Indian and Alaska Native	1	0.0%
Asian	41	1.8%
Native Hawaiian and Other Pacific Islander	0	0.0%
Some other race	30	1.3%
Two or more races	182	7.8%
Hispanic or Latino (of any race)	130	5.6%

The census reported that 97.8% of the population lived in households, 2.2% lived in non-institutionalized group quarters, and no one was institutionalized. 97.5% of residents lived in urban areas, while 2.5% lived in rural areas.

There were 799 households, out of which 43.6% had children under the age of 18 living in them. 70.0% were married-couple households, 2.3% were cohabiting couple households, 18.3% had a female householder with no spouse or partner present, and 9.5% had a male householder with no spouse or partner present. 15.9% of households were one person, and 10.3% were one person aged 65 or older. The average household size was 2.86. There were 649 families (81.2% of all households).

There were 880 housing units at an average density of 564.8 units per square mile (218.1 units/km^{2}), of which 799 (90.8%) were occupied. Of occupied housing units, 87.9% were owner-occupied and 12.1% were occupied by renters. The homeowner vacancy rate was 1.1% and the rental vacancy rate was 13.4%.

=== Income and poverty ===
In 2023, the US Census Bureau estimated that the median household income was more than $250,000, and the per capita income was $148,198. About 0.0% of families and 4.1% of the population were below the poverty line.

=== 2010 census ===
At the 2010 census Ross had a population of 2,415. The population density was 1,551.8 inhabitants per square mile (599.2/km^{2}). The racial makeup of Ross was 2,265 (93.8%) White, 6 (0.2%) African American, 2 (0.1%) Native American, 45 (1.9%) Asian, 3 (0.1%) Pacific Islander, 19 (0.8%) from other races, and 75 (3.1%) from two or more races. Hispanic or Latino of any race were 94 people (3.9%).

The census reported that 2,363 people (97.8% of the population) lived in households, 52 (2.2%) lived in non-institutionalized group quarters, and no one was institutionalized.

There were 798 households, 357 (44.7%) had children under the age of 18 living in them, 575 (72.1%) were opposite-sex married couples living together, 55 (6.9%) had a female householder with no husband present, 28 (3.5%) had a male householder with no wife present. There were 13 (1.6%) unmarried opposite-sex partnerships, and 7 (0.9%) same-sex married couples or partnerships. 120 households (15.0%) were one person and 60 (7.5%) had someone living alone who was 65 or older. The average household size was 2.96. There were 658 families (82.5% of households); the average family size was 3.26.

The age distribution was 731 people (30.3%) under the age of 18, 108 people (4.5%) aged 18 to 24, 362 people (15.0%) aged 25 to 44, 801 people (33.2%) aged 45 to 64, and 413 people (17.1%) who were 65 or older. The median age was 45.1 years. For every 100 females, there were 92.0 males. For every 100 females age 18 and over, there were 89.0 males.

There were 884 housing units at an average density of 568.0 per square mile, of the occupied units 686 (86.0%) were owner-occupied and 112 (14.0%) were rented. The homeowner vacancy rate was 1.0%; the rental vacancy rate was 5.7%. 2,078 people (86.0% of the population) lived in owner-occupied housing units and 285 people (11.8%) lived in rental housing units.

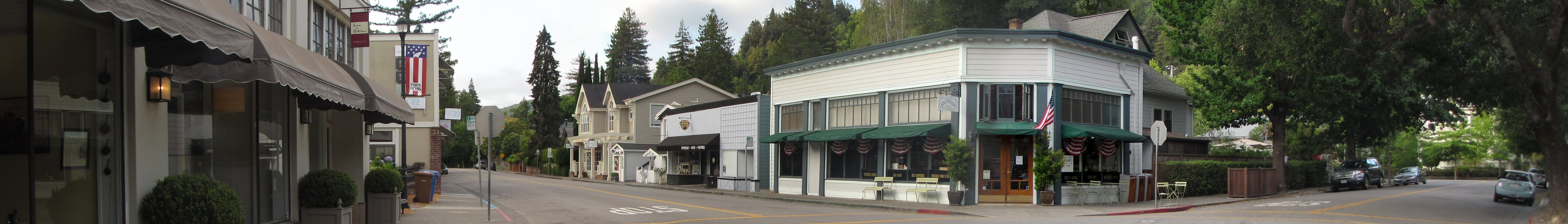
Ross Common

== Arts and culture ==
Landmarks include the Ross Bear sculpture by Beniamino Bufano located near town hall, and the Marin Art and Garden Center. The town doubled for New Hampshire in the 1972 film The Godfather when a scene was shot using the Ross School.

== Government ==
According to the California Secretary of State, as of February 10, 2019, Ross has 1,606 registered voters. Of those, 685 (42.7%) are registered Democrats, 380 (23.7%) are registered Republicans, and 472 (29.4%) have declined to state a political party.

== Education ==
Ross is in the Ross Elementary School District and the Tamalpais Union High School District.

Institutions include:

- The Branson School
- Ross School

== Notable people ==
- Signy Coleman, actress
- Gavin Newsom, politician
- Dylan Penn, model and daughter of actors Sean Penn and Robin Wright
- Maria Pitillo, actress
- Jack Woolams, test pilot
- Isabella Worn, garden designer
- Alan Sues, actor, comedian
