= Tomales Bay State Park =

State park in California, United States

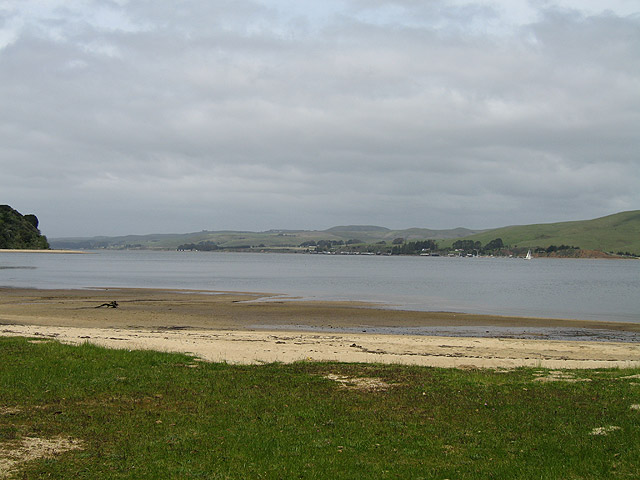
- Tomales Bay from Heart's Desire Beach, Tomales Bay State Park

- Location within California Location within the United States
- Location: Marin County, California, United States
- Nearest city: Inverness, California
- Coordinates: 38°7′22″N 122°53′22″W
- Area: 2,000 acres (810 ha)
- Established: 1952
- Governing body: California Department of Parks and Recreation

Tomales Bay State Park is a California state park in Marin County, California. It consists of approximately 2,000 acres (8 km²) divided between two areas, one on the west side of Tomales Bay and the other on the east side. The main area, on the west, is part of the Point Reyes peninsula, and adjacent to Point Reyes National Seashore, which is operated by the U.S. National Park Service. The park is approximately 40 miles (64 km) north of San Francisco.

== History ==
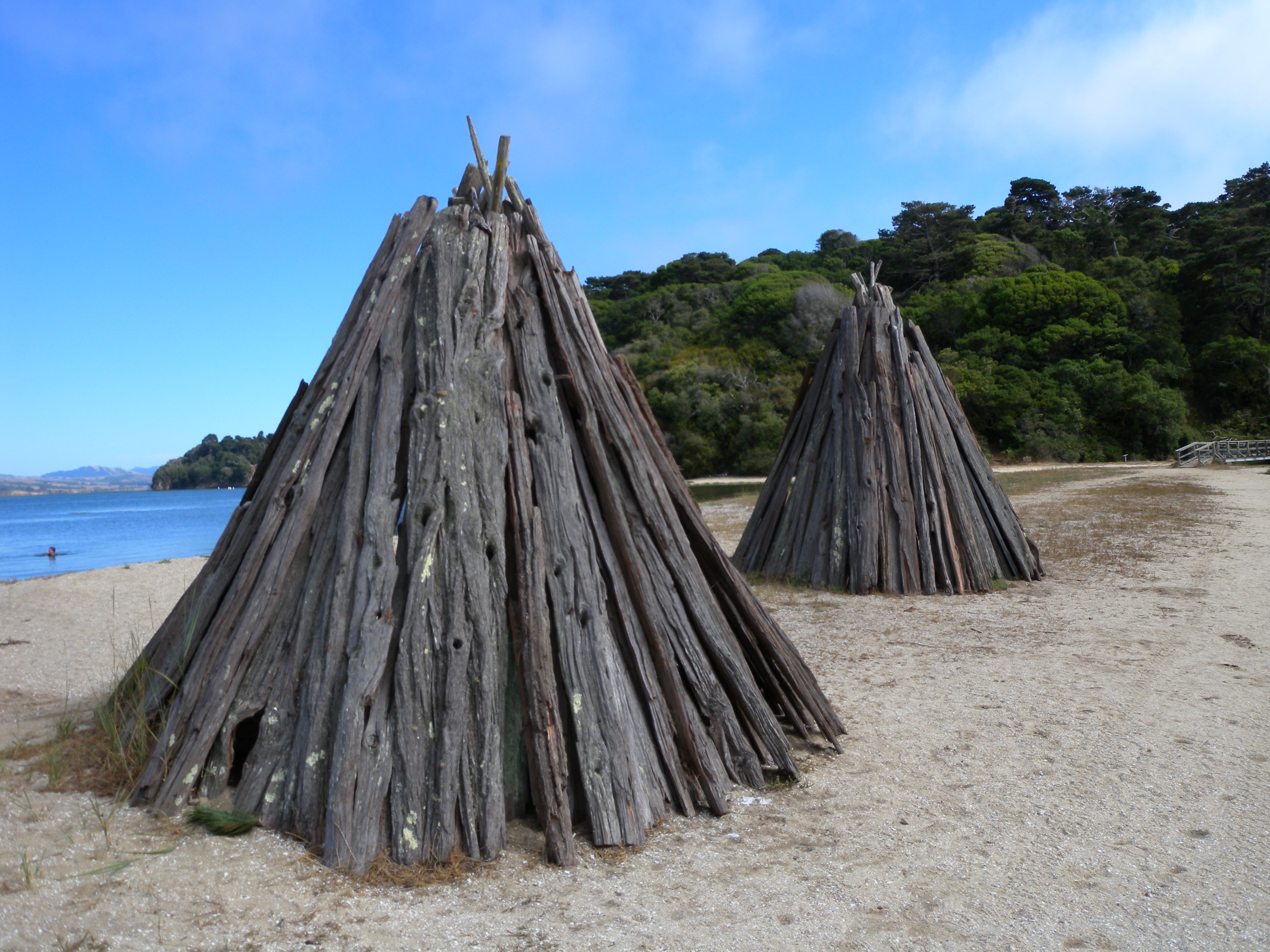
Reconstructed Miwok bark houses in Tomales Bay State Park

The area was the habitat of the Coast Miwok people for several thousand years before the arrival of Europeans. British explorer Sir Francis Drake landed in the area in 1579. About 25 years later, Spanish explorer Sebastián Vizcaíno landed in the area and named it "La Punta de Los Tres Reyes" ("Point of the Three Kings"), a reference to the Feast of the Three Kings. The name was later anglicized to Point Reyes.

Most of Point Reyes remained undeveloped because of its remote location; the main part of the peninsula hosts a number of agricultural uses, particularly dairy operations. Some of the beach areas on Tomales Bay began to be purchased by private parties, and in order to secure public access to the Bay, conservation groups and the state of California also purchased property, and the state park was opened on November 8, 1952. When most of the rest of Point Reyes was incorporated into Point Reyes National Seashore, Tomales Bay State Park remained in the state park system.

== Facilities ==
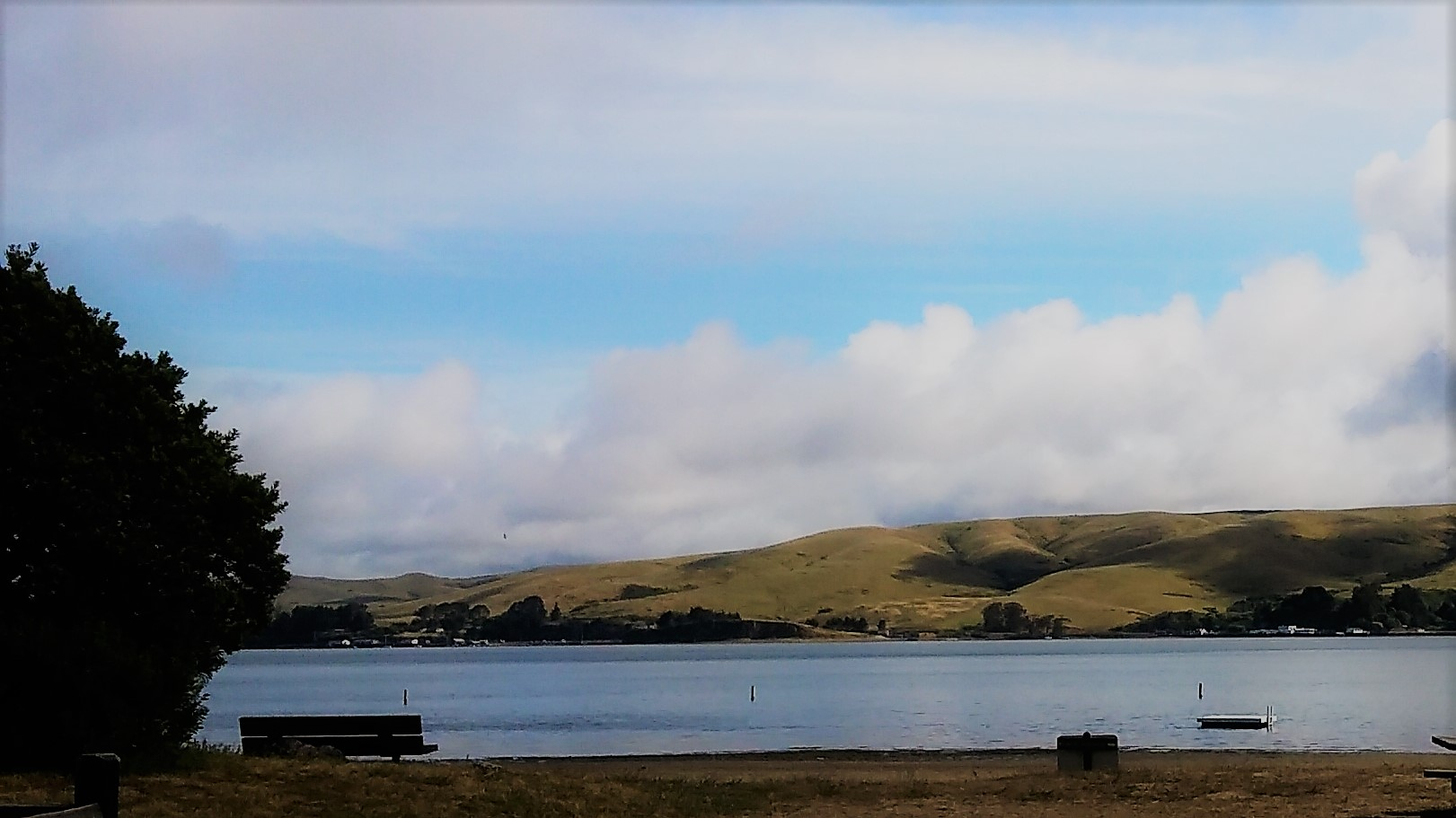
Heart's Desire Beach Swimming Area

The west area of the park contains four beach areas: Indian Beach, Heart's Desire Beach, Pebble Beach, and Shell Beach. Only Heart's Desire is reachable by road, and has two parking areas, picnic grounds, and rest rooms. There is a swimming area with a moored platform at Heart's Desire. The other beaches are accessible only by trail or boat. The east area of the park is mostly unimproved, and the only facilities are a picnic area and rest rooms at Millerton Point.

Indian Beach has an interpretive program on the Miwok people, including two reconstructed Miwok dwellings.

== Proposed for closure ==
Tomales Bay State Park was one of 48 California state parks proposed for closure in January 2008 by California's Governor Arnold Schwarzenegger as part of a deficit reduction program.

== See also ==
- List of beaches in California
- List of California state parks
